= William Bryson (civil engineer) =

British civil engineer and architect

William Edward Bryson
- Born: 1823; Edinburgh, Scotland
- Died: 24 June 1903 (aged 79); Melbourne, Australia
- Citizenship: British
- Education: Academy of Design in Dublin
- Engineering career
- Discipline: engineer
- Institutions: Institution of Civil Engineers
- Projects: Malmsbury Viaduct, Taradale Viaduct

William Edward Bryson (1823 – 24 June 1903) was a British civil engineer, surveyor and architect who was involved in major railway projects in Ireland, Scotland, the United States, and Australia. He was born in Edinburgh on 1823, educated at the Academy of Design in Dublin, and worked initially in Ireland in the construction of the Dublin and Mullingar Railway, and then in Scotland, on the Dumfries and Glasgow Railway.

== Railway work ==
Bryson worked on the Midland and Great Western railway lines in Ireland under G. W. Hemans, who was engineer-in-chief. These lines included substantial bridges on the River Shannon, River Suck and an arm of the sea, where Bryson may have gained experience in large bridge designs. He served as resident engineer in 28 miles of the line, which was completed in 1850. With the decline of railway work in Britain, Bryson emigrated to the USA in 1847, where he was involved in the construction of the Hudson River Railway and the LaSalle Street Tunnel in Chicago.

Bryson then journeyed to Australia and commenced work with the newly-formed Victorian Railways Department on the Melbourne to Bendigo railway line. He was responsible for designing most of the large structures on the line including bridges and viaducts under the supervision of George Christian Darbyshire. Captain Andrew Clarke, R. E., Surveyor-General of Victoria was the overall design engineer for the line. Bryson stated to the Select Committee of the Legislative Assembly on Railway Contracts that he had designed most of the large bridges on the line. Clarke clearly influenced the design of the railway in setting the standards for the line. However, this was also a very costly undertaking, which stretched the colonial finances and this approach was later abandoned for more economic light lines in later Australian Railways.

Bryson was described as a Civil and Mechanical Engineer in 1857 when he became a member of the Philosophical Institute of Victoria. He was also a member of the Royal Society of Victoria 1859–60 and employed at the "Government Railway Office". He published "Resources of Victoria & their development" in 1860 in the Royal Society’s Transactions.

== Work after the railways ==
Bryson was surveyor and engineer for the shires of Boroondara, Goulburn, Nunawading and Oakleigh, and took an interest in defence matters, writing to the papers advising of possible protection measures and holding the position of Acting Lieutenant of the Collingwood Company of Volunteer Rifles. In his retirement, he lived in Toorak Road Camberwell and spent some if his time inventing. He obtained a patent (No 5,436 1859) for "Socketted insulator supports" on 3 November 1894.

Bryson died on 24 June 1903 at 27 Melville-street, Hawthorn, aged 80 years.

== Major works ==
- Sunbury Viaduct
- Malmsbury Viaduct
- Taradale Viaduct
- LaSalle Street Tunnel
- Saltwater River Rail Bridge over the Maribyrnong River (stone abutments)
