= Saltwater River Rail Bridge =

Railway bridge over the Maribyrnong River, Melbourne, Victoria, Australia

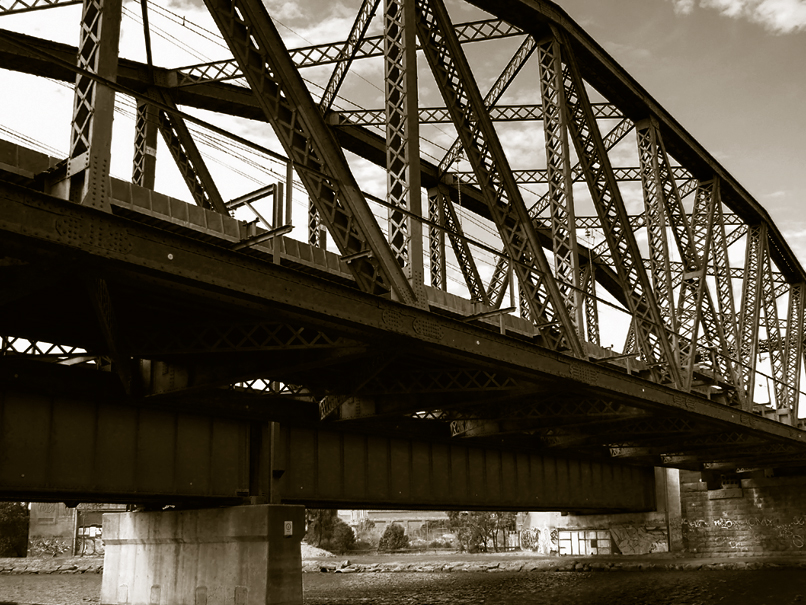
- The railway bridge in 2006
- Coordinates: 37°47′54″S 144°54′59″E
- Carries: Bendigo line
- Crosses: Maribyrnong River; Maribyrnong River Trail
- Locale: Melbourne, Victoria, Australia
- Begins: West Melbourne (east)
- Ends: Footscray (west)
- Other name: Kensington Railway Bridge
- Named for: Former name of the river
- Owner: VicTrack

Characteristics
- Design: Box girder truss bridge
- Material: Wrought iron; bluestone
- Total length: 67 m (220 ft)
- Longest span: 61 m (200 ft)
- No. of spans: 1

Rail characteristics
- No. of tracks: 2

History
- Designer: William Bryson
- Engineering design by: George Christian Darbyshire
- Constructed by: George Holmes & Company (girders); Pierce & Dalziel (abutments)
- Fabrication by: William Fairbairn
- Built: 1856–1858
- Construction end: 1858; 168 years ago
- Construction cost: A£80,000
- Opened: 13 January 1859
- Rebuilt: 1911–1914

Victorian Heritage Register
- Official name: Rail Bridge (over the Maribyrnong River)
- Type: Registered place
- Designated: 24 October 1996
- Reference no.: H1213
- Heritage overlay no.: HO51
- Category: Transport - Rail

Register of the National Estate
- Official name: The Mount Alexander - Murray Valley Railway Line (part)
- Type: Defunct register
- Designated: undated
- Reference no.: 15668

Location
- Interactive map of Saltwater River Rail Bridge

The Saltwater River Rail Bridge, also known as the Kensington Railway Bridge, is a large wrought iron box girder truss railway bridge that carries the Bendigo line over the Maribyrnong River and the adjacent trail, located between West Melbourne and Footscray, in inner-western Melbourne, in Victoria, Australia. Completed in 1858 with a single span of 67 metres (220 ft), it was the longest span of any bridge in Victoria until 1889.

Significantly repaired in 1814, a new two-span steel plate girder bridge opened in 1976, adjacent to and upstream of the original bridge, to carry the commuter rail Sunbury line; and another girder bridge completed adjacent to and downstream, was completed in 2012.

The original bridge was added to the Victorian Heritage Register on 24 October 1996 in recognition of its historic and scientific importance; and was included on a wider listing of the Mount Alexander - Murray Valley Railway Line on the now defunct Register of the National Estate on an unknown date.

== Description ==
Construction of the Bendigo and Williamstown railways by the Melbourne, Mount Alexander and Murray River Railway Company commenced under a private joint stock company in 1854. However, difficulties in raising finance led to its takeover by the Victorian Colonial government in 1856, and the establishment of the Department of Railways to build and operate the main line railways. The chief engineer of the line's construction, George Christian Darbyshire, reported in November 1856, that drawings and specifications for the wrought iron bridge over the Saltwater River (Note: The earlier name for the Maribyrnong River; also sometimes recorded as the "Salt Water River".) had been sent to England on 25 June 1856, and that the drawings and specifications for the masonry of the bridge were also well advanced.

The bluestone abutments were designed by William Bryson.

The specification for the wrought iron tubular box girder bridge to a design developed and fabricated by William Fairbairn & Sons of Manchester were: " ...one span of two hundred feet in the clear between the piers, and to consist of three wrought iron tubular girders, each of two hundred feet clear span, supported upon two stone piers twenty-one feet six inches above high water level. Each girder is to have eight feet bearing each end upon the piers, making the total length of each girder two hundred and sixteen feet. The girders are to be placed parallel to each other, and fifteen feet nine inches apart. The roadway is to be carried upon longitudinal sleepers resting upon, and bolted to the angleirons of the cross bearers. The cross bearers are to be of wrought iron, in one length, reaching from outside to outside girder, and riveted to the bottoms of the outside girders, and riveted and bolted also to the centre girder."

The bridge was completed in December 1858 at a cost of c.A£80,000, and load-tested on 7 January 1859 with two (steam) engines each hauling six wagons loaded with iron rail chairs. The bridge was officially opened by the Governor of Victoria on 13 January 1859.

=== Replacement spans ===
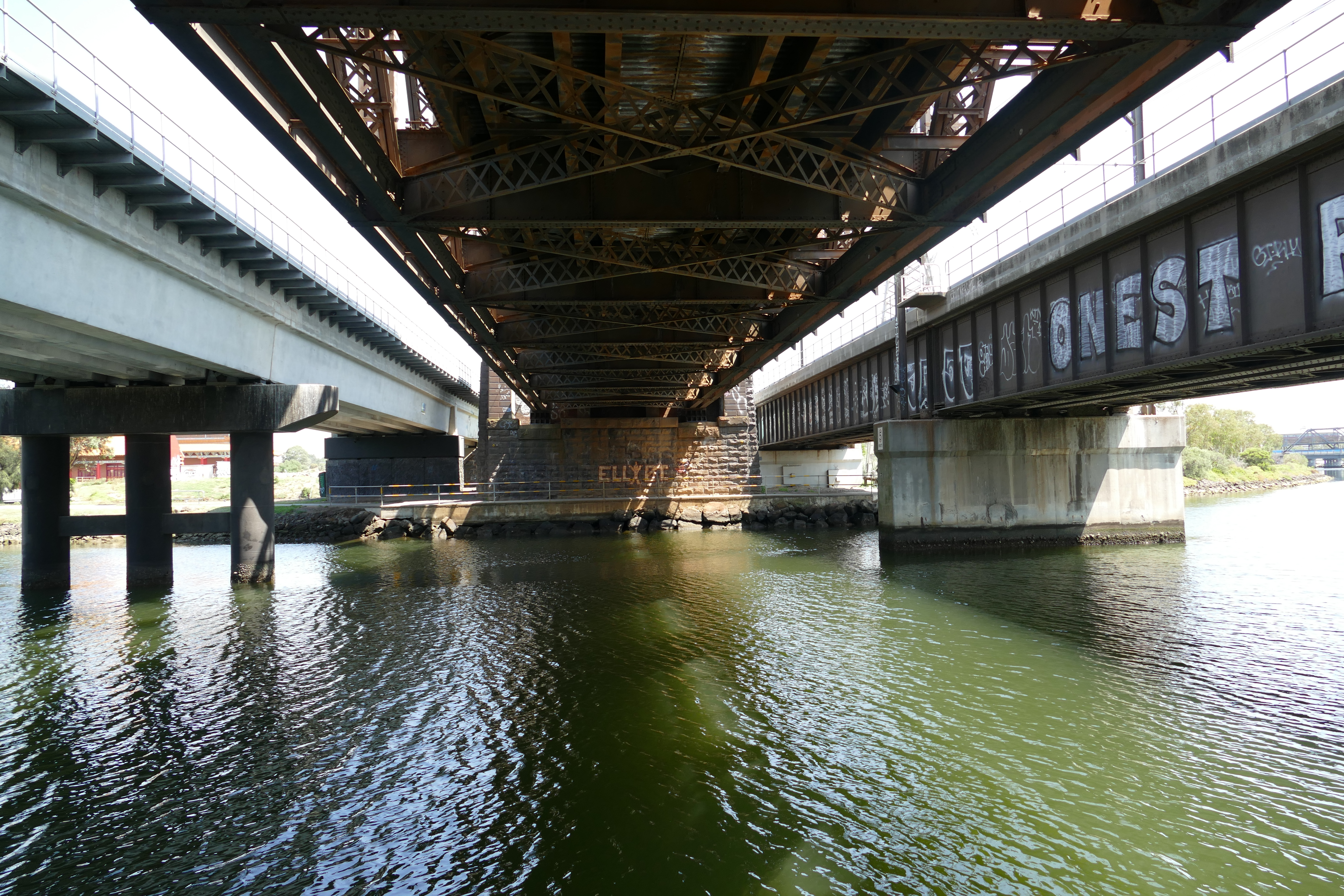
The underside of the bridge in 2020, middle, with the 2012 bridge at left and the 1976 bridge at right

In 1911, in order to carry the heavier locomotives coming into service, and following the installation of temporary timber props to strengthen the bridge, the spans were replaced with two mild steel through hog-back Pratt trusses, fabricated by Mephan Ferguson. So that trains could continue to operate over the bridge during the works, the replacement was done by erecting the new trusses inside the existing girders and then removing the latter. The new structure was completed on 31 October 1914.

== Adjacent bridges ==
A new steel plate two-span girder bridge, with concrete abutments and a mid stream pylon, was erected on the upstream side in 1974 and opened in 1976 to carry the tracks of the commuter rail Sunbury line, and another two-span bridge was erected downstream for the Regional Fast Rail project in 2012.

== See also ==
- List of bridges in Melbourne
- List of railway bridges in Victoria
- List of places on the Victorian Heritage Register in the City of Maribyrnong
