= Cable cars in Chicago =

Mass transit

Chicago City Railway
Overview
- Locale: South of downtown
- Dates of operation: 1882–1906
- Successor: Chicago Surface Lines

Technical
- Track gauge: 4 ft 8 1/2 in (1,435 mm) standard gauge
- Length: 17 1/2 miles (28.2 km)

North Chicago Street Railway
Overview
- Locale: North of downtown
- Dates of operation: 1886–1906
- Successor: Chicago Union Traction

Technical
- Track gauge: 4 ft 8 1/2 in (1,435 mm) standard gauge
- Length: 8 1/2 miles (13.7 km)

West Chicago Street Railroad
Overview
- Locale: West of downtown
- Dates of operation: 1890–1906
- Predecessor: Chicago West Division Ry. Chicago Passenger Ry.
- Successor: Chicago Union Traction

Technical
- Track gauge: 4 ft 8 1/2 in (1,435 mm) standard gauge
- Length: 15 mi (24.1 km)

In 1900, Chicago already had the second largest cable car network in the United States and would eventually surpass New York City to have the largest streetcar network in the world in a few decades. In 1900, there were three private companies operating 41 miles (66.0 km) of double track routes radiating out from Chicago's downtown area. State of the art technology when the first line opened in 1882, by 1900 electric traction had proven superior and in 1906 all cable routes were changed to electrical power. Decades later, most were part of Chicago Transit Authority bus routes.

== History ==
In the 1850s Chicago was growing rapidly and local transportation was a problem. Flat and low, drainage was poor and the roads were often muddy and near impassible for foot and horse traffic.

In 1859 the Illinois state legislature incorporated the Chicago City Railway (CCR) and the North Chicago Street Railroad (NCSR), to provide rail horsecar service in Chicago. In 1861 the Chicago West Division Railway was incorporated. The three companies served different parts of the city, defined by the Chicago River, and were not in competition with each other. By 1880 all three had main routes with feeder lines.

In 1882 the CCR opened cable lines to the south on State St. and Wabash-Cottage Grove Ave. Immediately successful, the State St. line would be extended to 63rd St. by 1887 and the Cottage Grove Ave. line to 71st St. by 1890.

A strike of cable car gripmen occurred in June 1883 to protest the low wages they were offered. The strike halted traffic on all but the State Street line.

In 1886 the NCSR put a cable line on Clark St. and parallel 5th Ave. (now Wells St.) into service. In 1889 a branch on Lincoln Ave. opened, and the last branch, on Clybourn Ave., opened in 1891.

Another strike was called in October 1888, this time stopping all cable car traffic in the city. Replacement workers were brought in from other systems to operate the lines.

In 1890 the re-organized West Chicago Street Railroad (WCSR) opened their first lines, to the northwest on Milwaukee Ave. Shortly afterwards a line straight west on Madison Ave. opened. In 1893 two more routes would open, southwest on Blue Island Ave and south on Halsted St.

In 1892 the Chicago City Council allowed the CCR to electrify three horse lines outside of downtown, two years later many North and West lines were electrified. In 1896 the first downtown electrification was permitted, in 1906 all cable service was converted to electric traction.

== Operations ==
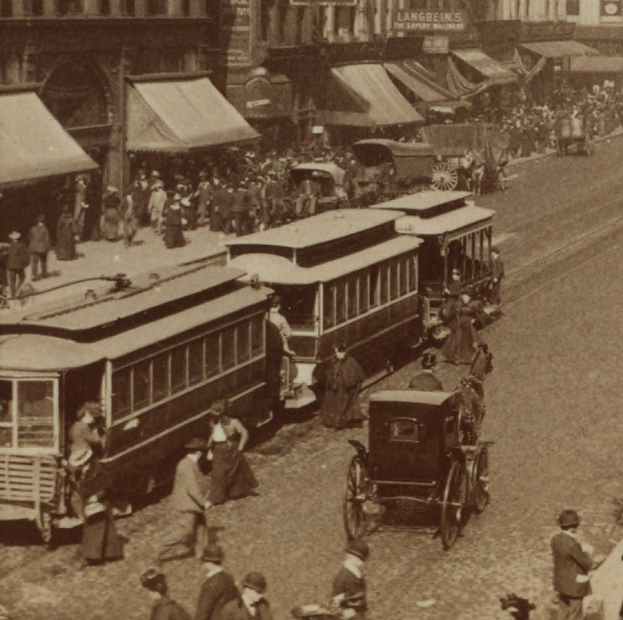
CCR train northbound on State St. (Grip and trailer pulling electric car)

The cable cars did not suffer much from the elements, and the harsher winters of the US Midwest and East Coast were no problem for them. As with some other cities using cable cars the problem in generally flat Chicago was not one of grades, but of traffic volume due to the density of the city.

As in other cities the cable cars did not completely replace the horsecars, but they rather created a transportation backbone. In fact, even as the horse lines were being converted to trolleys, the electrical cars had to be pulled by grip cars through the downtown, due to the lack of trolley wires there.

=== Accidents and incidents ===
Although they were the current state of the art in public transportation, Chicago's cable car operators had their share of accidents and incidents, and were implicated as the cause of death of more than one prominent citizen of the time, including U.S. Senator Francis B. Stockbridge. In another instance, Cleveland Mayor Tom L. Johnson narrowly avoided serious injury when the automobile he was driving was hit by a cable car; Johnson had been in Chicago specifically to see the cable car system and evaluate its potential for use in Cleveland.

One of the more widely reported accidents occurred on December 12, 1894, when a Milwaukee Avenue line car's grip failed upon entering the incline to the Washington Street Tunnel. The crew attempted to apply the brakes, but the car was so full of passengers that it could not be stopped, and it crashed into a West Madison Street line car that was already in the tunnel. Two people were killed in the collision, but many others were evacuated shortly before the stove fires on the two cars ignited the cars themselves.

== Rolling stock ==
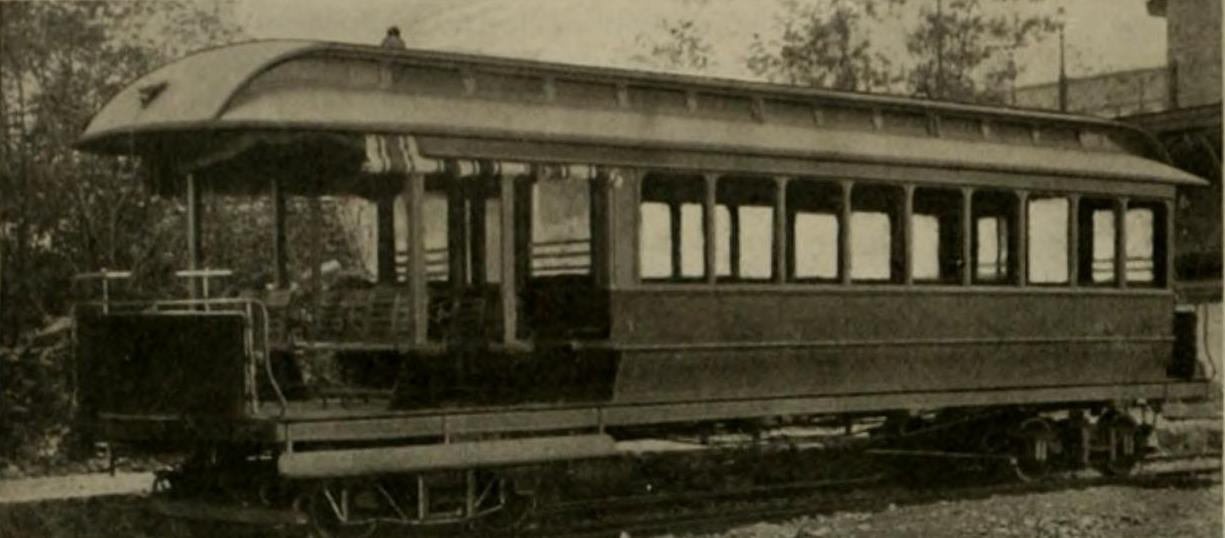
Combination grip car

The passenger numbers caused a different approach than many other cities. Some single cars were used, but on most lines grip cars pulled trains of up to three trailers (reduced to two by law in the 1890s).

Most grip cars were short and open. Four different types of grips were used, one by each company and the WCSR's south and southwest lines using a fourth. CCR used a grip that could grip either side of the cable, allowing the grip car to operate in either direction. NCSR and WCSR grip cars could operate in one direction only. None of the grips could be used on other lines. Approximately 700 grip cars were in service.

Both the NCSR and WCSR operated large combination grip cars, with an open front and closed back sections. These cars also could pull trailers.

Trailers started as short two axle cars similar to horsecars, and were built by the operator. Later, longer two truck cars would be built by vendors. Open summer and closed winter cars were used, with two car trains the norm, there were between two and four trailers for each grip.

== Loops ==
Switching directions on a cable train can be very difficult. Each track can go in one direction only, and the grip car has to be at the head of the train. Turning around a loop was common, at the end of most lines there were loops. In the downtown area the loops went around several blocks, increasing the area the line would otherwise serve. Equipment and operating differences prevented common track use between most routes, in 1900 there were six separate loops in use.

== Tunnels ==
The Chicago River separates the downtown from the North and West sides. Heavy river traffic required moveable bridges, and long delays. Cable cannot be used on moveable bridges, and the delays would have stopped the whole system, so the NCCR leased and refurbished the city's LaSalle St. tunnel under the river, the WCCR would use the similar Washington St. tunnel for its first two lines. For the WCCR's two Southwest lines the company dug a tunnel next to Van Buren St. at their own expense.

== Powerhouses and cables ==
All three companies used similar infrastructures, with large steam boilers and reciprocating engines driving long endless cables through conduits. At their peak there were 13 powerhouses driving 34 cables. Different cables could run at different speeds, the CCR's loop originally ran at 4 mph (6.4 km/h) (increased to 8 1/2 in 1892) while outlying cables could operate at 14 mph (23 km/h).

== Political corruption ==
Throughout cable operations both politics and business were very corrupt in many cities, including Chicago. Some politicians expected not only political support but also bribes. Dummy companies were created to extort the operators, and property owners often conspired to sell their consent to the routes. The CCR, well managed and first in operation, was affected least, while the North and West companies, controlled by robber baron Charles Tyson Yerkes, were involved in some unscrupulous business practices.

== The end of cable service ==
In 1900 the lowering of the river exposed the tops of all three tunnels, making them hazards to navigation. In 1906 all three tunnels under the river were closed for construction, cutting cable service to the North and West. This was when the changeover to electricity ordered by the Chicago City Council in 1905 occurred. The last cable powered train was on the CCR Cottage Grove Ave. line on October 21, 1906.

== The companies ==
=== Chicago City Railway ===
In 1900 the Chicago City Railway was the largest cable operator in the country. Incorporated on February 14, 1859, it was well managed and progressive from its beginning. In 1880 their president had inspected the successful San Francisco lines, and felt cable could be used in Chicago. In 1882 they opened the first cable lines outside of San Francisco. They then built lines past the built up areas, making land along the route more valuable. Development followed the lines, making more traffic.

When first opened the State St. and Wabash - Cottage Grove Avenue lines both used a slow speed (4 mph (6.4 km/h)) three block loop. This could not handle the traffic, in 1892 the Cottage Grove Avenue line started using a new two block loop directly east of the original, which was rebuilt two years later. Trains of both lines ran opposite each other on Wabash Ave.

Because CCR grip cars were bi-directional, trains could be reversed onto the opposite track, and did not need a loop. It also meant that a train could stop and return without going to the end of the line. The Cottage Grove line had runs reversing at 39th St. and at the end of the line.

In 1887 the CCR carried 70,000 to 100,000 passengers a day on approximately 150 trains. By 1892, after both lines had been lengthened, 300 trains were scheduled daily. Three powerhouses pulled thirteen cables.

In 1906 CCR electrified its State St. line on July 22, and the Wabash-Cottage Grove Ave. line on October 21, the last day of cable service in Chicago.

On February 1, 1914, the CCR began operating as part of the Chicago Surface Lines (CSL).

=== North Chicago Street Railroad ===
The North Chicago Street Railroad was the smallest of the three companies. Incorporated in 1859 as the North Chicago Street Railway, a horse-car system, it was badly damaged by the Great Chicago Fire of 1871. Little improvement was done until 1885, when a Philadelphia syndicate controlled by Charles Tyson Yerkes reorganized it as the North Chicago Street Railroad. In 1886 it began converting to cable.

All the NCSR's lines entered downtown through the LaSalle St. tunnel and used a six block loop. The Clybourn Ave. line was the only place where single combination cars were used. The end of that route at had a turntable, rather than the loops that the other lines used.

The NCSR had up to 177 grip cars and many more trailers. Three powerhouses pulled 9 cables.

On May 24, 1899, the NCSR and WCSR were combined into the Chicago Union Traction Co., which would go into receivership on April 22, 1903 and was bought by the Chicago Railway Co. (CR) on January 25, 1908. On February 1, 1914, the Chicago Railway Co. began operating as part of the Chicago Surface Lines.

=== West Chicago Street Railroad ===
The West Chicago Street Railroad was incorporated in 1861 as the Chicago West Division Railway, in 1885 the Chicago Passenger Railway opened as a competitor. In 1887 the two were combined and reorganized by Charles Tyson Yerkes as the West Chicago Street Railroad. This put the NCSR. and WCSR under the same ownership, it began cable service in 1890, the last of the three companies to do so.

A northwest and west line used another tunnel under the river on Washington St. to get to a two block loop, a four block loop was later added. A south and southwest line terminated west of the river until the privately built Van Buren St. tunnel opened in 1894, an eight block loop was used. The northwest Milwaukee Ave. line used single combination cars, all other lines used short grip cars with trailers.

The WCSR had 230 grip cars and several times many trailers. Six powerhouses pulled 12 cables.

On May 24, 1899 the WCSR, like the NCSR, was combined into the CUT, which would be bought by the CR on January 25, 1908. On February 1, 1914, the CR began operating as part of the Chicago Surface Lines.

== Remnants ==
A CCR station from 1893 at 5529 South Lake Park Avenue survives in 2015. It currently serves as the home of the Hyde Park Historical Society. A shop building from 1902 and streetcar barns from 1906 remained in service in 2014 at the Chicago Transit Authority's 77th St. and Vincennes Ave. yard.

A NCSR powerhouse at LaSalle and Illinois Streets remained in 2012.

A WCSR altered powerhouse at Jefferson and Washington Streets and a car barn on Blue Island Ave. near Western Avenue remained in 2016.
