= Taradale Viaduct =

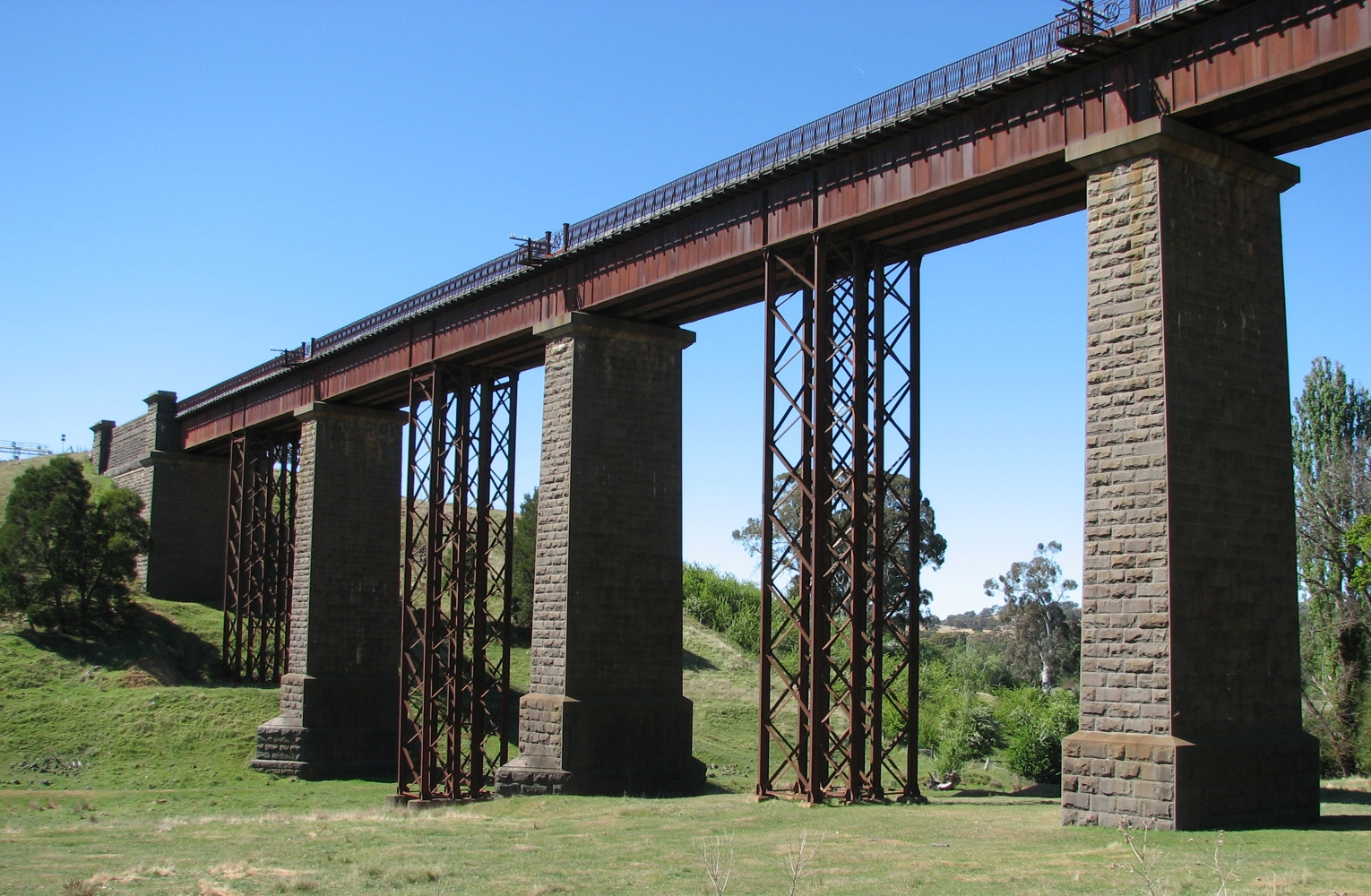
- Taradale Viaduct
- Coordinates: 37°08′29″S 144°21′25″E
- Carries: Bendigo railway line
- Crosses: Back Creek
- Locale: Taradale, Victoria, Australia
- Owner: VicTrack

Characteristics
- Total length: 271 m (889 ft)
- Height: 33 m (108 ft)

History
- Constructed by: Victorian Railways Construction Branch
- Fabrication by: Rowland Brotherhood
- Construction start: 1858
- Construction end: 1862

Location
- Interactive map of Taradale Viaduct

The Taradale Viaduct is a large wrought iron box girder bridge over Back Creek at Taradale, Victoria on the Bendigo Railway in Victoria Australia. It was erected as part of the Melbourne, Mount Alexander and Murray River Railway between 1858 and 1861, and was at the time one of the largest rail bridges built in Australia.

Construction of the Bendigo line commenced under the Melbourne, Mount Alexander and Murray River Railway Company in 1858, but this private consortium met with financial difficulties when it was unable to raise sufficient funds, and was bought out by the Victorian colonial government in 1860 when it formed the Victorian Railways Department. The design work was then taken over by Captain Andrew Clarke, R. E., Surveyor-General of Victoria, with the bridge designs completed by Bryson and O'Hara The ironwork for the bridge was made by Rowland Brotherhood, of Chippenham, Wiltshire, under the supervision of British Railway engineer Isambard Kingdom Brunel. The foundation stone was laid by Mr. W. S. Urquhart Wednesday 25 September 1861

The contract for the first stage of the line from Footscray to Sandhurst (now Bendigo), was let to Cornish and Bruce for £3,356,937.2s.2d ($6.714 million) with work commencing on 1 June 1858. Completion of the permanent way was to be by 31 July 1861.

Clarke appointed William O’Hara to design bridges and viaducts, while William Edward Bryson stated to the Select Committee of the Legislative Assembly on Railway Contracts that he had designed most of the large bridges on the line. Clarke clearly influenced the design of the railway in setting the standards for the line. However, this was also a very costly undertaking, which stretched the colonial finances and this approach was later abandoned for more economic light lines in later Australian Railways. William Edward Bryson was described as a Civil Engineer in 1857 when he was a member of the Philosophical Institute of Victoria. He was also a member of the Royal Society of Victoria 1859-60 and employed at the "Government Railway Office". He published "Resources of Victoria & their development" in 1860 in the Royal Society’s Transactions.

Introduction of heavier locomotives in the 20th century required strengthening of the bridge with steel trestles added between the original masonry piers in 1933-1934.

The bridge is included on the Victorian Heritage Register (VHR Number: H1595). and the National Trust Register.
