= Malmsbury =

- Town
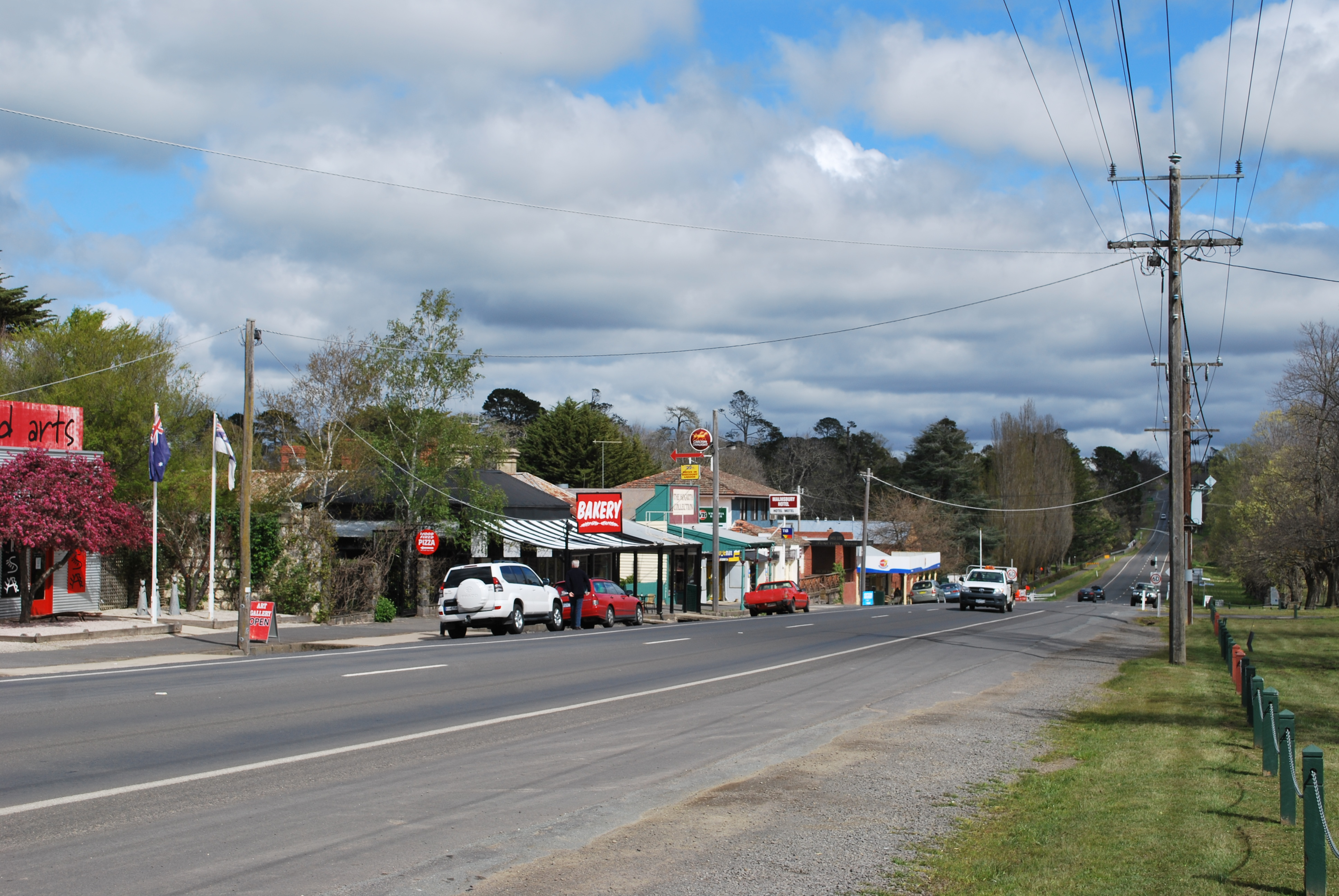
- The Calder Highway at Malmsbury

- Interactive map of Malmsbury
- Coordinates: 37°11′20″S 144°23′6″E
- Country: Australia
- State: Victoria
- LGA: Shire of Macedon Ranges
- Location: 95 km (59 mi) from Melbourne; 54 km (34 mi) from Bendigo; 11 km (6.8 mi) from Kyneton

Government
  - State electorate: Macedon
  - Federal division: Bendigo
- Elevation: 462 m (1,516 ft)

Population
  - Total: 1,101 (2021)
- Postcode: 3446
Localities around Malmsbury
Taradale	Elphinstone	Metcalfe
Drummond North	Malmsbury	Kyneton
Drummond	Lauriston	Kyneton

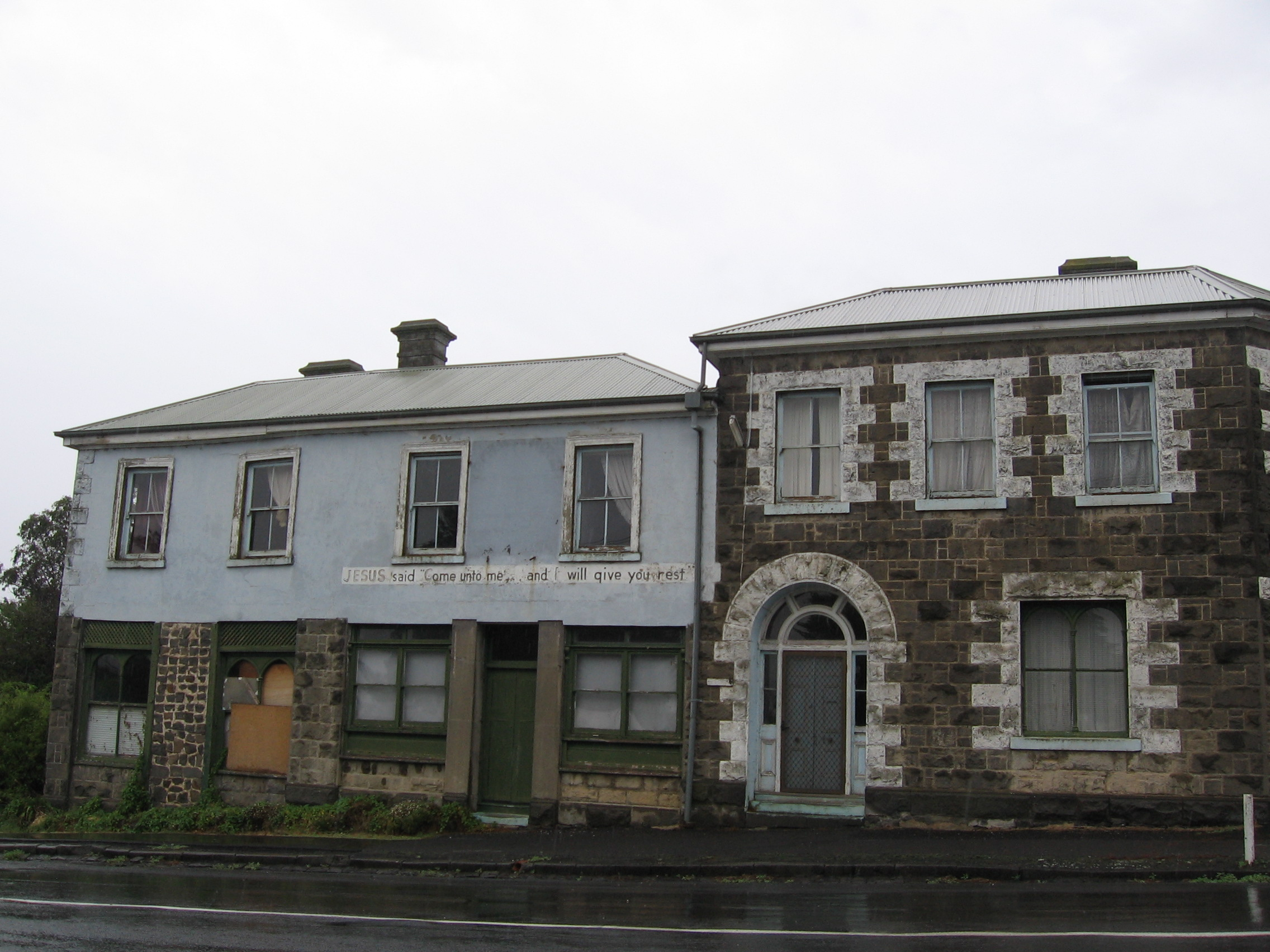
The Mansions, a bluestone building in Malmsbury.

Malmsbury is a town in central Victoria, Australia on the Old Calder Highway (C794), 95 km north-west of the state capital, Melbourne and 11 km north-west of Kyneton. Situated close by the Coliban River, Malmsbury has a population of 1,101. Malmsbury is in the north western area of the Shire of Macedon Ranges local government area.

== Early history ==
The original inhabitants of the local area were the Dja Dja Wurrung people. European settlement began with squatters raising sheep and cattle. Gold was discovered in 1858 and the town became a service centre for diggers travelling to Bendigo and Castlemaine. Malmesbury [sic] Post Office opened on 9 November 1854, closed within two months, reopened in 1856, and was renamed Malmsbury around 1896, although the name Malmesbury remains in occasional use.

Malmsbury Reservoir began construction in 1866 and was completed in 1877. The dam wall at Malmsbury was enlarged in 1888 and the addition of steel flood gates in 1939 increased storage further. Deterioration has forced the flood gates to remain open which has reduced the capacity of the reservoir to pre-1939 levels.

The last of Victoria's early pioneers, James Thornton who came with John Batman to Melbourne in 1836 operated public houses for thirty years until the early 1890s.

Edward Davy, who invented the electric relay, making long-distance telegraphy possible, was mayor of Malmsbury three times in the mid-nineteenth century.

== Contemporary history ==
The Malmsbury area is known for its deposits of bluestone, used in the construction of notable buildings both locally and throughout the state. The town also houses the Malmsbury Youth Justice Centre, a custodial centre for young adult males aged 18–21 deemed too vulnerable for adult prison. On 25 January 2017, there was a riot at the Youth Justice Centre which involved 30 inmates, 15 of these inmates escaped the premises. 8 of these escapees were arrested shortly after however, the other 7 fled the area in stolen cars. Witnesses reported vehicles travelling at high speed through the Castlemaine area and footage was recorded of offenders stealing petrol from a service station.

Malmsbury has a railway station on the Melbourne to Bendigo railway line. The Malmsbury Viaduct is a large masonry arch rail bridge constructed over the Coliban River in 1859 and is classified "A" by the National Trust. The town's school uses the viaduct as its emblem. A stretch of the Calder Freeway (M79) bypassing Malmsbury was officially opened on 12 April 2008, and the removal of heavy through traffic was celebrated eight days later by the holding of a "monster street party" in the town.

Since the Calder Freeway bypass construction, Malmsbury has gained a reputation as a getaway destination for tourists across the country. During this period several restaurants have opened up in the town.

In December 2019, Malmsbury had its pharmacy opened to serve the local community in Malmsbury and its surroundings.

== Malmsbury Football Club ==
The Malmsbury Football Club was established in 1874 and they won the Kyneton District Football Association premiership in 1894,1905 and in 1920. Malmsbury FC played in Midland Football League in 1931 and 1932. Malmsbury FC were runners up in 1934 and later won the 1952 Castlemaine District Football Association premiership. Malmsbury joined the Daylesford Football League in 1953 and played Korweinguboora in a tied grand final and won the grand final replay in 1953 and won another flag in 1954.
