= Washington Street Tunnel =

Washington Street Tunnel may refer to:

- Washington Street Tunnel (Chicago), a road tunnel in Chicago
- Washington Street Tunnel (Boston), a subway tunnel in Boston
