= Malmsbury Viaduct =

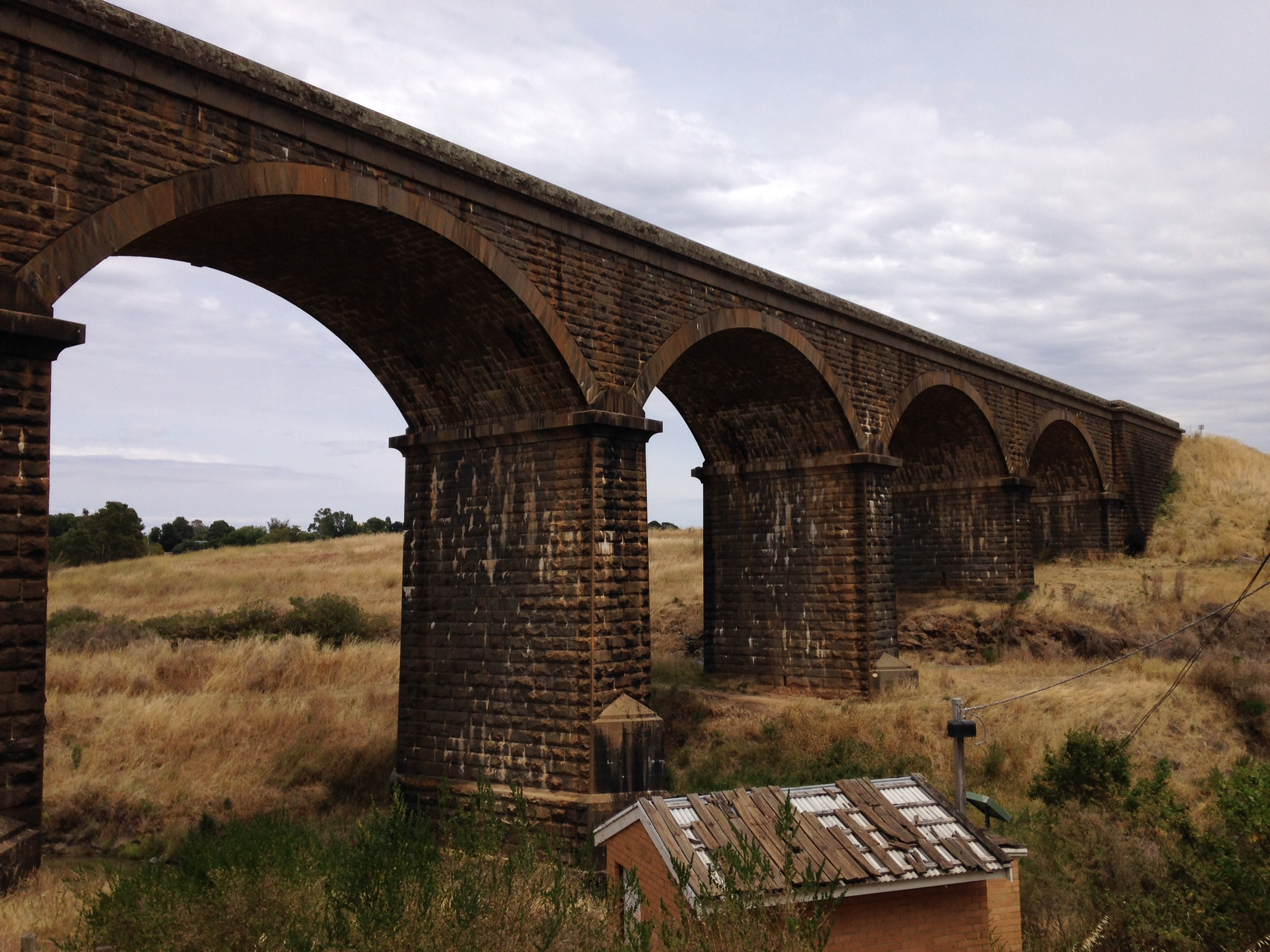
- Malmsbury Viaduct from Botanic Gardens
- Coordinates: 37°11′32″S 144°22′51″E
- Carries: Bendigo railway line
- Crosses: Coliban River
- Locale: Malmsbury, Victoria, Australia
- Owner: VicTrack

Characteristics
- Total length: 100 m (330 ft)
- Height: 25 m (82 ft)

History
- Constructed by: Victorian Railways Construction Branch
- Construction start: 1859
- Construction end: 1860

Location
- Interactive map of Malmsbury Viaduct

The Malmsbury Viaduct is a large brick and stone masonry arch bridge over the Coliban River at Malmsbury on the Bendigo Railway in Victoria Australia. It was erected as part of the Melbourne, Mount Alexander and Murray River Railway between 1858 and 1861, and was at the time the largest masonry arch railway bridge built in Victoria.

Construction of the Bendigo line commenced under the Melbourne, Mount Alexander and Murray River Railway Company in 1858, but this private consortium met with financial difficulties when it was unable to raise sufficient funds, and was bought out by the Victorian colonial government in 1860 when it formed the Victorian Railways Department.

The contract for the first stage of the line from Footscray to Sandhurst (now Bendigo), was let to Cornish and Bruce for £3,356,937.2s.2d ($6.714 million) with work commencing on 1 June 1858. Completion of the permanent way was to be by 31 July 1861.

The design work was then taken over by Captain Andrew Clarke, R. E., Surveyor-General of Victoria, with the bridge designs completed by William Bryson CE, Head Draftsman, who was responsible for many of the large structures such including bridges and viaducts under the supervision of George Christian Darbyshire for the Victorian Railway. William O’Hara, Senior Draftsman with the railways department, also had experience in the design of masonry structures and so probably also contributed to the design of the viaduct.

The bridge is over 100m long with five 18.3 metre spans, standing about 25 metres high. 132,000 cubic feet of bluestone for the bridge was quarried at the east end of Malmsbury and carted to the site by horse and drays.

The foundation stone for the viaduct was laid on 25 October 1859 and the bridge was completed on 24 October 1860.

It was listed on the Victorian Heritage Register in May 2000.

A celebration of the 150th anniversary of this event was held in 2010 organised by the Malmsbury Historical Society.
