= LaSalle Street Tunnel =

Traffic tunnel in Chicago, Illinois

Coordinates: 41°53′15.2″N 87°37′57.0″W

LaSalle St. Tunnel
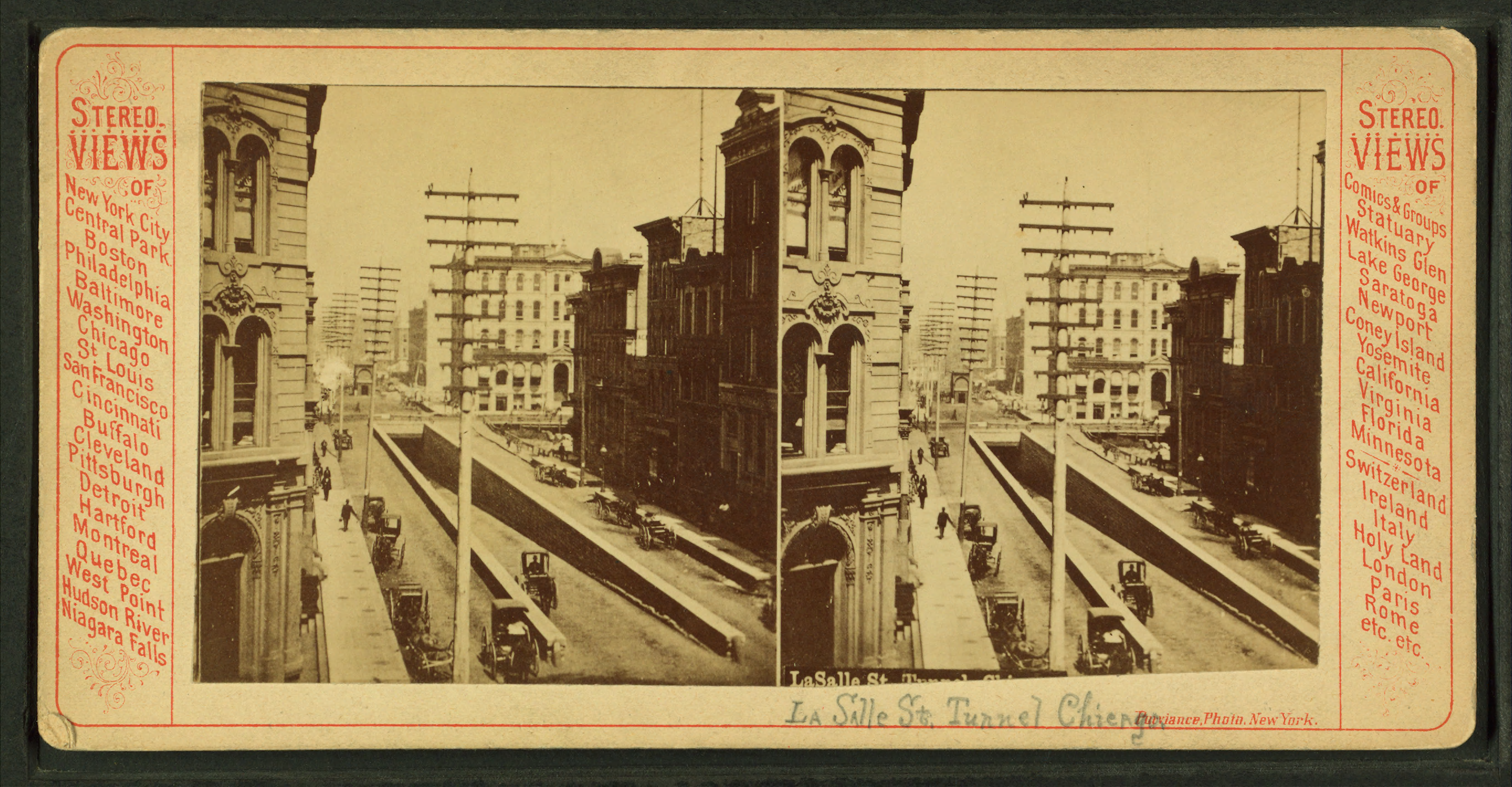
- South portal before 1888
- Interactive map of LaSalle St. Tunnel

Overview
- Status: Closed and covered
- Start: Michigan (Hubbard) St.
- End: Dearborn St.

Operation
- Opened: 1871 (public), 1888 (cable); 1912 (after lowering)
- Closed: 1939
- Owner: City of Chicago
- Operator: North Chicago Street Ry. Chicago Union Transit; Chicago Surface Lines

Technical
- Length: 1,887 ft (575.16 m) (as built)
- No. of lanes: 3
- Max elevation: 594 ft (181.05 m)
- Min elevation: 534 ft (162.76 m) (after lowering)
- Tunnel clearance: 15 feet 9 inches (4.80 m)
- Width: 30 ft (9.14 m)

The LaSalle Street Tunnel was Chicago's second traffic tunnel under the Chicago River. It was started November 3, 1869, and completed July 4, 1871. It was designed by William Bryson who was the resident engineer for the Washington Street Tunnel. It was 1,890 feet (576m) long, from Randolph Street north to Hubbard (then Michigan) Street, and cost $566,000.

== History ==
=== As built ===
Originally built with one lane for pedestrians and 2 lanes for horse-drawn traffic, by the 1880s it was in poor condition. On March 23, 1888, the North Chicago Street Railroad leased the tunnel. If they repaired it and made other local improvements they could use the tunnel exclusively for cable car service.

The reversing of the Chicago River in 1900 exposed the roof of the tunnel in the new riverbed and in 1904 the Federal government declared it a hazard to navigation. The tunnel was closed to cable cars on October 21, 1906.

=== Reconstruction ===
The approaches were deepened to a new lower tunnel level. The grades were aligned for the cars to enter from a shallow subway just below street level. The subway was not built, concrete ramps raised the tracks up to street grade.

The tunnel section under the river was removed and a two tube steel plate replacement built in a drydock on Goose Island was lowered into a trench in the riverbed. The tunnels connecting the approaches and the tubes were dug through and under the original tunnels.

=== After lowering ===
The deepened tunnel was opened to electric streetcar service on July 21, 1912. It was in use until November 27, 1939, when it was closed during the construction of the Milwaukee-Lake-Dearborn-Congress subway, the Lake & LaSalle (now Clark & Lake) station of which intersected the tunnel's south ramp under Lake Street. By 1950 the south approach had been covered, the tunnel and the north approach were filled and covered by 1953.

== See also ==
Washington St. Tunnel
