= Washington Street Tunnel (Chicago) =

Washington St. Tunnel
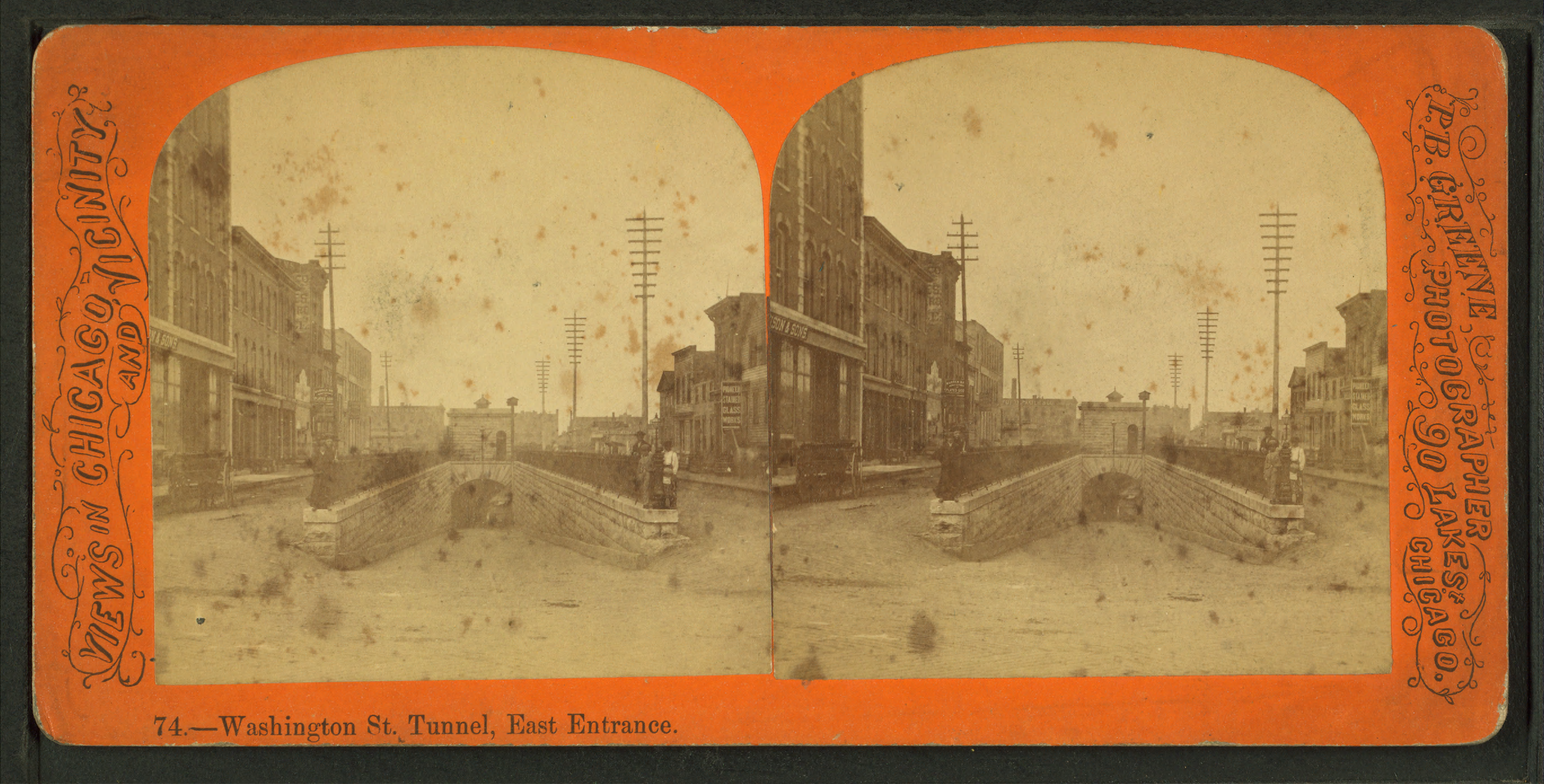
- East entrance (before 1884)
- Interactive map of Washington St. Tunnel

Overview
- Coordinates: 41°52′59.5″N 87°38′17.0″W
- Status: Closed and covered
- Start: Franklin St
- End: Clinton St.

Operation
- Opened: 1867 (public), 1890 (cable); 1911 (after lowering)
- Closed: 1954
- Owner: City of Chicago
- Operator: West Chicago Street RR. Chicago Union Transit; Chicago Surface Lines; Chicago Transit Authority

Technical
- Length: 1,605 ft (489.20 m) (as built)
- No. of lanes: 3
- Max elevation: 594 ft (181.05 m)
- Min elevation: 534 ft (162.76 m) (after lowering)

The Washington Street Tunnel was the first traffic tunnel under the Chicago River. J.L. Lake was awarded the contract to construct the tunnel in July 1867 and its construction was completed January 1, 1869. This tunnel was 1605 feet long, from Franklin Street west to Clinton Street, and cost $517,000.

== History ==
=== As built ===
Originally built of masonry with one lane for pedestrians and 2 lanes for horse-drawn traffic, by 1884 it was leaking and had been closed. In 1888 the West Chicago Street Railroad leased the tunnel. If they repaired it and built a vehicle bridge they could use the tunnel exclusively for cable car service. Construction began in 1888 and the tunnel was reopened August 12, 1890

The reversing of the Chicago River in 1900 lowered the water level and exposed the roof of the tunnel in the riverbed. Several ships ran aground on it, damaging the roof. In 1904 the Federal government declared it a hazard to navigation, it was closed on August 19, 1906.

=== Reconstruction ===
A wider, deeper concrete replacement was built under the original masonry. The approaches were deepened to a new lower tunnel level. The grades were aligned for the cars to enter from a shallow subway just below street level. The subway was not built, concrete ramps raised the tracks up to street grade. George W. Jackson was the contractor for rebuilding the tunnel.

=== After lowering ===
The tunnel reopened for electric streetcar service on January 29, 1911, and was in use until the end of streetcar service 1953. As of 2007, both approaches had been covered.

== Plans for subways ==
Plans were made to incorporate the tunnel into a high-level subway to run under Washington Street between Clinton Street and Grand Park. The plans were expanded after the Second World War to add high-level subway running parallel to the Washington Street line under Jackson Street, similarly using the tunnel located between Jackson and Van Buren Streets. Both would be tied into another subway tunnel to be dug under Clinton Street, proposed in the interim. The only construction accomplished in advance of these plans was the pair of portals in the Eisenhower Expressway median, 200 feet east of Halsted Street, constructed in 1952 simultaneously with the pair of portals for the Blue Line, and the double-wide station built at Peoria Street in 1964 to accommodate the anticipated platform north of the UIC-Halsted platform for the Blue Line. In 1951-1952, the plans were modified to use the Washington Street subway as a busway rather than as a train tunnel, while the Clinton and Jackson tunnels were merged and remained a rail plan. The plan was canceled in April 1962, although the design and placement of the Peoria Street station house went unchanged.

== See also ==
LaSalle Street Tunnel
Van Buren Street Tunnel
