= Edward Davy =

English physician, scientist, and inventor

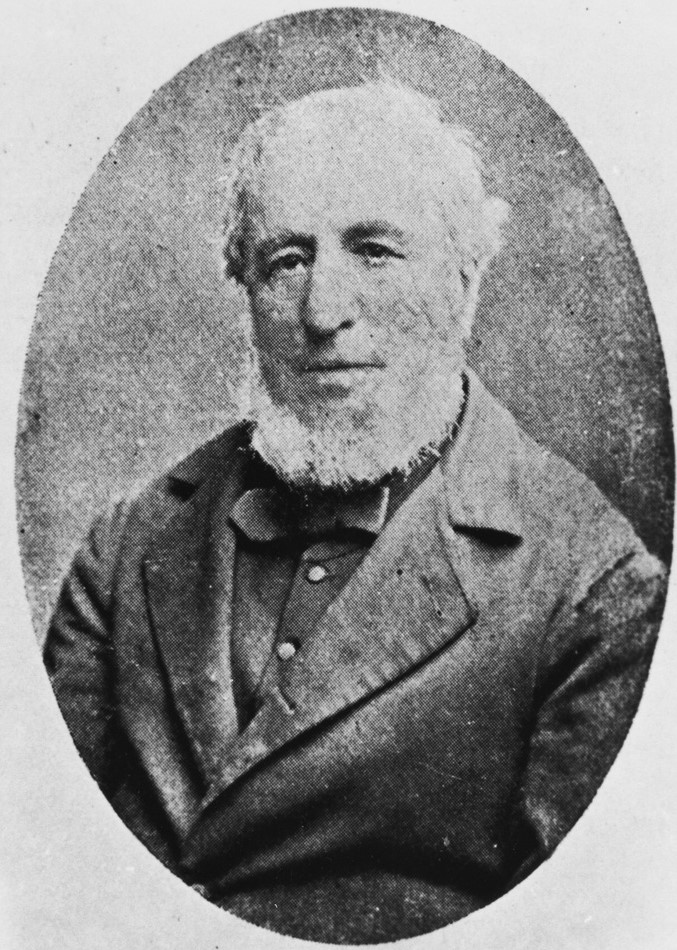
- Born: 16 June 1806; Ottery St Mary, Devon, England
- Died: 26 January 1885 (aged 78); Malmsbury, Victoria, Australia
- Known for: Telegraphy
- Scientific career
- Fields: Physics

Edward Davy (16 June 1806 – 26 January 1885) was an English physician, scientist, and inventor who played a prominent role in the development of telegraphy, and invented an electric relay.

Davy was born in Ottery St Mary, Devonshire, England, son of Thomas Davy (medical practitioner and house surgeon at Guy's Hospital, London). Edward Davy was educated at a school run by his maternal uncle in Tower Street, London. He was then apprenticed to Dr C. Wheeler, house surgeon at St Bartholomew's Hospital. Davy won the prize for botany in 1825, was licensed by the Worshipful Society of Apothecaries in 1828 and the Royal College of Surgeons in 1829. Soon after graduating, Davy began trading as an operative chemist under the name of Davy & Co. In 1836 he published a small book Experimental Guide to Chemistry, at the end of which was a catalogue of goods supplied by his firm. Davy is distantly related to Humphry Davy.

Davy published Outline of a New Plan of Telegraphic Communication in 1836 and carried out telegraphic experiments the following year. He demonstrated the operation of the telegraph over a mile of wire in Regent's Park. In 1837 he demonstrated a working model of the telegraph in Exeter Hall. This demonstration caused serious concern to rival telegraph developers William Fothergill Cooke and Charles Wheatstone, especially as Davy had been approaching railway companies who were also the main target for Cooke and Wheatstone. Both Davy and the exhibition hall were threatened with legal action on the grounds that they were infringing the Cooke and Wheatstone telegraph patent. Davy's telegraph was not protected by a patent at this stage, but one was granted in the following year, 1838, despite the objections of Cooke and Wheatstone. Davy invented a relay which used a magnetic needle which dipped into a mercury contact when an electric current passed through the surrounding coil. In recognition of this he was elected in 1885 as an honorary member of the Society of Telegraph Engineers and was informed of this by telegraph shortly before his death.

Davy apparently had some thoughts on a wireless telegraphy system. This system was an electrical-acoustic hybrid, but Davy's writings are far from clear exactly what was intended and nothing was put into practice. According to John Fahie, the best interpretation of Davy's concept is a chain of sound transmitters, such as a bell, and focused sound reflectors tuned to the transmission note to receive the signal. At each intermediate station the sound is renewed using electrical repeaters incorporating Davy's relay.

Davy's marriage broke down shortly after the Regent's Park demonstration and he found himself in litigation with his wife and her creditors. In August 1838 he fled to Australia to avoid them, giving up work on the telegraph in the process. His telegraph patents were purchased by the Electric Telegraph Company in 1847 for £600, mostly in order to obtain the rights to the electric relay invented by Davy. The rest of his telegraph system was not wanted, other than to prevent competitors from using it. He was editor of the Adelaide Examiner from June to July 1842 and was elected president of the Port Adelaide Mechanics' Institute at its inaugural meeting in 1851. Davy was a director and manager of the Adelaide Smelting Company and became chief assayer of the Government Assay Office in Adelaide in February 1852.

Davy was appointed assay master in Melbourne in July 1853 until the office was abolished in October 1854. For a short while, he took up farming near Malmsbury, Victoria then moved into Malmsbury.
