= Department of Railways and Roads =

Department overview
- Formed: 26 April 1871
- Preceding agencies: Department of Railways I; Department of Roads and Bridges
- Dissolved: 1 September 1877
- Superseding agencies: Department of Railways II; Public Works Department, Roads and Bridges Branch
- Parent board: Board of Land and Works
- Agency ID: PROV VA 2875

The Department of Railways and Roads was a subdepartment of the Victorian Government's Board of Land and Works, which administered the Australian state's railway system and main road network between 1871 and 1877.

== History ==
Amalgamation of the Department of Railways and the Department of Roads and Bridges to save on administration costs was proposed by the ministry of Chief Secretary and Premier John Alexander MacPherson in March 1870. The following year some parliamentarians argued in favour of broader reforms, combining the responsibilities of the Roads, Railways and Public Works departments into a single public service body. The restructure which occurred in April 1871, however, saw the Assistant Commissioner of Roads and Bridges appointed to the position of Secretary for Railways, enabling the joint administration of the departments. The combined department remained under the control of the Board of Land and Works, but road and railway expenses continued to be reported separately.

The department was abolished by an order of the Governor in 1877 which created a second Department of Railways and passed responsibility for roads and bridges to the Public Works Department.
