= Frederick William Wray =

Australian minister and military officer (1864–1943)

Frederick William Wray CMG CBE (29 September 1864 – 18 November 1943) was an Australian Anglican minister, army chaplain and colonial militia. Wray was born in Taradale, Victoria, and died in Sandringham, Melbourne, Victoria. His father was English-born and his mother was Irish.

== See also ==
- Field Flowers Goe
