= Jack Dore =

Australian rules footballer

Personal information
- Full name: Albert Richard Dore
- Born: 23 May 1875; Taradale, Victoria
- Died: 19 December 1937 (aged 62); Albury, New South Wales
- Original team: Geelong Grammar

Playing career^{1}
Years	Club	Games (Goals)
1898	Geelong	5 (0)
- ^{1} Playing statistics correct to the end of 1898.

Albert Richard "Jack" Dore (23 May 1875 – 19 December 1937) was an Australian rules footballer who played with Geelong in the Victorian Football League (VFL).
