= George Christian Darbyshire =

English and Australian civil engineer

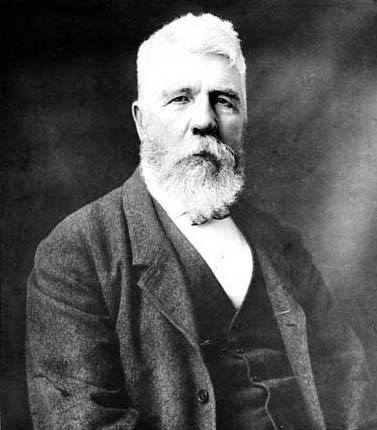
- George Christian Darbyshire
- Born: 1820; Derby
- Died: 5 June 1898 (aged 77); Hawthorn, Victoria
- Engineering career
- Discipline: civil engineer
- Projects: Bendigo railway line, Victoria

George Christian Darbyshire (1820 – 5 June 1898) was an English and Australian civil engineer. He was the second son of George Darbyshire, also a surveyor and railway engineer.

== Early life ==
Darbyshire was born at sea in 1820 and spent his early life in Derby, England. His father, George was a civil engineer who worked for George Stephenson. His mother was Elizabeth Darbyshire, née Smith. Later Darbyshire worked under Robert Stephenson and was involved on the various lines in the north engineered by Robert Stephenson. He married his wife Maria Wragg in 1846 when he was aged 21. Maria was the daughter of Samuel Wragg, an engineer who also worked for George Stephenson, and the widow of a man called Stafford who was killed in an accident.

== Training ==
Darbyshire in evidence to the Select Committee on the Chewton Railway Station given on 12 June 1863 related that his whole railway experience in Britain had been on the Midland Railway. Robert Stephenson was engineer for the Midland Railway on which construction began in February 1837. The Midland Railway, under Hudson became an extensive system through construction and acquisitions. Darbyshire's brother, John Darbyshire who also came out to Victoria, became Mining surveyor and later Inspector of Mines with the Victorian government Mines department.

However, Darbyshire may also have trained as a surveyor in England, being initially employed by his father in the firm of George Darbyshire and Sons, then with his brother in the partnership John and George C Darbyshire and were responsible for a number of surveys for Tithe maps in around 1839–41.

== Migration to Australia ==
Darbyshire travelled to Australia with his wife Maria on the Richard arriving in Melbourne on 7 July 1853 and became Engineer of Construction, and District Surveyor under the Victorian Government at Williamstown in 1854. He was also appointed deputy surveyor general of Victoria on 9 April 1857, to the Board of Science on 4 June 1858, and Territorial Magistrate for Wyndham on 7 April 1865.

Darbyshire's migration to Victoria coincides with the end of what is now termed the 'railway mania'. The drop off in competing proposals and line construction saw many men who had entered the new profession of civil engineer become unemployed. The obituaries of a number of these early members of the profession published by the ICE refer to the member being forced to retreat to the family property to be supported through the downturn, or for those from less well established families to find employment overseas.

== Victorian Railways ==
He took up a post as Engineer for the Melbourne, Mount Alexander and Murray River Railway Company in 1855. He was then appointed Engineer-in-Chief of the Victorian Railways, and was in that post from April 1856 to 17 May 1860, after which he was replaced by Thomas Higinbotham.

The Victorian Government Railway Department was established in 1856 as part of the Board of Land and Works. Among Darbyshire's first responsibilities was supervising the design and construction of the line to Sandhurst (Bendigo) and Echuca.

Darbyshire saw himself as an engineer, and was recruited to the Survey Department by the Surveyor General Andrew Clarke, as an engineer. In response to a request to describe an engineer when appearing before the Select Committee upon the Railways on 4 May 1860, he stated: A man who has actually been employed for some years, having actual experience in the working and construction is a civil engineer, as compared with the man who has no experience in works of construction.

Darbyshire was well experienced in railway work when he came to Victoria, and was highly skilled in surveying and designing a rail line. A small but significant example is that the lines were set out with the section in the stations above the general grade and at a flatter grade than the line. That produced a situation in which the trains approached the platform on an up grade that aided braking, and departed on a down grade that aided starting. Higinbotham was not aware of that detail and changed some station locations after he took over, to the detriment of efficient running. The proposed station at Chewton had to be abandoned because trains to Castlemaine could not stop on the grade at the point where Higinbotham had sited the station, and trains to Melbourne were unable to start up the grade if they stopped there.

== Surveying and later career ==
In the 1860s and 1870s, Darbyshire was a licensed surveyor undertaking township and rural surveys for Government and private practice. He may also have won a tender for surveying part of the Victoria/South Australia Border, and was responsible for the Town Plan of Lorne in 1871.

Darbyshire had risen to District Surveyor at Williamstown, the most senior position in the Department under the Deputy Surveyor General, when Clarke directed him to carry out surveys for country rail lines.

Darbyshire accepted the appointment as Chief Engineer of the Railways on the condition that he retained his substantive appointment as District Surveyor Williamstown and could return to that at any time (See letter of 28 May 1856 referred to above.). He acted as Deputy Surveyor General from May to July 1857 while holding the position of Chief engineer. He returned to his position as District Surveyor on resigning his position as Chief Engineer Railways.

Darbyshire was also Surveyor General of Victoria in 1857 and reported extensively on railway and bridge engineering to a number of select committees and is credited with the design of a number of early and important railway structures such as the Saltwater River Bridge on the Maribyrnong River. He was responsible for the design of the Geelong to Ballarat railway as well as that to Bendigo and Echuca. As engineer in Chief, he was responsible for supervising the design of five major iron bridges, including the Warren truss Moorabool Viaduct, the plate girder bridge at Jackson's Creek, and in particular, the five span continuous box girder viaduct at Taradale. In Britain at the time they were tentatively doing two span continuous girders.

Darbyshire remained in the Survey Department and became Surveyor General. He was one of the 137 officials removed from office on "Black Wednesday" on 8 January 1878 when the Government was denied supply. He, like a number of other senior officers, was not reappointed.

Darbyshire returned to the railway department in 1881 as Engineer for Construction and Surveys, laying out many new lines. On the unexpected death of Robert Watson in 1891 he again became Chief Engineer a position he held until his near his death.

In other areas of interest, Darbyshire was appointed as a trustee of the Werribee Cemetery in February 1865. He is listed in 1891 in the first list published of Licensed Surveyors under the Transfer of Land Act, 1890 with his address as Railway Department, Melbourne.

Darbyshire had offices in Temple Court on Collins Street but resided at a substantial property at The Grange in Wyndham Werribee, where he contributed to the local community as Magistrate. In his last years he moved to Power Street Hawthorn, where he lived out his life as a Pensioner of the Victorian Government (Railways) and where he died on 5 March 1898 aged 78 years. He was buried at Werribee Cemetery.

Contemporary photograph –

== Bibliography ==
- Chappel, K. L. Surveying for Land Settlement in Victoria 1836-1960. Melbourne: Office of Surveyor General, Victoria, 1996.
- Cumming, D.A. Some Public Works Engineers in Victoria in the Nineteenth Century Technology Report No. TR-85/10. August 1985.
- Darbyshire, Geo. C. Melbourne and River Murray Railway Kyneton deviations : presented to both Houses of Parliament by His Excellency's command Melbourne : John Ferres, Govt. Printer, 1860. Parliamentary paper (Victoria. Parliament); 1859–1860, no. 50. Accompanied by: Plan of the north Kyneton deviation as laid out, together with the south Kyneton deviation as proposed by the committee of the Legislative Assembly, 1859 & '60.
- Kain, Roger J. P. Richard R. Oliver, Rodney E. J. Fry, Sarah A. H. Wilmot, The tithe maps of England and Wales: a cartographic analysis and county-by-county catalogue, Cambridge University Press, 1995

Preceded by George Horne	Surveyor General of Victoria; 1857	Succeeded by Clement Hodgkinson
