= Taradale, Victoria =

Taradale
- Town
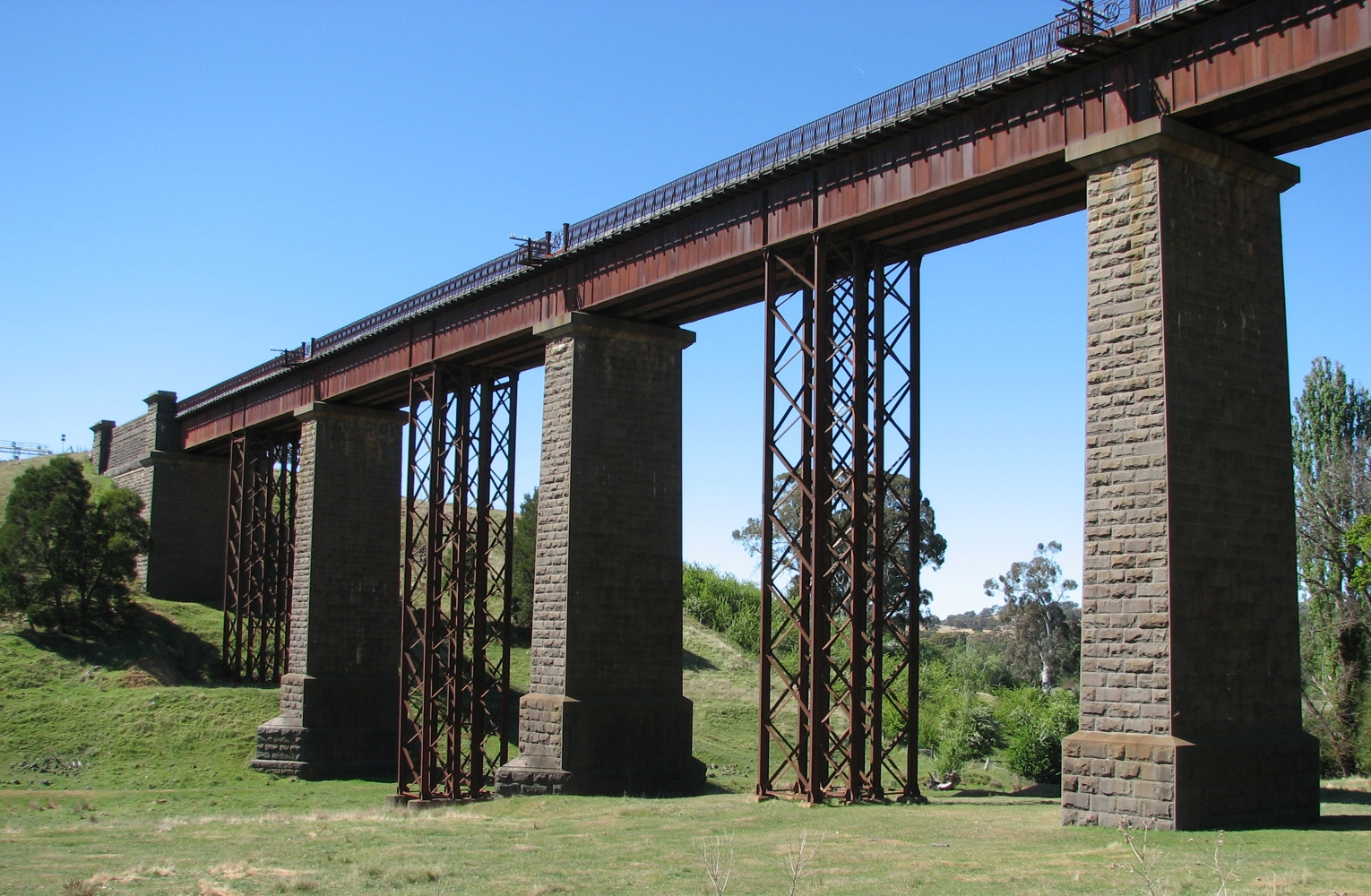
- Taradale Viaduct

- Interactive map of Taradale
- Coordinates: 37°08′S 144°21′E
- Country: Australia
- State: Victoria
- LGA: Shire of Mount Alexander
- Location: 103 km (64 mi) NW of Melbourne; 47 km (29 mi) SE of Bendigo; 18 km (11 mi) SE of Castlemaine; 17 km (11 mi) NW of Kyneton
- Established: 1861

Government
  - State electorate: Macedon
  - Federal division: Bendigo
- Elevation: 384 m (1,260 ft)

Population
  - Total: 448 (2016 census)
- Postcode: 3447

Taradale is a town in Victoria, Australia. It is located beside the Calder Highway between Melbourne and Bendigo. Its local government area is the Shire of Mount Alexander. At the 2016 census, Taradale had a population of 448.

The town is also located on the Melbourne to Bendigo railway line, although the station was closed in 1976. The Taradale Viaduct, designed by William Bryson, carries the railway 36 metres above Back Creek, and was built between 1858 and 1862.

Taradale has now been bypassed by the Calder Freeway.

Facilities in town include a petrol station, post office and a cafe.

There is also a primary school, public hall and CFA fire station plus a riverside park, picnic area, mineral springs and playground.

Taradale provides a convenient approach to the Fryers Ridge Nature Conservation Reserve, an excellent wildflower area. The observation period runs from August to December.

== History ==
Establishment of Taradale began with the discovery of gold in Central Victoria around 1851. The town lies on the route between Melbourne and Castlemaine, and was possibly a stopover for the famous Cobb and Co. coach line which began in 1854 between Melbourne and Bendigo.

A number of gold mining activities were carried out in and around the township itself including washing for alluvial gold in Back Creek and the sinking of shafts.

Taradale Primary School opened in 1855.

Taradale Post Office opened on 1 March 1856.

A petition was made to the Governor of Victoria to proclaim the Municipality of Taradale in 1861. The town was named after the birthplace of Sir Roderick Murchison, Tarradale House, in Scotland, and many of the streets are named after famous figures of the day in science and geology, including Charles Lyell, Roderick Murchison, Michael Faraday and Humphry Davy.

== Notable people ==
Notable people from, or who have lived in, Taradale:

- William Chalmers, Anglican minister
- Robert Russell, surveyor
- Frederick William Wray, Anglican minister, army chaplain
- Jack Dore, Australian rules footballer

One of the early residents of the area, an Irish emigrant named Henry Alley, moved to New Zealand in the late 1850s and named his farm in the Hawke's Bay area, "Taradale", which is now a thriving town.
