= Melbourne, Mount Alexander and Murray River Railway Company =

The Melbourne, Mount Alexander and Murray River Railway Company
- Formerly: Mount Alexander Company
- Type: Railway company
- Industry: Railway
- Founded: February 8, 1853; 173 years ago in Victoria, Australia
- Defunct: May 23, 1856
- Fate: Taken over by the colonial government and became part of the Department of Railways
- Area served: Victoria, Australia

The Melbourne, Mount Alexander and Murray River Railway Company, colloquially known as the Mount Alexander Company, was a railway company in Victoria, Australia. It was established on 8 February 1853, with the aim of building a railway from Melbourne to Echuca on the Victorian-NSW border, as well as a branch railway to Williamstown. The company struggled to make any progress and on 23 May 1856, the colonial government took over the company and it became part of the newly established Department of Railways, part of the Board of Land and Works. The Department of Railways became Victorian Railways in 1859.

Construction of the Bendigo line commenced in 1858, but this private consortium also met with financial difficulties when it was unable to raise sufficient funds, and was bought out by the Victorian colonial government. The design work was then taken over by Captain Andrew Clarke, R. E., Surveyor-General of Victoria, with bridge designs completed by Bryson and O'Hara The contract for the first stage of the line from Footscray to Sandhurst (now Bendigo), was let to Cornish and Bruce for £3,356,937.2s.2d ($6.714 million) with work commencing on 1 June 1858. Completion of the permanent way was to be by 31 July 1861.

Clarke appointed William O’Hara to design bridges and viaducts, while William Edward Bryson stated to the Select Committee of the Legislative Assembly on Railway Contracts that he had designed most of the large bridges on the line. Clarke clearly influenced the design of the railway in setting the standards for the line. However, it became a very costly undertaking, which stretched the colonial finances and the design principles were abandoned from then on, in favour of more lightly constructed lines. Bryson was described as a civil engineer in 1857 when he was a member of the Philosophical Institute of Victoria. He was also a member of the Royal Society of Victoria in 1859-60 and was employed at the "Government Railway Office". He published "Resources of Victoria & their development" in 1860 in the Royal Society's Transactions.

Companies
First	Melbourne, Mount Alexander and Murray River Railway Company; 8 February 1853 – 19 March 1856	Succeeded by Victorian Railways
