= Chicago Surface Lines =

American public transport operator

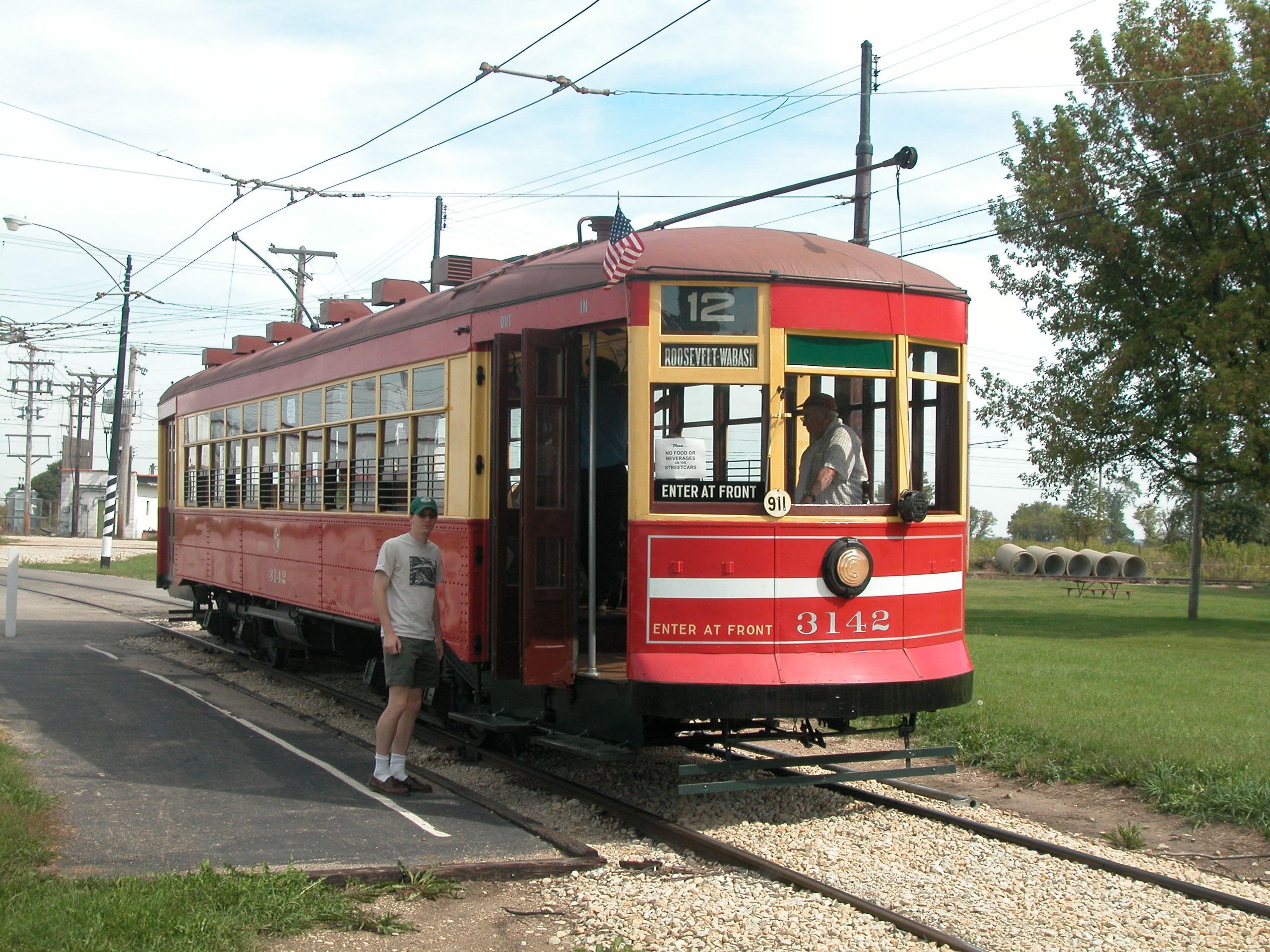
- Chicago Surface Lines car 3142 at the Illinois Railway Museum

Overview
- Dates of operation: 1913; 113 years ago– 1947; 79 years ago
- Successor: Chicago Transit Authority

Technical
- Track gauge: 4 ft 8 1/2 in (1,435 mm)

The Chicago Surface Lines (CSL) was the operator of the street railway system of Chicago, Illinois, from 1913 to 1947. The firm is a predecessor of today's publicly owned operator, the Chicago Transit Authority.

== History ==
The first streetcars in Chicago were horse cars run by the Chicago City Railway Company and the North Chicago City Railway Company around 1858-1861. This method was slow and expensive, and the companies began substituting cable cars in the 1880s. Chicago City Railway was the first in (1881), and with the addition of the Chicago Passenger Railway (1883) and the West Chicago Street Railroad Company (1887), Chicago had the largest cable railway system in the world. The north and west side cable car systems were constructed by an investment syndicate under the direction of Charles Yerkes.

It was also in the 1880s that electric-powered "trolleys" first became practical. The Chicago companies hesitated at first to install these faster and more efficient systems because of their heavy investment in cable cars. But the smaller Illinois cities and the Calumet Electric Street Railway of the South Side built successful systems, causing the Chicago companies to feel themselves dropping behind. By the mid-1890s most of them had begun the conversion to electricity, which was completed in 1906.

A political conflict dubbed the Chicago Traction Wars arose concerning the franchise and ownership of the city's streetcars.

The 1890s saw the consolidation of many of the Chicago companies, and this reorganization continued into the next century. In 1907 to 1909, the companies were granted franchises pursuant to various ordinances, under which the city reserved the right to purchase the systems. The Settlement Ordinance of 1907 imposed various operating requirements on two of the underlying companies, the Chicago City Railway Company and Chicago Railways, and established a new bureau, the Board of Supervising Engineers (Chicago Traction), a board of engineers and accountants with responsibilities for assuring compliance with the ordinances, and setting standards for equipment and construction.

Through Routes over the lines of several companies were instituted in 1910, and, for instance, resulted in joint service by the Chicago City Railway Company and Calumet and South Chicago Railway between downtown and 119th Street via Cottage Grove. There was also joint service operated by the South Chicago City Railway and the Hammond, Whiting, and East Chicago Electric Railway into Indiana, with each company collecting its own fare, which continued until the Hammond company converted to buses in 1940.

The continuous reorganization was finally completed by the Unification Ordinance of 1913, which stipulated that all lines would come under the management of a single operating association called the Chicago Surface Lines (CSL), and unified operations commenced in 1914. Four companies formed the CSL: the Chicago Railways Company, Chicago City Railway, Calumet and South Chicago Railway, and Southern Street Railway. (Note: The Chicago City Railway had a subsidiary, the Chicago & Western Railway, and 95% of the stock of the City Railway and all of the stock of the Southern, Calumet, and Western were in a collateral trust, to secure certain bonds.) At this time, Chicago had the largest street railway system, the longest one-fare ride, the longest average ride, and the most liberal transfer privileges in the world.

The 1920s saw continued growth despite the increasing competition from the automobile, and while the 1933-1934 World's Fair and wartime demand supported ridership, the underlying companies were bankrupt. Creditors' bills were filed against the Chicago Railways in 1926 and the Chicago City Railway and Calumet and South Chicago in 1930, resulting in the appointment of receivers and bringing their property into the custody of the Federal District Court. In 1944, the proceedings were converted to those under the Bankruptcy Act, and trustees were appointed. By June 10, 1958 (line 22), the Chicago Transit Authority, which took over the Chicago Surface Lines in 1947, had abandoned the remaining streetcars lines, which were "bustituted." Before that, CSL had introduced gasoline buses for light routes in 1927, and trolley buses to the northwest side starting April 17, 1930. Trolleybus system of Chicago scrapped March 25, 1973.

== Fleet ==
The Chicago Surface Lines was primarily a trolley operation, with approximately 3100 streetcars on the roster at the time of the CTA takeover. It purchased small lots of motor buses, totaling 693 at the time of the CTA takeover, mostly consisting of smaller buses used on extension routes or to replace two-man streetcars on routes such as Hegewisch and 111th Street, because conductors were required to flag streetcars across mainline railroads where there was not a watchman at the crossing. Most postwar PCC cars were scrapped and parts reused in the 6000-series and 1-50 series rapid transit cars for the CTA. The trolley bus fleet consisted of 152 vehicles.

=== Streetcars ===
A table of passenger railway cars in use during the CSL era is shown below. Ownership resided with one of the underlying companies: Chicago Railways (CRY), Chicago City Railway (CCR), Calumet & South Chicago Railway (CSC) or Southern Street Railway (SSR). Other predecessors include Chicago Union Traction (CUT), absorbed into Chicago Railways in 1908, and Chicago & Southern Traction (C&ST), absorbed into Chicago City Railway in 1912. Following unification many car orders (e.g. 169 Cars, Sedans, PCCs) were split between the various underlying companies.

Fleet No.	Qty	Owner	Builder	Year	Nickname	Notes	Photo
101-700	600	CRY	Pullman	1908	Old Pullmans	144, 225, 460 preserved	144
701-750	50	CRY	Pressed Steel	1909	Pressed Steels		741
751-1100	350	CRY	Pullman	1910	New Pullmans		786
1101-1423	323	CRY	St. Louis	1903-1906	Matchboxes	Ex-CUT 4630-4952; 1374 preserved	1386
1424-1428	5	CRY	Brill	1903		Ex-CUT 4625-4629	
1429-1505	77	CRY	CUT	1899	Bowling Alleys	Ex-CUT 4475-4554; 1467 preserved	1457
1506-1720	215	CRY	CSL	1911-1912	Turtlebacks		1532
1721-1785	65	CRY	CSL	1923	169 Cars		1731
1800-1899	100	CRY	CSL	1913-1914	Flexible Flyers		1818
1900-1949	50	CRY	American	1913-1914	Flexible Flyers		1901
1950-1999	50	CRY	Southern	1913-1914	Flexible Flyers		
2000-2005	6	CRY	Brill	1920	Birneys		2001
2006	1	CRY	CSL	1921	Birney		2006
2501-2625	125	CCR	St. Louis	1901	St. Louis Rebuilds		2530
2701-2780	80	CCR	St. Louis	1903	St. Louis Rebuilds		2741
2801-2815	15	CSC	St. Louis	1901		Ex-C&SC 701-715	2803
2816-2823	8	CSC	Brill	1903		Ex-C&SC 801-808	2819
2824-2840	17	CSC	Kuhlman	1904-1908		Ex-C&SC 809-825	2839
2841-2845	5	CSC	Jewett	1903		Ex-C&SC 826-830; 2843 preserved	2845
2846-2856	11	CSC	SCCR	1907	Interstates	Ex-C&SC 831-841; 2846 preserved	2851
2857-2858	2	CSC	Kuhlman	1910		Ex-C&SC funeral cars 1-2	
2859	1	CSC	CSL	1924			2859
2900-2903	4	CCR	Brill	1920	Birneys		2901
2904-2922	19	CCR	CSL	1922	Sewing Machines		2913
3000-3089	90	CRY	Brill	1914-1915			3025
3090	1	CRY	American	1918			
3091	1	CRY	CSL	1919			
3092	1	CRY	CSL	1921	Sewing Machine		
3093-3118	26	CRY	CSL	1922	Sewing Machines		3100
3119-3160	42	CRY	Brill	1923	169 Cars	3142 preserved	3134
3161-3178	18	CRY	Cummings	1923	169 Cars		3169
3179-3201	23	CRY	CSL	1923	Sun Parlors		3182
3202-3231	30	CRY	CSL	1924	Multiple Unit Cars		3210
3232-3261	30	CRY	Lightweight Noiseless	1925	Multiple Unit Cars		3250
3262-3281	20	CRY	Brill	1926			3267
3282-3301	20	CRY	St. Louis	1926			
3302-3321	20	CRY	Cummings	1926			3311
3322-3341	20	CRY	CSL	1929	Sedans		3337
3342-3361	20	CRY	Brill	1929	Sedans		3349
3362-3381	20	CRY	Cummings	1929	Sedans		3381
4000	1	CRY	CSL	1925		Articulated; rebuilt from 1101 to 1102	4000
4001	1	CRY	Pullman-Standard	1934		Preserved	4001
4002-4051	50	CRY	St. Louis	1936	Blue Geese	PCC cars; 4021 preserved	4013
4052-4061	10	CRY	St. Louis	1947	Green Hornets	PCC cars	4056
4062-4371	310	CRY	Pullman-Standard	1946-1947	Green Hornets	PCC cars	4121
4372-4411	40	CRY	St. Louis	1947-1948	Green Hornets	PCC cars; 4391 preserved	4391
5001-5200	200	CCR	Brill	1905	Little Brills		5111
5201-5600	400	CCR	Brill	1906-1908	Big Brills		5555
5601-5621	21	CCR	Brill	1910			5614
5622-5650	29	SSR	Brill	1910			5637
5651-5665	15	CCR	Kuhlman	1907	Crete Suburbans	Ex-C&ST 126-140	5653
5701-5702	2	CCR	CCR	1910			5702
5703-5827	125	CCR	Brill	1913	Nearsides		5721
5900-5999	100	CCR	Brill	1913			
6000-6137	138	CCR	Brill	1914-1915			6072
6138-6146	9	CCR	American	1918	Odd Seventeen		6139
6147-6154	8	CCR	CSL	1919	Odd Seventeen		6153
6155-6158	4	CCR	CSL	1923	169 Cars		
6159-6186	28	CCR	Brill	1923	169 Cars		6169
6187-6198	12	CCR	Cummings	1923	169 Cars		6194
6199-6218	20	CCR	CSL	1924	Multiple Unit Cars		6199
6219-6238	20	CCR	Lightweight Noiseless	1924	Multiple Unit Cars		6224
6239	1	CCR	CSL	1924			
6240-6252	13	CCR	Brill	1926			6251
6253-6265	13	CCR	St. Louis	1926			6260
6266-6279	14	CCR	Cummings	1926			
6280-6293	14	CCR	CSL	1929	Sedans		6283
6294-6306	13	CCR	Brill	1929	Sedans		6303
6307-6319	13	CCR	Cummings	1929	Sedans		6310
7001	1	CCR	Brill	1934			7001
7002-7034	33	CCR	St. Louis	1936	Blue Geese	PCC cars	7021
7035-7274	240	CCR	St. Louis	1947	Green Hornets	PCC cars	7043
8000-8030	31	CRY	CSL	1921		Trailers	8012
8031-8060	30	CRY	Brill	1921-1922		Trailers	8036
9000-9019	20	CCR	CSL	1921		Trailers	
9020-9039	20	CCR	Brill	1922		Trailers; 9020 preserved	9037
9040-9046	7	CCR	CSL	1923		Trailers	9046

=== Electric Trolley Buses ===
A table of electric trolley buses owned by CSL is shown below. In 1952 all trolley buses still in service were renumbered by Chicago Transit Authority by adding "9" to the beginning of their number (e.g. 193 becoming 9193).

Fleet No.	Builder	Model	Year	Photo	Notes
51-79	Twin Coach	40	1930	51	
80-85	Brill	T40	1930	83	84 preserved
86-91	St. Louis		1930	86	
92-98	Twin Coach	40TT	1930		
99-105	Brill	T40	1930		
106-107	ACF	E1	1930	107	
108-114	Twin Coach	40TT	1930		
115-122	Brill	T40	1930	118	
123-124	Cincinnati		1930		
125-129	Twin Coach	40TT	1931	127	
130-134	Brill	T40	1931	132	
135-139	St. Louis		1931	138	
140-149	Twin Coach	40TT	1931	142	
150-160	Brill	T40	1931		
161-164	Cincinnati		1931	161	
165-170	Pullman		1935	170	166 preserved
171-185	St. Louis		1936	177	
186-202	Brill	T40S	1937	198	192, 193 preserved

=== Motor Buses ===
A table of motor buses owned by the CSL is shown below. In September 1944 all existing buses, previously numbered in separate series depending on corporate owner, were renumbered into a unified series.

Fleet No.	Builder	Model	Year	Owner	Notes	Photo
1-5	Twin Coach	40	1930	CRY	Renumbered 1101-1105	1
6-7	Twin Coach	40	1930	CRY	Renumbered 1106-1107	
301-303	Twin Coach	40	1928	CCR	Renumbered 1108-1110	
401-402	ACF	H13S	1934	CCR	Renumbered 2109-2110	
403-414	White	684	1934	CCR	Renumbered 3109-3120	
415	American Car & Foundry	H13S	1935	CCR	Renumbered 2111	
416	Superior/Ford	51	1936	CCR	Renumbered 4104	
417	Superior/Reo	2LM	1936	CCR	Renumbered 5104	417
418-420	White	706M	1936	CCR	Renumbered 3204-3206	420
421-428	White	805M	1937	CCR	Renumbered 3210-3217	428
429-432	ACF	H13S	1938	CCR	Renumbered 2207-2210	430
433-434	White	805M	1939	CCR	Renumbered 3311-3312	
435-436	Twin Coach	30G	1942	CCR	Renumbered 1307-1308	
437-440	Yellow	TG3205	1942	CCR	Renumbered 6216-6219	
446-451	Yellow	TD3605	1942	CCR	Renumbered 6301-6306	448
501-508	ACF	H13S	1935	CRY	Renumbered 2101-2108	
509-516	White	684	1935	CRY	Renumbered 3101-3108	510
517-519	Superior/Ford	51	1936	CRY	Renumbered 4101-4103	519
520-522	Superior/Reo	2LM	1936	CRY	Renumbered 5101-5103	
523-525	White	706M	1936	CRY	Renumbered 3201-3203	
526-563	Twin Coach	30R	1937	CRY	Renumbered 1201-1238	530
564-575	Ford	70	1937	CRY	Renumbered 4201-4212	565
576-581	ACF	H13S	1938	CRY	Renumbered 2201-2206	
582-591	White	805M	1939	CRY	Renumbered 3301-3310	586
592-625	Yellow	TG2706	1941	CRY	Renumbered 6101-6134	594
626-631	Twin Coach	30G	1942	CRY	Renumbered 1301-1306	1305
632-646	Yellow	TG3205	1942	CRY	Renumbered 6201-6215	
801-809	ACF	H13S	1935	CSC	Renumbered 2112-2120	
810-812	White	706M	1937	CSC	Renumbered 3207-3209	
813-822	White	805M	1938	CSC	Renumbered 3221-3230	821
823-825	White	805M	1939	CSC	Renumbered 3313-3315	825
826	Twin Coach	30G	1942	CSC	Renumbered 1309	
827	Yellow	TG3205	1942	CSC	Renumbered 6220	
1400	Twin Coach	34S	1946	CRY	Renumbered 1620	
1401-1404	Twin Coach	34S	1946	CCR/CSC	Renumbered 1621-1624	1402
1600-1606	Twin Coach	38S	1946	CCR		1605
1607-1608	Twin Coach	38S	1946	CCR/SSR		
1609-1614	Twin Coach	38S	1946	CCR		
1615-1619	Twin Coach	38S	1947	CCR		
1800-1817	Twin Coach	44D	1947	CCR		1814
2301-2350	ACF-Brill	C36	1946	CRY		
2351-2358	ACF-Brill	C36	1946	CSC		
2359-2433	ACF-Brill	C36	1947	CCR		2363
2500-2534	ACF-Brill	C44	1948	CRY		2505
2535-2544	ACF-Brill	C44	1948	CCR		
2545	ACF-Brill	C44	1948	CSC		
2546-2605	ACF-Brill	C44	1947	CRY		
3401-3402	White	798	1944	CRY		
3403-3416	White	798	1944	CCR	3407 preserved	3411
3417-3420	White	798	1944	CSC		
3421-3440	White	798	1945	CRY		3426
3441-3485	White	798	1946	CRY		3444
3486-3495	White	798	1946	CCR/CSC		
3496-3497	White	798	1947	CCR		
3498-3502	White	798	1947	CSC		
3503-3540	White	798	1947	CRY		
3541-3572	White	798	1947	CCR		
3573-3597	White	798	1948	CCR		
4301-4309	Ford	29B	1945	CSC		
4310-4327	Ford	29B	1945	CRY		
4328-4335	Ford	29B	1945	CCR		
4336-4350	Ford	69B	1947	CRY		4348
4351-4354	Ford	69B	1947	CCR		
4355	Ford	69B	1947	CSC		
6401-6410	GMC	TG4007	1944	CCR		6410
6501-6512	GMC	TD4506	1946	CRY		6506
6513-6518	GMC	TD4506	1946	CCR/CSC		6518
6519-6520	GMC	TD4506	1946	CSC		
6521-6530	GMC	TDH4507	1947	CRY		
6800-6823	GMC	TGH3609	1946	CRY		
6824	GMC	TGH3609	1946	CCR/CSC		
6825-6833	GMC	TGH3609	1946	CCR/SSR		6830
6834-6838	GMC	TGH3609	1946	CCR		
7100-7116	Mack	C41GT	1947	CRY		7106

== Routes ==
The CSL had dozens of routes and over 1,000 miles (1,600 km) of trackage at its height. The table below shows a basic overview of CSL routes at their height. Many changes to routing and terminals were made at various times. Abandonment dates noted are dates that routes were completely changed over to bus or trolley bus, or eliminated altogether. Many routes were converted in sections. Some routes, notably through routes, that were eliminated prior to the formation of the CSL are not included.

Route	Terminus	Terminus	Abandoned	Notes
Archer Avenue	Lake & State	Archer & Cicero	May 30, 1948	
Archer-38th Street	Lake & State	38th & Central Park	February 15, 1948	
Argo (63rd Extension)	63rd & Oak Park	63rd & Archer	April 11, 1948	
Armitage Avenue	Clark & Lincoln	Armitage & Grand	June 24, 1951	Converted to trolley bus
Ashland Avenue	Southport & Clark	Ashland & 95th	February 13, 1954	Through Route 9
Belmont Avenue	Belmont & Central	Belmont & Halsted	January 9, 1949	Converted to trolley bus
Blue Island-26th	26th & Kenton	Monroe & Dearborn	May 11, 1952	
Blue Island-Wells	North & Clark	Blue Island & Western	September 14, 1924	Through Route 12
Broadway	Devon & Clark	State & Polk	February 16, 1957	
Broadway-State	Devon & Clark	119th & Morgan	December 5, 1955	
Cermak Road	Cermak & Calumet	Cermak & Kenton	May 30, 1954	
Cermak-Lawndale	Cermak & Kedzie	33rd & Lawndale	October 1, 1945	
Chicago Avenue	Ohio & Lake Shore Drive	Chicago & Austin	May 11, 1952	Converted to trolley bus
Cicero Avenue	Montrose & Cicero	25th & Cicero	November 25, 1951	Converted to trolley bus
South Cicero Avenue	Archer & Cicero	63rd & Cicero	January 6, 1941	
Clark-Wentworth	Clark & Howard	81st & Halsted	September 8, 1957	Through Route 22
Clybourn Avenue	Belmont & Clybourn	Harrison & State	May 4, 1947	
Clybourn-Wentworth	Belmont & Clybourn	79th & Halsted	September 13, 1924	Through Route 2
Cottage Grove-Broadway	Devon & Kedzie	56th & Lake Park	October 7, 1946	Through Route 1
Cottage Grove-Pullman	Randolph & Garland Court	115th & St. Lawrence	June 19, 1955	Through Route 4
Cottage Grove-South Chicago	Randolph & Garland Court	93rd & Baltimore	December 4, 1949	Through Route 5
North Damen Avenue	Fullerton & Damen	Blue Island & Damen	May 13, 1951	
South Damen Avenue	47th & Damen	74th & Damen	January 26, 1948	
Diversey Avenue	Pulaski & Diversey	Kimball & Diversey	April 17, 1930	Converted to trolley bus
Division Street	Division & Mozart	State & Van Buren	February 4, 1951	
West Division Street	Division & Austin	Division & Grand	July 9, 1946	
Division-Van Buren	Division & Mozart	Van Buren & Kedzie	February 4, 1951	
Elston Avenue	Lawrence & Elston	Dearborn & Randolph	January 21, 1951	
Ewing-Brandon (Hegewisch)	Burley & 118th	Brandon & Brainard	October 21, 1946	
Fullerton Avenue	Central & Fullerton	Halsted & Fullerton	December 4, 1949	Converted to trolley bus
Fulton-21st Street	Fulton & Western	21st & Marshall	May 7, 1947	
Grand Avenue	Harlem & Grand	Navy Pier	April 1, 1951	Converted to trolley bus
Halsted Street	Waveland & Broadway	Halsted & 79th	May 29, 1954	
Halsted Street Extension (Vincennes)	111th & Vincennes	119th & Vincennes	July 22, 1946	
Halsted-Archer	Halsted & Waveland	63rd & Union	1924	Through Route 13
Halsted-Madison	Grace & Halsted	26th & Halsted	July 3, 1933	Through Route 18
Hammond	63rd & Vernon	106th & Indianapolis	June 9, 1940	Thru service to Hammond, Ind. via HW&EC
Harrison	Harrison & Central	Van Buren & Dearborn	February 29, 1948	
Harrison-Adams	Harrison & Central	Adams & Dearborn	February 29, 1948	
Indiana Avenue	51st & South Park	State & Lake	May 24, 1953	
Irving Park	Irving Park & Neenah	Irving Park & Broadway	November 7, 1948	Converted to trolley bus
Kedzie Avenue	Bryn Mawr & Kedzie	Marquette & Kedzie	May 29, 1954	Through Route 17
Kedzie-California	California & Roscoe	Marquette & Kedzie	May 29, 1954	Converted to trolley bus
Lake Street	Lake & Austin	Lake & Dearborn	May 30, 1954	Thru route 16
Laramie Avenue	Lake & Laramie	Harrison & Laramie	1937	
Lawrence Avenue	Austin & Lawrence	Broadway & Lawrence	April 1, 1951	Converted to trolley bus
Lincoln-Bowmanville	Lincoln & Peterson	Dearborn & Polk	February 18, 1951	
Lincoln-Rosehill	Ravenswood & Rosehill	Dearborn & Polk	August 1, 1948	
Lincoln-Indiana	Lincoln & Peterson	51st & Indiana	March 11, 1951	Through Route 3
Madison Street	Madison & Austin	Dearborn & Washington	December 13, 1953	Through Route 20
Madison-Fifth Avenue	Pulaski & Fifth Avenue	Dearborn & Washington	February 22, 1954	
Milwaukee Avenue	Milwaukee & Imlay	Monroe & Dearborn	May 11, 1952	
Montrose Avenue	Milwaukee & Montrose	Broadway & Montrose	July 29, 1946	
Morgan-Racine-Sangamon	Erie & Ashland	39th & Morgan	July 25, 1948	Through Route 23
Noble Street	North & Ashland	Milwaukee & Noble	March 5, 1932	
North Avenue	North & Narragansett	North & Clark	December 4, 1949	Converted to trolley bus
Ogden Avenue	25th & Laramie	Lake & Dearborn	September 16, 1951	
Ogden-Clark	Clark & Drummond	Ogden & Kenton	September 14, 1924	Through Route 11
Pershing Road-East	Root & Halsted	Cottage Grove & Pershing	February 15, 1948	
Pershing Road Extension	35th & Cottage Grove	Western & Pershing	August 28, 1945	
Pulaski Road	Pulaski & Bryn Mawr	31st & Pulaski	September 16, 1951	Converted to trolley bus
Riverdale	119th & Michigan	138th & Leyden	September 9, 1946	
Riverview-Larrabee	Roscoe & Western	Polk & Dearborn	January 10, 1949	
Roosevelt Road	Museum Loop	Roosevelt & Austin	April 12, 1953	Converted to trolley bus
12th-Ogden-Wells	Clark & Drummond	Roosevelt & Cicero	September 14, 1924	Through Route 14
South Chicago-Ewing	63rd & South Park	118th & Burley	June 30, 1947	
South Deering	63rd & Dorchester	112th & Torrence	April 25, 1948	
Southport	Clark & Southport	Polk & Dearborn	September 14, 1924	
State Street	Wells & Division	119th & Morgan	December 5, 1955	
State-Madison	Madison & Austin	39th & State	September 14, 1924	Through Route 7
State-Milwaukee	Milwaukee & Edmunds	63rd & State	September 14, 1924	Through Route 6
Stony Island Avenue	Navy Pier	93rd & Stony Island	June 29, 1951	
Taylor-Sedgwick-Sheffield	Taylor & Western	Clark & Sheffield	September 1, 1947	
Van Buren Street	Adams & Dearborn	Kedzie & Van Buren	August 12, 1951	
Wallace-Racine	State & Lake	87th & Racine	July 27, 1951	
Webster-Racine	Fullerton & Racine	Lincoln & Webster	September 1, 1947	
Wentworth Avenue	Clark & Illinois	81st & Halsted	June 21, 1958	Last streetcar route to be abandoned
Western Avenue	Western & Berwyn	79th & Western	June 17, 1956	Through Route 10
Whiting-East Chicago	63rd & Vernon	Indianapolis & State Line	June 9, 1940	Thru service to Hammond, Ind. via HW&EC
Windsor Park	63rd & Dorchester	93rd & Baltimore	April 25, 1948	
14th-16th Street	16th & Kenton	Roosevelt & Michigan	July 25, 1948	
18th Street	Blue Island & Leavitt	18th & State	July 25, 1948	
26th Street	26th & Halsted	26th & Cottage Grove	February 29, 1948	
31st Street	Pitney Court & Archer	31st & Lake Park	February 29, 1948	
35th Street	36th & Kedzie	35th & Cottage Grove	April 15, 1951	
43rd-Root Street	Root & Halsted	43rd & Oakenwald	August 9, 1953	
47th Street	47th & Kedzie	47th & Lake Shore Dr	April 15, 1951	Converted to trolley bus
51st-55th Street	51st & St. Louis	56th & Lake Park	May 30, 1948	Converted to trolley bus
59th-61st Street	59th & Central Park	60th & Blackstone	June 1, 1948	
63rd Street	63rd Place & Narragansett	64th & Stony Island	May 24, 1953	
67th-69th-71st Street	71st & California	67th & Oglesby	May 24, 1953	
71st Street	73rd & Vincennes	71st & Cottage Grove	May 22, 1947	
74th-75th Street	74th & Ashland	75th & Lakefront	October 28, 1946	
79th Street	79th & Western	79th & Brandon	September 16, 1951	
87th Street	87th & Vincennes	87th & Commercial	May 27, 1951	
93rd-95th Street	95th & State	89th & Avenue O	May 27, 1951	
103rd Street	103rd & Vincennes	103rd & Cottage Grove	October 13, 1941	
106th Street	106th & Torrence	106th & Indianapolis	August 13, 1941	
111th Street	111th & Vincennes	111th & Cottage Grove	September 23, 1945	
115th Street	115th & Halsted	115th & South Park	September 23, 1945	
119th Street	119th & Vincennes	119th & Morgan	February 3, 1946	

== Remnants ==
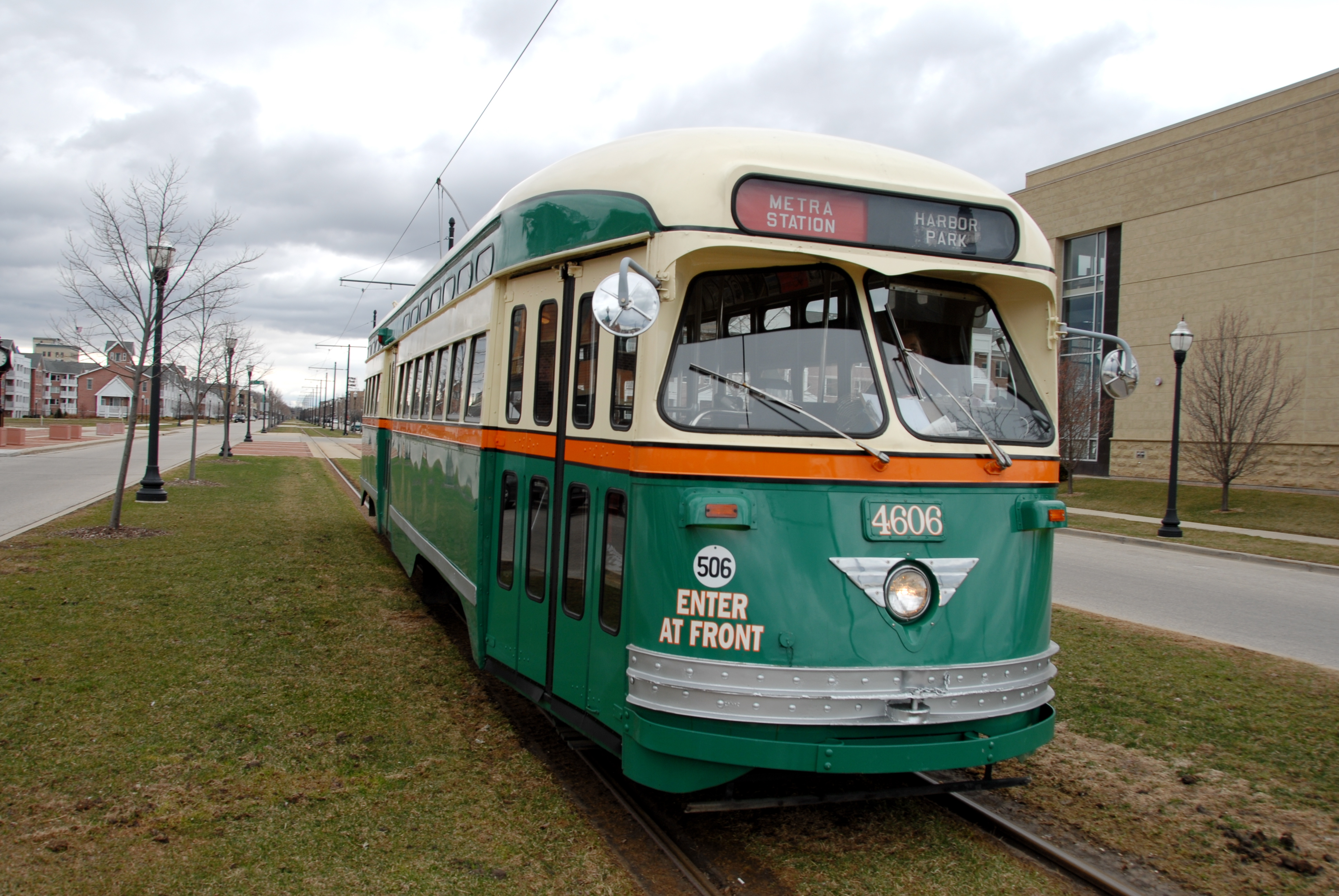
Kenosha #4606 in "Green Hornet" livery.

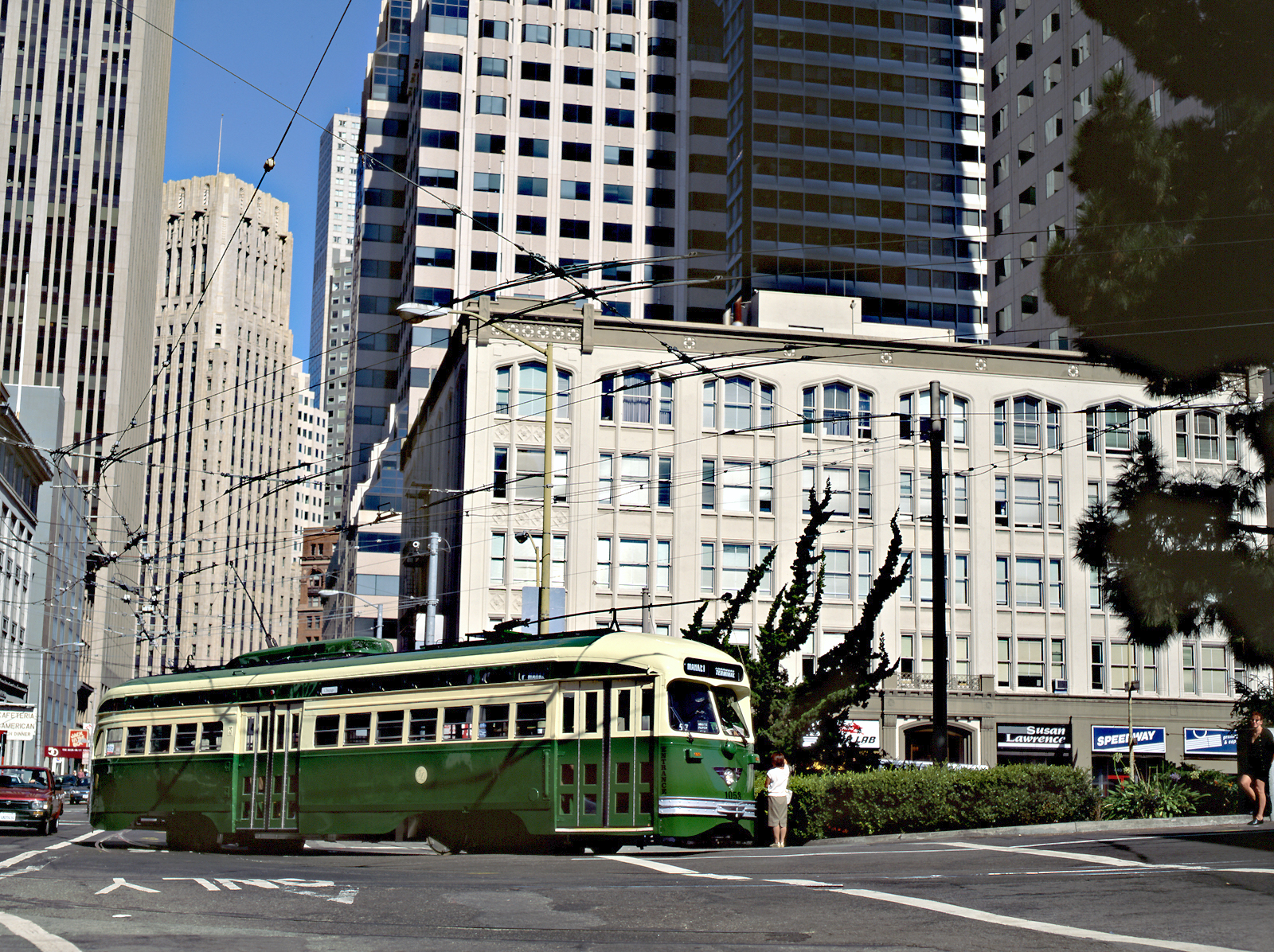
Ex-Philadelphia #1058 like heritage streetcar in San Francisco with Chicago Transit Authority's 1950s green and cream livery.

The primary remnants of the CSL system are the 77th Street & Vincennes car barns, the Ardmore temporary bus garage, and buildings that were electricity substations. Cable-car survivors include powerhouses at LaSalle and Illinois (NCSR), Washington and Jefferson (WCSR), a small barn on Blue Island east of Western (WCSR), and other structures on Armitage west of Campbell, and Lake Park south of 55th street. Burnside car barn at 93rd & Drexel is still basically intact. Some cars of CSL and its predecessors are preserved at the Illinois Railway Museum and other museums. Stand-in for CSL PCC "Green Hornet" streetcars (actually streetcars from other cities repainted in CSL colors) operate over the Kenosha Electric Railway in Kenosha, Wisconsin and the F-Market Line in San Francisco, California. CSL Motor Bus 3407 is preserved at the Illinois Railway Museum. A few CTA bus routes (notably 4 Cottage Grove, 8 Halsted, 9 Ashland, 20 Madison, 22 Clark, and 36 Broadway) still have their original CSL Through Route numbers. One can find rails from the old system around the city, although they have been significantly cemented and often only the tops of the rails can be seen.
