= Philosophical Institute of Victoria =

The Philosophical Institute of Victoria was a scientific institute which functioned in Victoria, Australia during 19th century. It was founded in 1854 through the amalgamation of the Victorian Institute for the Advancement of Science and the Philosophical Society of Victoria. The first meeting of the newly amalgamated group was held on 10 July 1855 at the Museum of Natural History, chaired by a representative of the Victorian Institute, Dr J. Maund. According to the amalgamation statement, 'the objects of the Philosophical Institute shall be the same as that of the Philosophical Society, and that the mode of operation of the new Institute shall be the same as that of the old Society'. The inaugural president was the Victorian Surveyor General Captain Andrew Clark.

Papers read at the first meeting included:

- 'On the physical character of the County of Heytesbury'. By Robert Scott.
- 'On the favourable geological and chemical nature of the principal rocks and soils of Victoria, in reference to the production of ordinary cereals and wine.' By Clement Hodgkinson.
- A meteorological table of the climatology for June of that year was also presented, while large numbers of natural history specimens, some new to science, were also exhibited.

In 1857 the Philosophical Institute formed an Exploration Committee with the aim of investigating the practicability of fitting out an exploring expedition.

A number of prominent Victorian scientists and engineers including Redmond Barry, Clement Hodgkinson and Ferdinand von Mueller.

The Institute became the Royal Society of Victoria after receiving a Royal Charter in 1859.

== Office bearers ==
Year	President	Vice President(s)	Treasurer	Honorary Secretary
1855	The Hon. Captain Andrew Clark, Surveyor-General	Godfrey Howitt, MD, FRBSE	Dr David E Wilkie, MD.	Robert Brough Smyth Esq, FGS. / W Wekey.
1856	The Hon. Captain Andrew Clark	Maj. Norman Campbell; Clement Hodgkinson; Godfrey Howitt	Dr David E Wilkie, MD.	Robert Brough Smyth Esq, FGS. / W Wekey.
1857	The Hon. Captain Andrew Clark	Professor W P Wilson & Dr David E Wilkie.	Professor M H Irving, MA.	Dr John Macadam, MD. / Robert Brough Smyth Esq, FGS
1858	Sir William Stawell, Chief Justice	Dr Ferdinand Mueller & Clement Hodgkinson, CE.	Professor M H Irving, MA.	John Macadam, MD.
1859	Sir William Stawell	Dr Ferdinand Mueller & Clement Hodgkinson, CE.	Professor M H Irving, MA.	Dr John Macadam, MD.

== See also ==
- Surveyor General of Victoria
