= Bolinda =

- Town
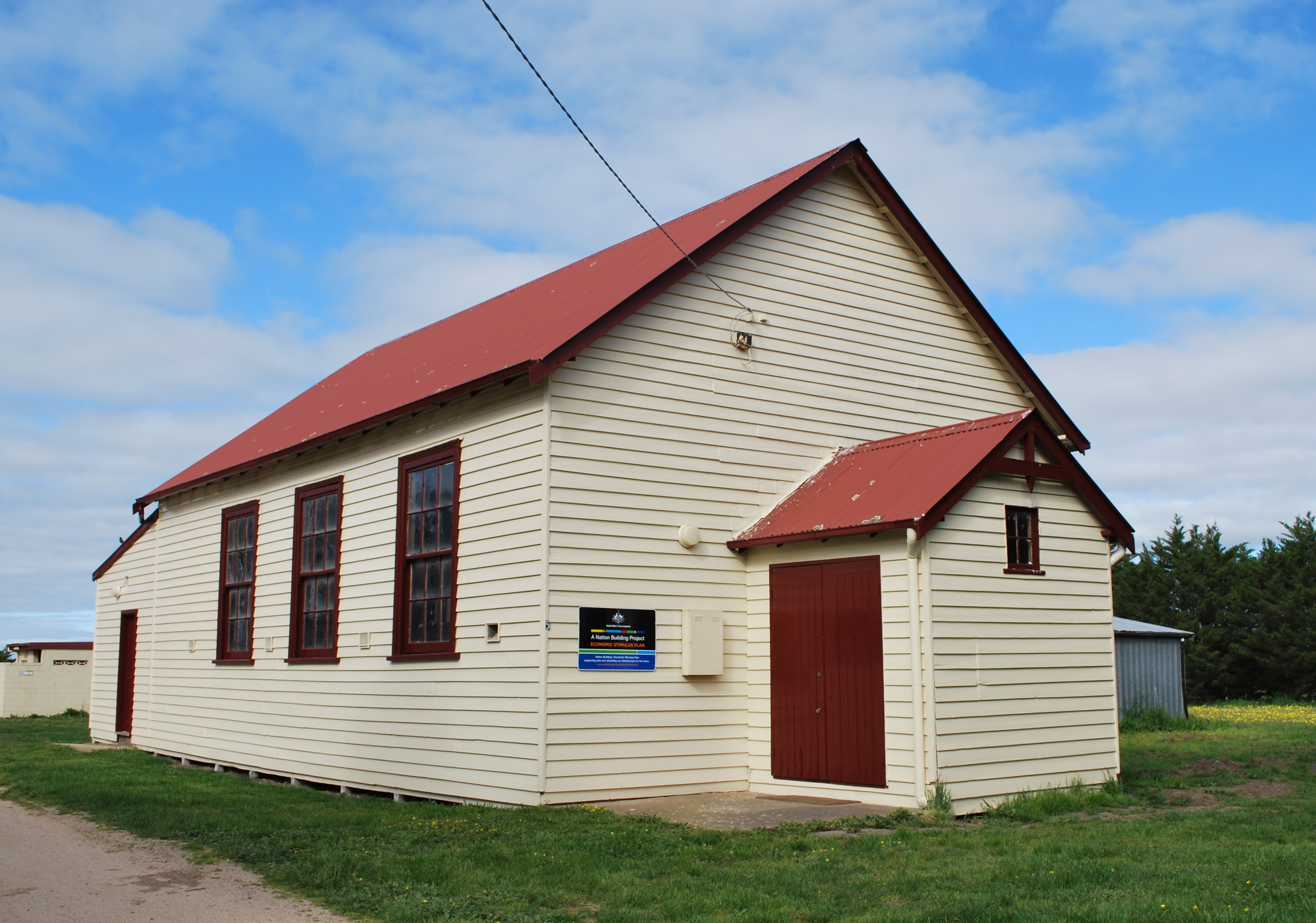
- The Bolinda community hall

- Coordinates: 37°26′S 144°45′E
- Country: Australia
- State: Victoria
- LGA: Shire of Macedon Ranges
- Location: 52 km (32 mi) from Melbourne; 20 km (12 mi) N of Sunbury

Government
  - State electorate: Macedon
  - Federal division: McEwen
- Elevation: 385 m (1,263 ft)

Population
  - Total: 185 (SAL 2021)
- Postcode: 3432
Localities around Bolinda
Kerrie	Monegeetta	Springfield
Riddells Creek	Bolinda	Darraweit Guim
Riddells Creek	Clarkefield	Clarkefield

Bolinda /bəˈlɪndə/ is a locality north of Melbourne, Australia on the Melbourne-Lancefield Road. It is located 6 km south of Romsey, within the Shire of Macedon Ranges.

John Brock, one of the first British settlers in the Bolinda district, named his station Bullando Vale. However, it is not clear whether this is connected in any way to the present name. Rupert Clarke owned a property named Bolinda Vale, near Romsey which had been in his family, as squatters, from 1860 or earlier.

Bolinda Post Office opened on 12 June 1879 and closed in 1980.

The community today is centred on the primary school (established 1870), community hall and recreation reserve.

Bolinda was an intermediate stopping point on the Clarkefield-Lancefield railway which operated between 1881 and 1956.

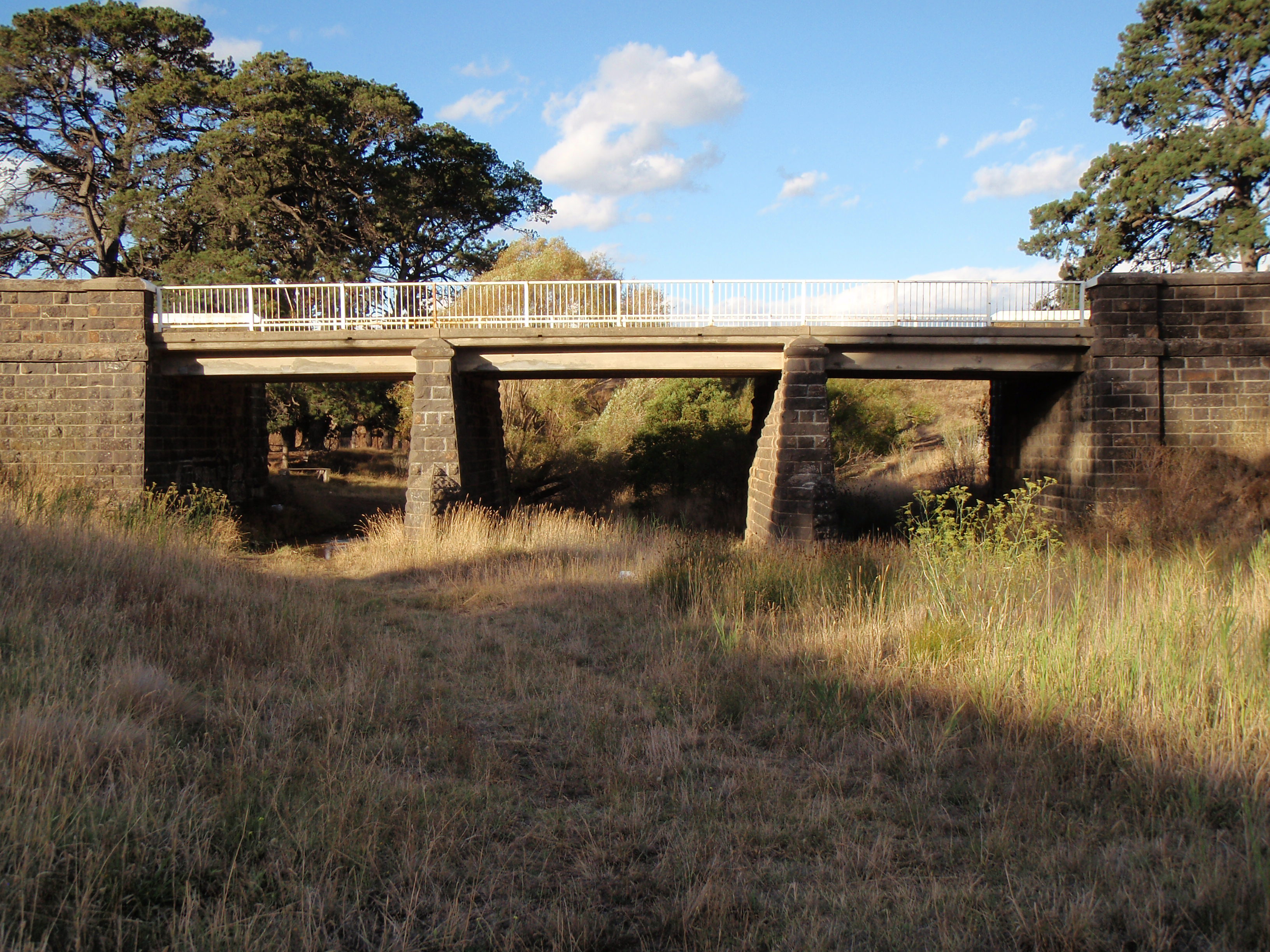
The Bolinda Bridge, between Bolinda and Clarkefield
