= Riddells Creek =

- Town
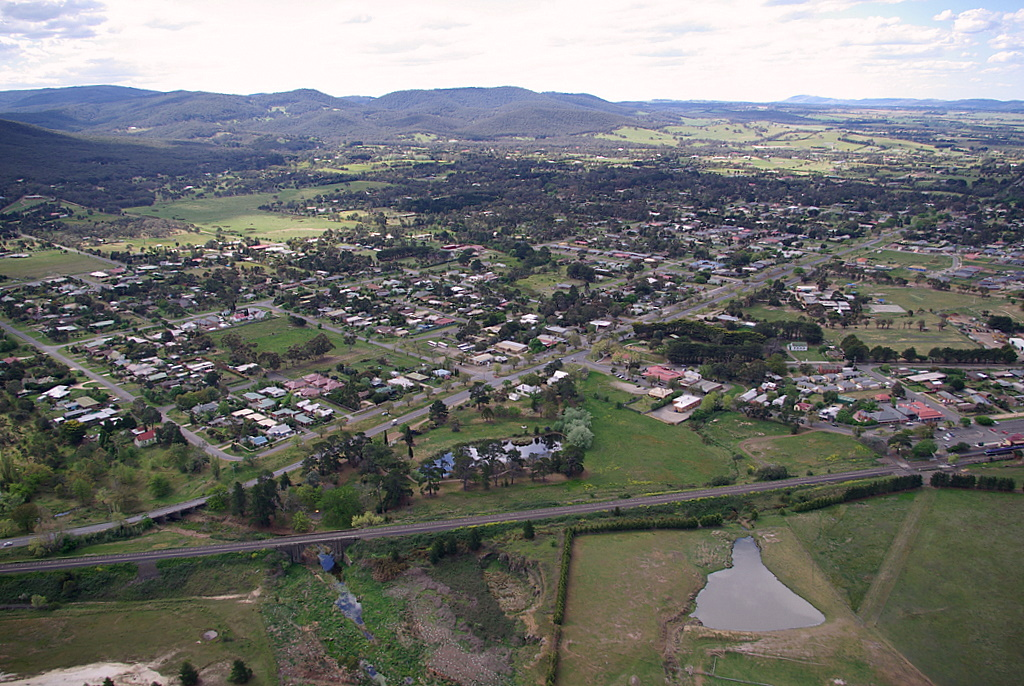
- Riddells Creek seen from the air

- Interactive map of Riddells Creek
- Coordinates: 37°28′S 144°41′E
- Country: Australia
- State: Victoria
- LGA: Shire of Macedon Ranges
- Location: 29 km (18 mi) SE of Kyneton; 10 km (6.2 mi) NE of Gisborne; 57 km (35 mi) NW of Melbourne; 98 km (61 mi) SE of Bendigo

Government
  - State electorate: Macedon
  - Federal division: McEwen
- Elevation: 400 m (1,300 ft)

Population
  - Total: 3,574 (2021 census)
- Postcode: 3431
Localities around Riddells Creek
Woodend; Mount Macedon; Macedon	Hesket Cherokee; Kerrie	Lancefield Romsey Monegeetta
Macedon; New Gisborne; Gisborne	Riddells Creek	Monegeetta Bolinda
Gisborne Gisborne South	Sunbury	Bolinda; Clarkefield

Riddells Creek /ˈrɪdəlz ˈkriːk/ is a town in Victoria, Australia, located in Wurundjeri Country and the Shire of Macedon Ranges. It is located in between the cities of Bendigo and Melbourne. Riddells Creek is also the name of the main watercourse which flows through the township, and which is a tributary of Jacksons Creek to the south. The town is served by Riddells Creek railway station on the Bendigo line. At the 2021 census, Riddells Creek had a population of 3574.

== History ==
Riddells Creek falls in the traditional lands of the Wurundjeri people of the Kulin nation. Post colonial settlement, it was founded by John Carre Riddell and Thomas Ferrier Hamilton in 1841, when they purchased around 640 acres (260 ha) of land and leased another 2,000 acres (810 ha). The dirt road running parallel and opposite to the train station, Hamilton Street, was home to Mr John Carre Riddell whose house now demolished was also the oldest house in Riddells Creek to date. Hamilton Street and the Road between New Gisborne and Riddells Creek is named Hamilton Road after Thomas Hamilton.

Riddells Creek Post Office opened on 1 February 1859.

== Environment and facilities ==
Riddells Creek is on the southern foothills of the Macedon Ranges. Riddells Creek is home to two historic railway bridges and is surrounded by natural bushland. There is also a small creek that runs through the town at Wybejong Park.

Riddells Creek Primary School provides education for children in the area. Sporting and clubs in Riddells Creek include Riddells Creek Tennis Club, a Pony Club, Riddells Junior Basketball Association, Riddell Football Club, Cricket Club and Dog Obedience Club. There is also a Living and Learning Centre, the Riddells Creek Winery and Riddells Creek Landcare.

Riddells Creek is home to the Dromkeen Museum, a nineteenth century homestead classified by the National Trust of Australia that is home to the Australian Children's Literature Collection. It also provides educational displays and programs relating to Australian children's literature.

To the east of Riddells Creek, adjacent to the Mount Charlie State Forest, the 74-hectare (180-acre) Rowallan Recreation and Adventure Camp is owned by the Scouts and Guides of Essendon Area. It is named after Lord Rowallan and opened in 1950.

Riddells Creek also has a railway station served by trains on the Bendigo Line. Express services do not stop at Riddells Creek.

=== Airfield ===
Riddell Airfield
- IATA: none; ICAO: YRID

Summary
- Airport type: Private
- Owner/Operator: Riddell Airfield Pty Ltd
- Serves: Riddells Creek
- Location: Riddells Creek
- Elevation AMSL: 1,150 ft (350 m)
- Coordinates: 35°28′48″S 144°43′6″E

Map
- Location in Victoria

Runways
Direction	Length		Surface
Direction	m	ft	Surface
02/20	880	2,887	Asphalt
06/24	400	1,312	Grass
15/33	440	1,444	Grass
- Sources: Australian AIP

Riddell Airfield (ICAO: YRID) is a small private airfield located 4 km (2.5 mi) east of Riddells Creek.

== Gallery ==
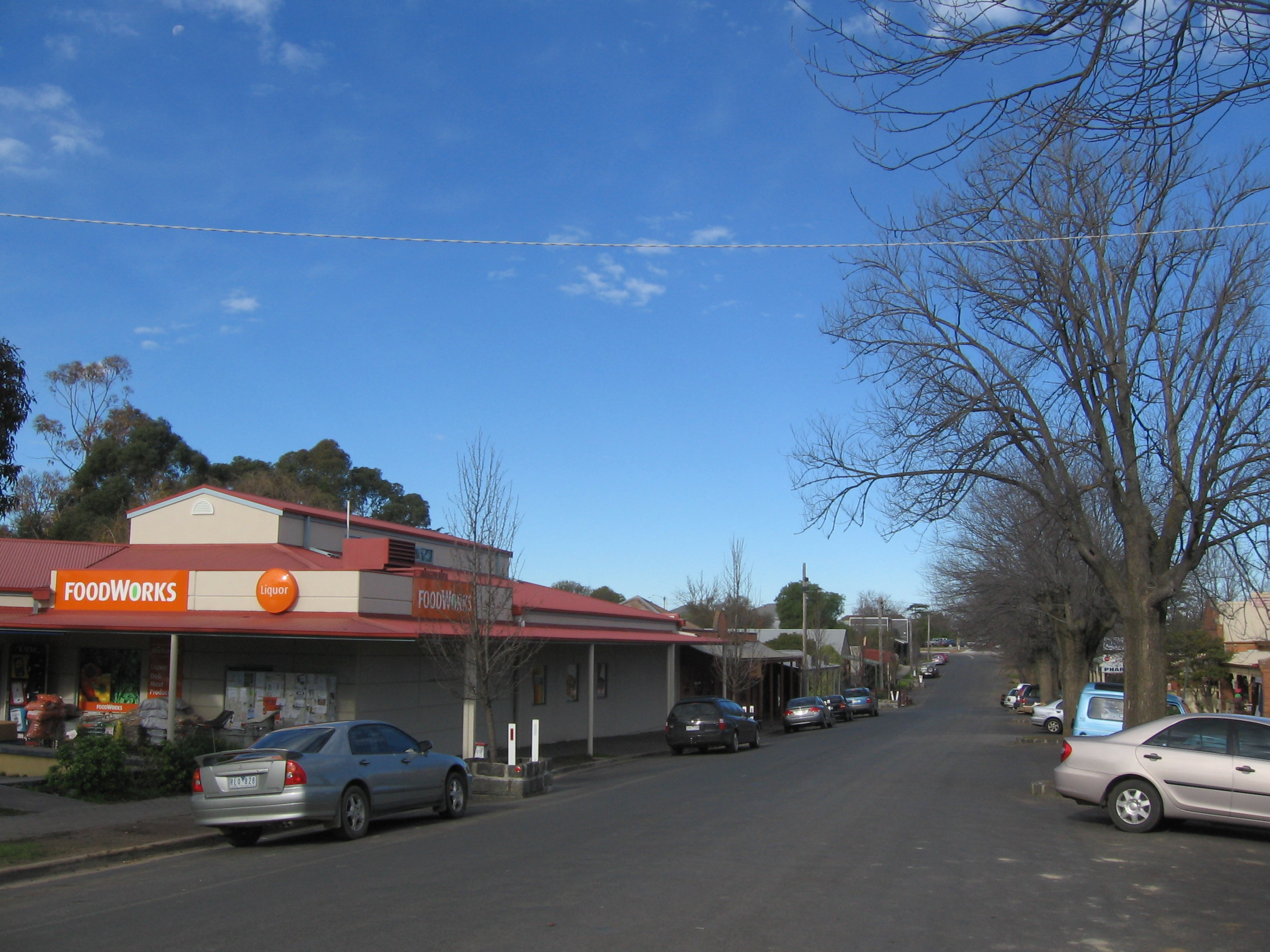
Station street

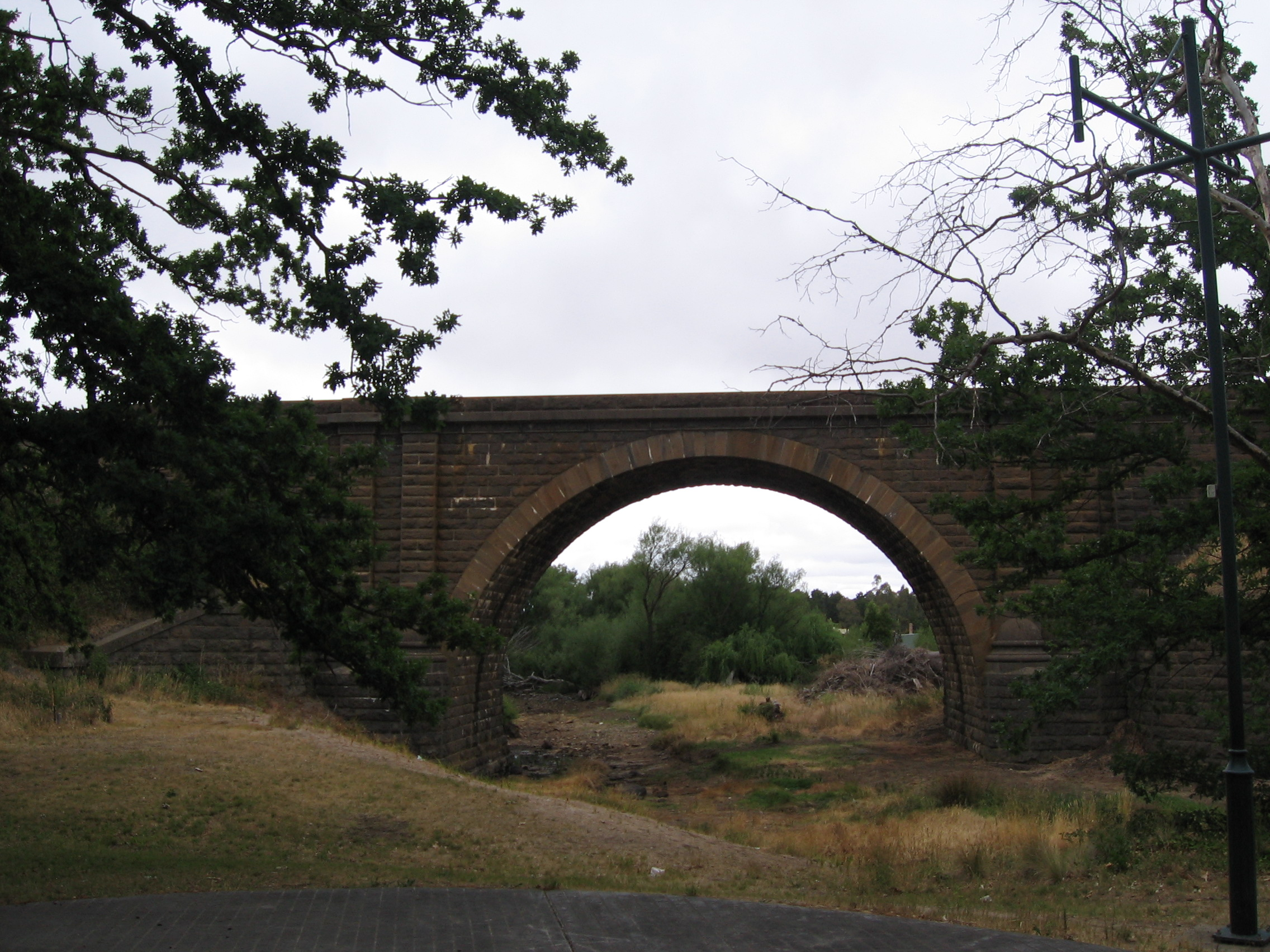
Historic Railway Bridge

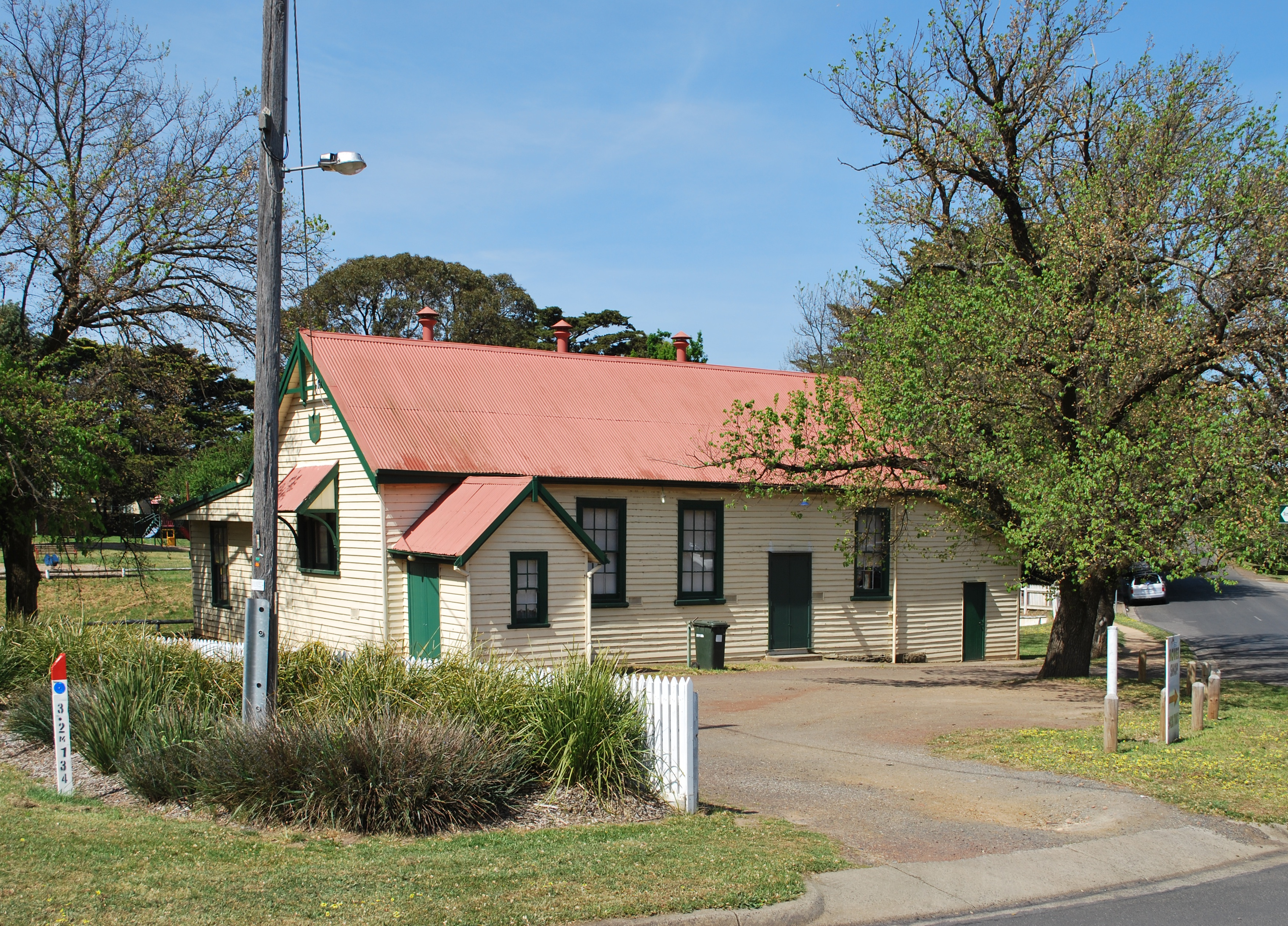
The Mechanics Institute
