= Kerrie, Victoria =

Kerrie Victoria
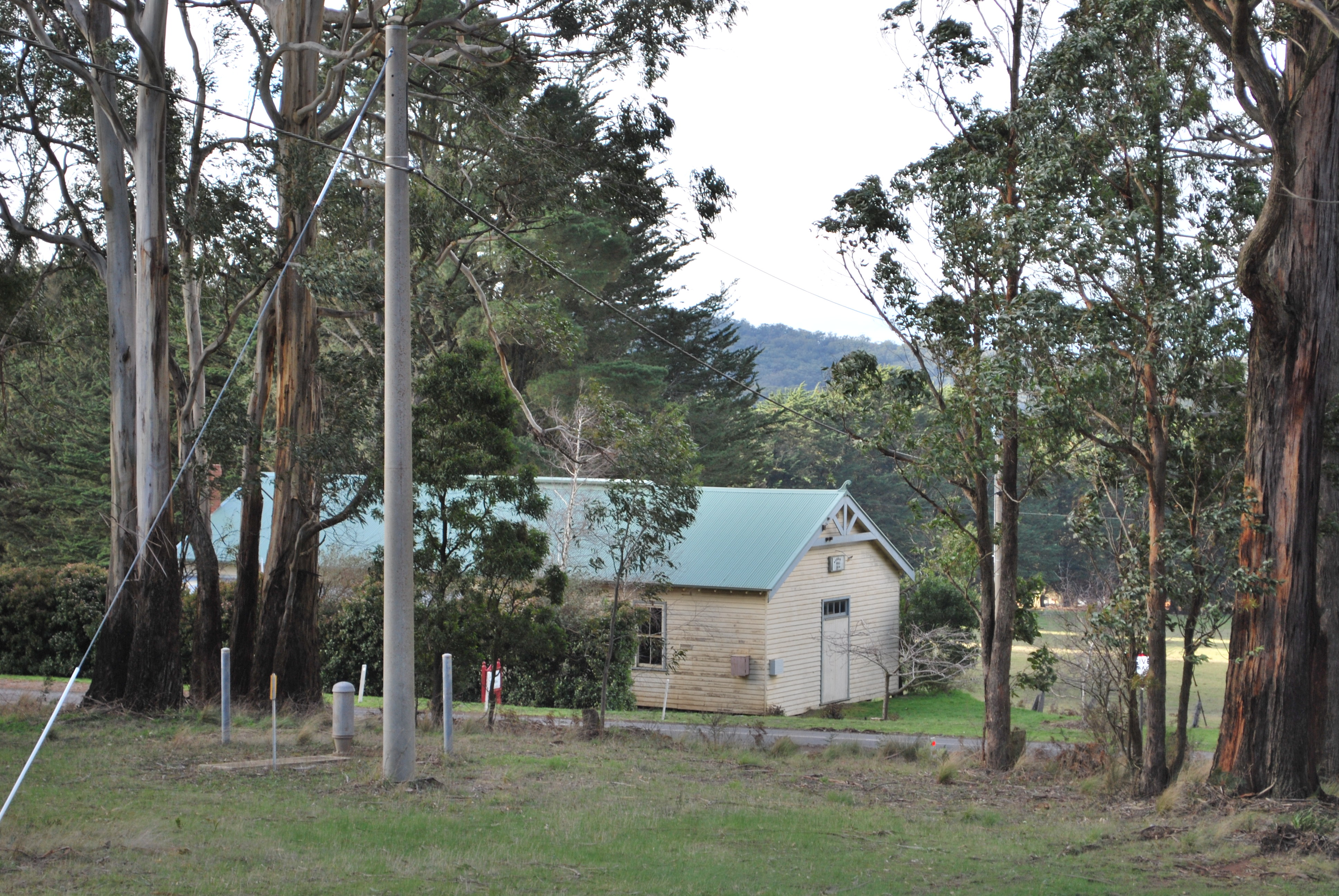
- Kerrie Public Hall

- Coordinates: 37°23′S 144°42′E
- Population: 124 (?)
- Postcode(s): 3434
- Elevation: 630 m (2,067 ft)
- Location: 76 km (47 mi) NW of Melbourne; 18 km (11 mi) SE of Kyneton; 28 km (17 mi) W of Lancefield; 22 km (14 mi) E of Woodend
- LGA(s): Shire of Macedon Ranges
- State electorate(s): Macedon
- Federal division(s): McEwen
Localities around Kerrie:
Hesket	Rochford	Romsey
Cherokee	Kerrie	Romsey
Riddells Creek	Riddells Creek	Monegeetta

Kerrie /ˈkɛri/ is a locality in the Macedon Ranges region of Victoria, Australia, featuring a town hall (1934) and the closed Kerrie State School (c. 1877). The school was closed in 1991, but was an important venue for community meetings and events until it was damaged by fire on 16 October 2021. The buildings and grounds are heritage listed and underwent external restoration during 2009–2010. Nearby is the Hall, and the former tennis courts, which are now overgrown and in a state of disrepair.

The Kerrie Valley is the source of domestic water for the nearby town of Romsey. The catchment reservoir consists of a dam on a tributary of the Bolinda Creek.

Kerrie Post Office opened on 10 July 1891 and closed in 1949.
