= Lancefield railway line =

Former railway line in Victoria, Australia

Lancefield

Overview
- Status: Now operating as the Old Railway Station B & B and Carriage Cafe.
- Former connections: Joined Bendigo mainline at Clarkefield, and Heathcote line (now closed) at Kilmore.
- Stations: 13

Service
- Type: V/Line passenger service

History
- Opened: 6 June 1881 to Lancefield, extended to Kilmore 6 April 1892.
- Completed: 1892 to Kilmore.
- Closed: 1 June 1897 beyond Lancefield, remainder closed 13 August 1956

Technical
- Number of tracks: Single

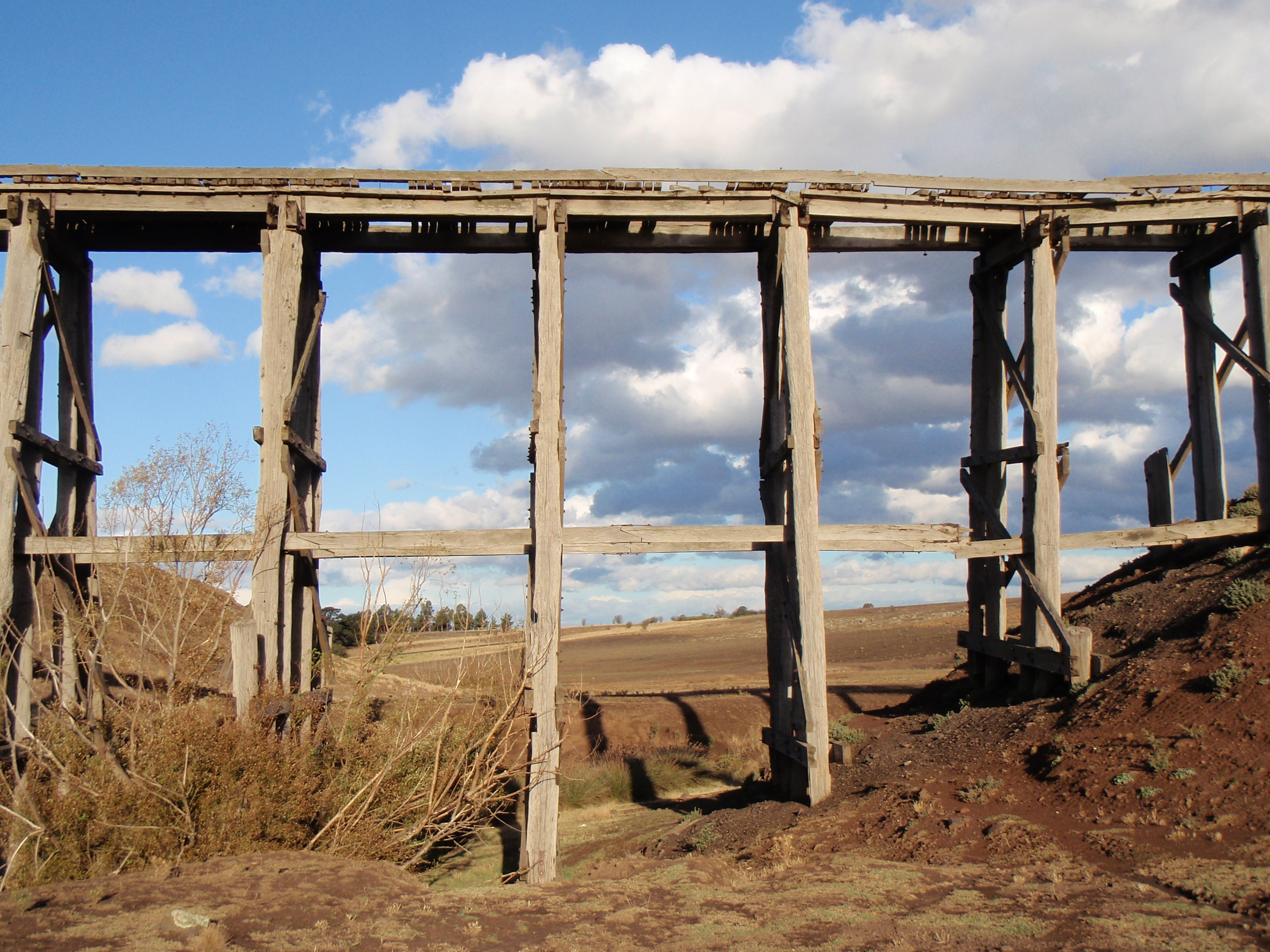
The old trestle bridge on the former railway near Clarkefield

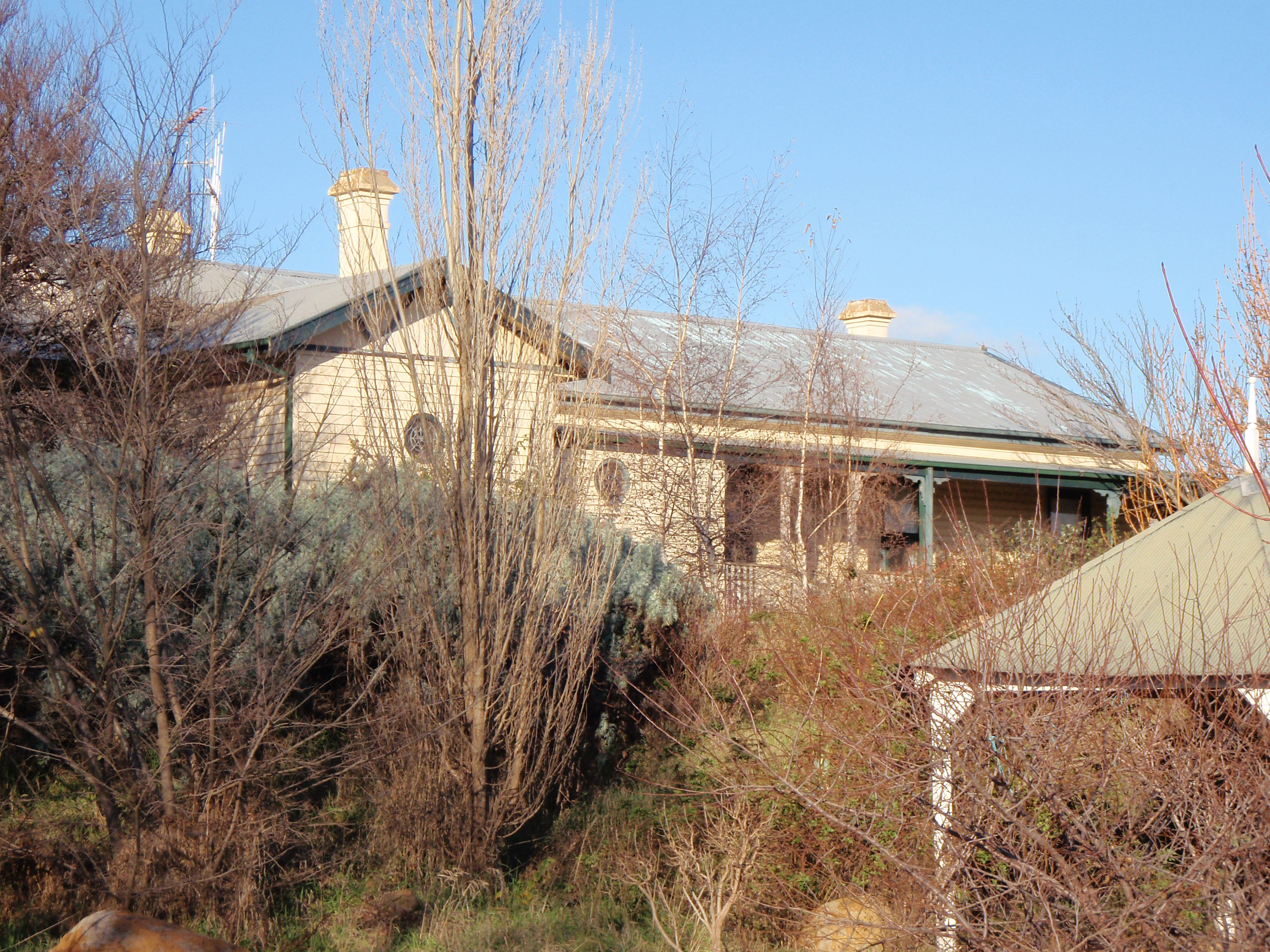
The former Lancefield railway station

The Lancefield railway line, or the Clarkefield and Lancefield Railway, was a former broad gauge railway in central Victoria, connecting Clarkefield railway station on the Bendigo line to Kilmore railway station on the Heathcote line, via Lancefield. However, the ill-fated Lancefield-Kilmore section operated only briefly in the 1890s so, for much of its history, the line existed simply as a branch line, with its terminus at Lancefield station.

== History ==
=== Clarkefield-Lancefield section ===
The branch line off the Melbourne-Bendigo line originated at Clarkefield, then known as Lancefield Junction, and ran to Bolinda, Monegeetta, North Monegeetta, Romsey and Lancefield, and was opened on 6 June 1881.

The Lancefield-Clarkefield section of the branch was closed on 13 August 1956, when the wooden trestle bridge near Clarkefield required extensive maintenance and repairs. Though the railway right of way no longer exists, the former track bed can still be seen in many places, most notably the embankments and cuttings leading onto the decaying trestle bridge, which are visible from the road-side at the Bolinda bridge. The old Lancefield railway station fell into a state of disrepair after its closure but has since been refurbished as the Old Railway Station B & B and Carriage Cafe.

The station building and goods shed from Monegeeta were relocated to a farming property just north of Romsey, on Lancefield Road, where they remain today as farm outbuildings. None of the other stations remain intact. The sites of Bolinda and North Monegeeta stations and, to a lesser extent, those of Monegeeta and Romsey, are still identifiable.

=== Lancefield-Kilmore section ===
On 6 April 1892, the line was extended from Lancefield across the Great Dividing Range to Kilmore. This was one of the most infamous white elephants among the many late-nineteenth century Victorian rail projects, on a par with the Outer Circle railway line in suburban Melbourne.

Due to the steepness of the topography, not only was the Lancefield-Kilmore railway meandering and expensive to construct, it also ran through almost uninhabited country and, with little or no passenger custom or freight demand. The line was so unsuccessful that it was closed on 1 June 1897, although the tracks were not torn up until 1917. Some of the old right of way is visible around the Lancefield Gap and on the approach to Kilmore.

For such a relatively short section of railway, the line had a significant number of stations or, at least, named stopping places. From Lancefield to Kilmore, stopping places included Mount William, Goldie, Springfield, High Park and Forbes
