= Cherokee, Victoria =

Cherokee Victoria
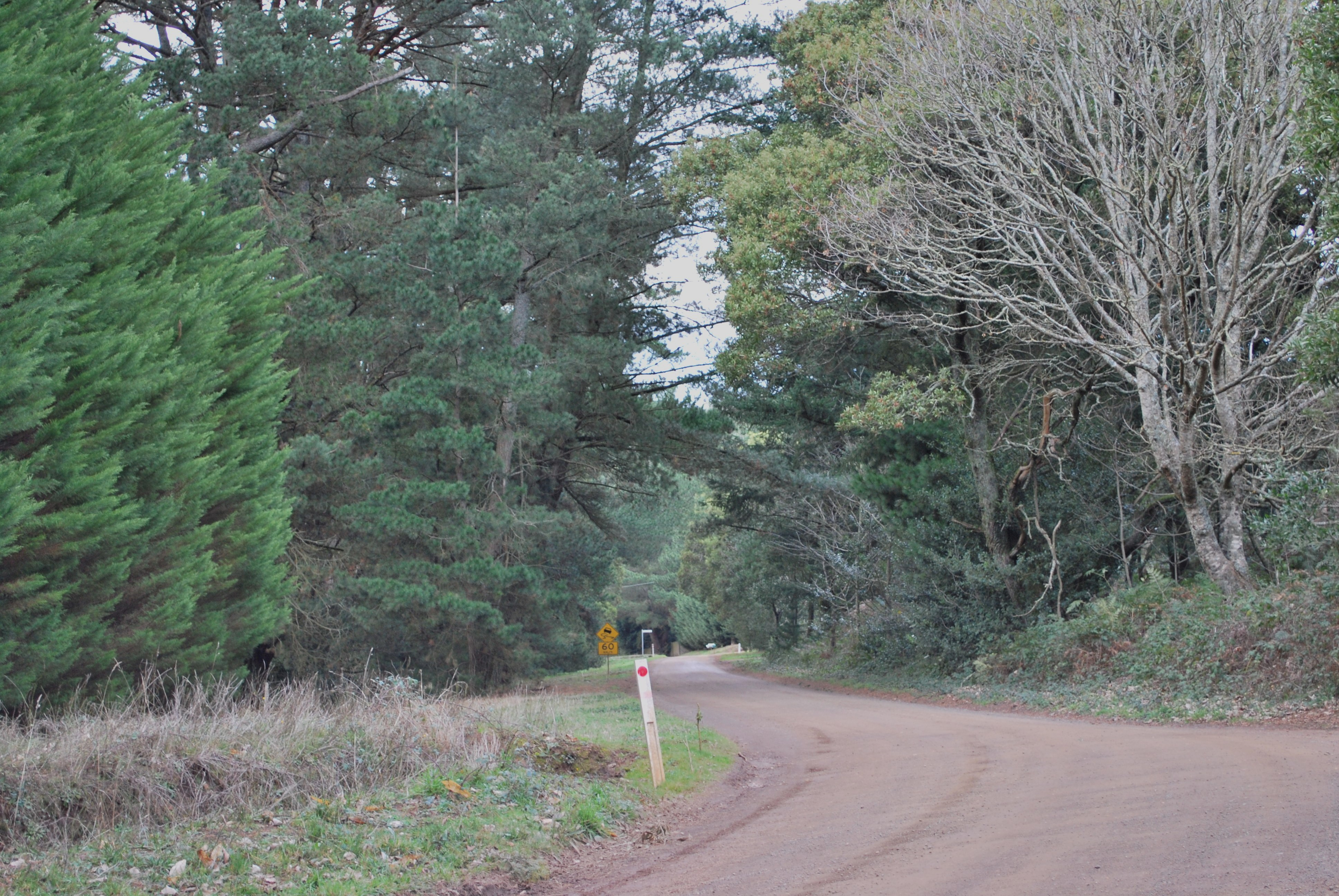
- Gap Road at Cherokee

- Coordinates: 37°23′S 144°38′E
- Population: 68 (SAL 2021)
- Established: 1880
- Postcode(s): 3434
- Elevation: 730 m (2,395 ft)
- LGA(s): Shire of Macedon Ranges
- State electorate(s): Macedon
- Federal division(s): McEwen
Localities around Cherokee:
Hesket	Hesket	Kerrie
Mount Macedon	Cherokee	Kerrie
Barringo	Riddells Creek	Riddells Creek

Cherokee /ˈtʃɛrəki/ is a locality situated in the Macedon Ranges Shire, in Victoria, Australia 73 kilometres (45 mi) north of the state capital, Melbourne.

The settlement as it appears today was created by land subdivision around 1880–1881, although the area was occupied by Europeans before this date. Timber mills and a school were operating by 1865, possibly earlier, in response to the demand for timber created by the Victorian gold rush.

Cherokee Post Office opened on 1 July 1927 and closed in 1955.
