= Springfield, Victoria (Macedon Ranges) =

Springfield Victoria
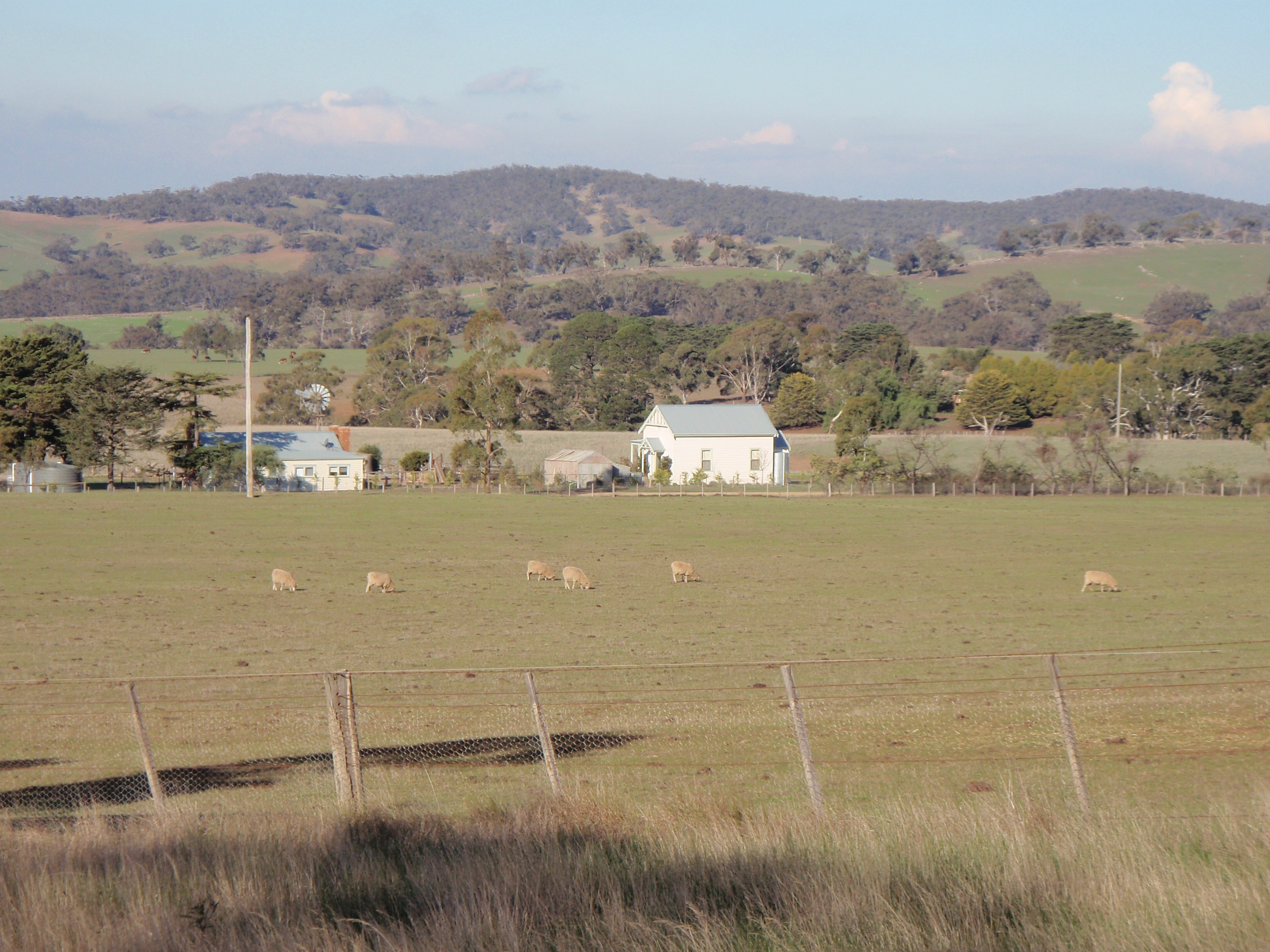

- Coordinates: 37°21′S 144°45′E
- Population: 193 (SAL 2021)
- Established: 1860s
- Postcode(s): 3434
- Elevation: 490 m (1,608 ft)
- LGA(s): Shire of Macedon Ranges
- State electorate(s): Macedon
- Federal division(s): McEwen
Localities around Springfield:
Lancefield	Mount William	Kilmore
Romsey	Springfield	Bylands
Monegeetta	Chintin	Darraweit Guim

Springfield is a locality in the Shire of Macedon Ranges local government area in central Victoria, Australia approximately 65 kilometres north of the state capital, Melbourne. It is within the catchment area of Deep Creek, a tributary of the Maribyrnong River.

== History ==
In 1838, the Springfield pastoral run was taken up by James Fulton. This property actually lay to the west of Deep Creek, whereas present day Springfield is located on the eastern side of the creek.

Along with the Shire of Lancefield, the historic Shire of Springfield was merged into the existing Shire of Romsey on 31 May 1916. More recently, in 1995, further amalgamations merged Romsey Shire and others to form the present Macedon Ranges Shire. While it was once the centre of its own local government area, Springfield now lies on the extreme eastern edge of the shire, with Kyneton, the administrative centre, almost 40 km away by road.

Springfield was a stopping point on the ill-fated Lancefield-Kilmore railway, which operated briefly during the 1890s.

Although at one point the small settlement had its own Post Office and State School, today the Springfield area consists mostly of scattered farmhouses and cattle and sheep grazing properties. There is also a CFA firestation in Springfield.

== See also ==
Shire of Romsey
