= Romsey Examiner =

Former newspaper in Victoria, Australia

As a newspaper, the Romsey Examiner served the small rural village of Romsey which is set in the Mount Macedon, Victoria. The town is 65 kilometres north west of Melbourne, Australia, and about 15 km south of Lancefield.

Surrounded on three sides by the Great Dividing Range, the town of Five Mile Creek was officially recognised in 1858, but only six weeks later it was renamed Romsey. Reasons for the change are unclear.

By the mid-19th century, the traffic between Melbourne and the Bendigo goldfields spurred a development boom for Romsey as a town. Along with the Romsey Examiner the district was also served by Lancefield Examiner and Romsey Advocate.

== Archives ==
The microfilm archive of the newspaper held at the State Library of Victoria spans 4 Jan 1883 to 24 December 1920. The Kilmore Historical Society has an identical collection which has been housed at the Kilmore Library since its opening on 6 September 1996.
