= Sunbury Industrial School =

School in Victoria, Australia

Coordinates: 37.5963°S 144.7293°E

Information
- Established: 1864
- Closed: 1879
- Gender: Boys and Girls (educated separately)

The Sunbury Industrial School located on Jackson's Hill in Sunbury, Victoria, Australia, was a school developed to educate and house destitute children from 1864 until 1879.

A 1,000-acre (4.0 km^{2}) site was put aside in Sunbury following the implementation of the Neglected and Criminal Children's Act of 1864. Destitute or orphaned children were sent as wards of the state to learn a trade in the belief that this may then provide them with the skills necessary, once they were old enough, to provide and care for themselves. The school was co-educational, although girls and boys were segregated. Boys were expected to learn a trade while girls were expected to handle menial tasks such as washing clothes, cleaning floors and assisting with cooking.

The school consisted of ten large, unheated, bluestone buildings arranged in two rows of five. Located on the side of Jackson's Hill, they were called the Hill Wards. The open and exposed position of the buildings led to frequent illness and constant poor health of the children. The children were given rancid food, that they ate in their own rooms that by the time they received it, was cold. The children were given only a little water, no bedding, save for a blanket and many affected by Ophthalmia, went untreated, resulting in blindness. It was estimated that around 10 percent of children died within the first year of operation. This fact alone led to the school gaining the nickname of the Sunbury Slaughterhouse. Eventually, after public outcry, and after numerous Royal Commissions into the Industrial School System, by 1879 the Sunbury Industrial School was closed.

== Later uses of the site ==
The site was used as an asylum for the mentally ill from 1894 until around 1912, the patients were referred to as inmates. By 1914, at its peak, the Sunbury Lunatic Asylum housed 1000 patients. The asylum was renamed a psychiatric hospital and then a mental hospital. By the 1920s, the Health Reformation Act came in and improved conditions. By 1968 until 1992, the site was called the Caloola Training Centre for the Intellectually Disabled. Presently, the site is used by Victoria University.

== Sources ==
- Caloola Centre, Sunbury
