= Sunbury Downs College =

Location
- Sunbury, Victoria; Australia
- Coordinates: 37°34′58.7″S 144°42′18.9″E

Information
- Type: State school
- Motto: Confidence to Achieve
- Established: 1988
- Principal: Warwick Beynon
- Years: 7 to 12
- Enrollment: ≈656, Coeducation
- Colours: Red, navy, white, blue
- Nickname: SDC
- Yearbook: Nexus
- Publications: SDC News & eCommunications (online newsletters & communications)
- Website: http://www.sunburydowns.vic.edu.au

Sunbury Downs College is a secondary college located in the north-west regional town of Sunbury, Victoria, Australia.

The College is set on a single campus located within the northern Melbourne suburb of Sunbury and caters for students in Years 7–12.

== Accelerated curriculum and enrichment program ==
In 2008 an accelerated curriculum and enrichment program was introduced.

== Key details ==
- Type: government
- Level: secondary
- Gender: coed
- Religious affiliation: non-denominational
- Scholarships: yes
- Learning extension: yes
- International students: yes

== House system ==
Students are divided into one of four houses upon enrolling into the college. These houses compete every year in various events to win house points in the hope of winning the house cup, each year two carnivals are held for the houses to compete for. These are the athletics cup and the swimming cup. Each house is named after a notable person.

- Mitchell (blue)
- Aitkin (yellow)
- Jackson (green)
- Evans (red)

== Principals ==
From Term 4 2016 to 2019, the Sunbury Downs College principal was Maria Oddo. Since 2019, she has been working on a project for the Department of Education and has since had Warwick Beynon take over as acting principal.

Previous principals of the College were Brett Moore, Graeme Brown, Vin Virtue and John Shaw (founding principal).
