= Monegeetta =

Monegeetta Victoria
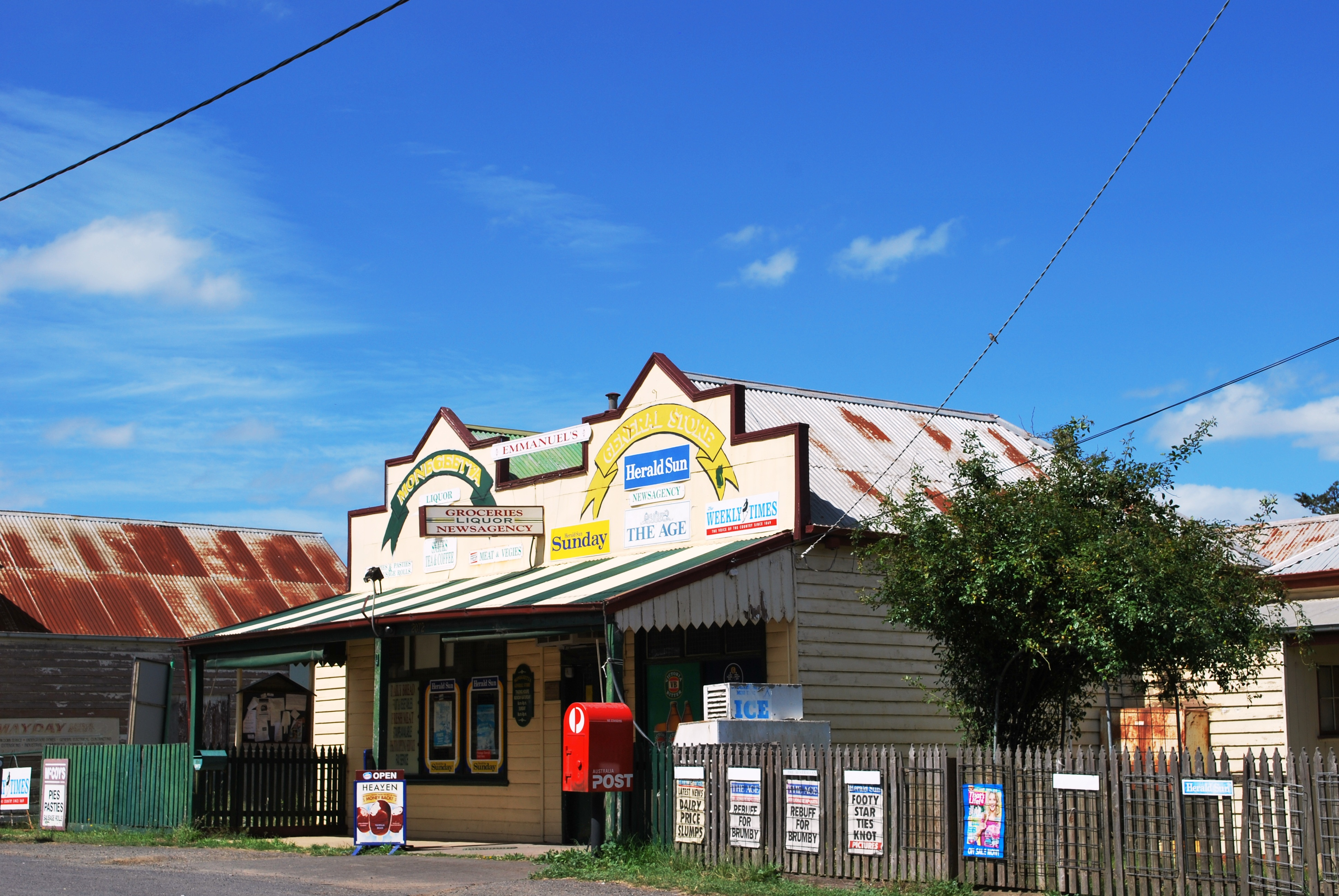
- General store, Monegeetta

- Coordinates: 37°25′S 144°45′E
- Population: 218 (2016 census)
- Postcode(s): 3433
- Elevation: 415 m (1,362 ft)
- Location: 54 km (34 mi) N of Melbourne; 24 km (15 mi) N of Sunbury
- LGA(s): Shire of Macedon Ranges
- State electorate(s): Macedon
- Federal division(s): McEwen
Localities around Monegeetta:
Kerrie	Romsey	Springfield
Kerrie	Monegeetta	Chintin
Riddells Creek	Bolinda	Chintin

Monegeetta /ˈmɒnəɡiːtə/ is a town north of Melbourne, Australia between the major towns of Sunbury and Romsey in fertile agricultural land east of the Macedon Ranges. Its local government area is the Shire of Macedon Ranges.

== History ==
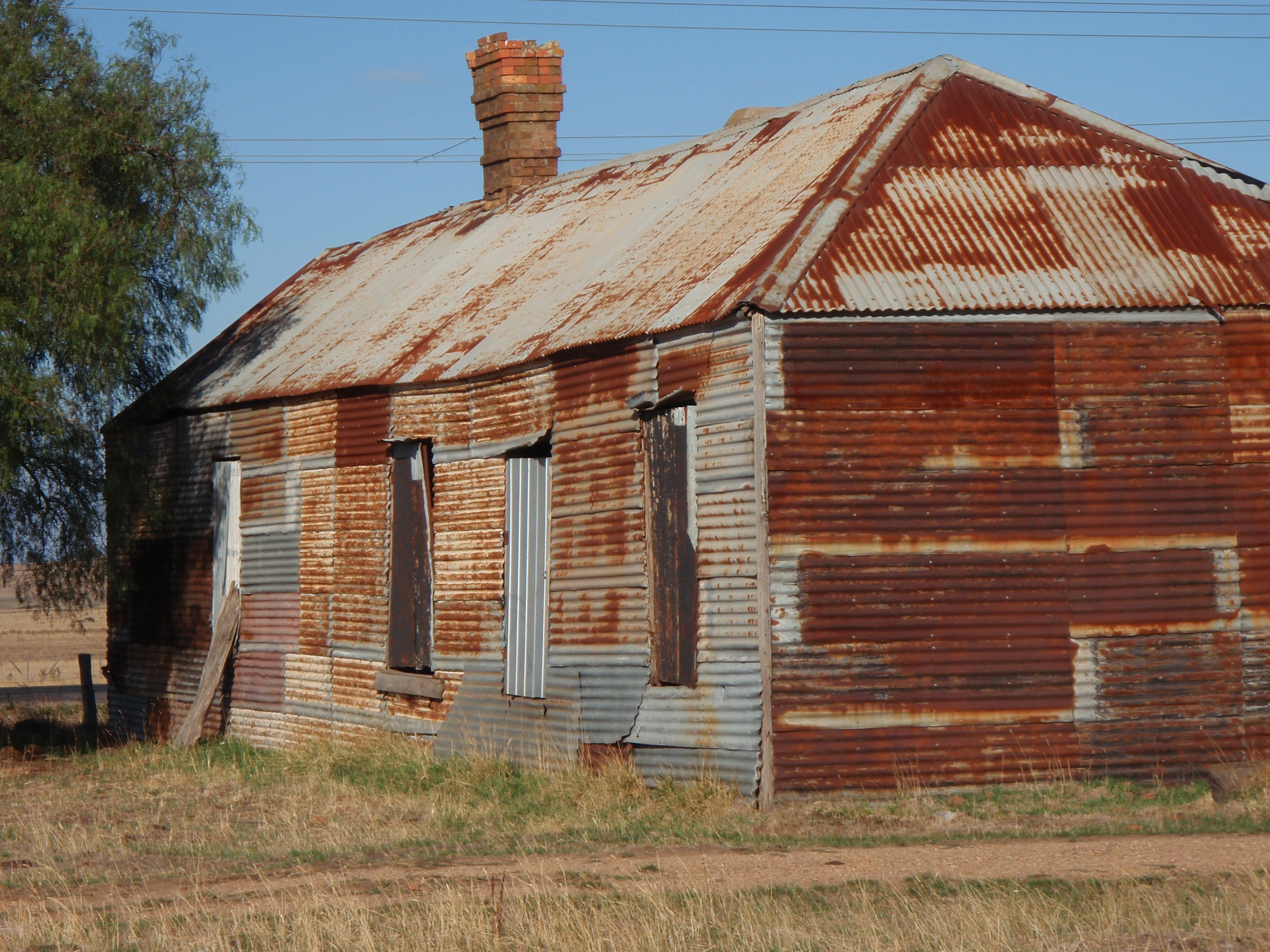
The former Duckholes Hotel at Monegeetta North

The Post Office opened on 23 January 1911 as Monegatta South, was renamed Monegeeta (sic) in 1917 then Monegeetta around 1960 and closed in 1992. Another office nearby, Duck Holes, had opened in 1866, was renamed Monegatta in 1875, North Monegeeta in 1917, North Monegeetta around 1961 and closed in 1969.

Monegeetta North, occasionally referred to as Duckholes, was historically a distinct locality, once featuring its own Hotel (1862-1896) and State school (1868-1903). The former Hotel building remains as a local landmark for travellers on the Melbourne-Lancefield Road.

Both Monegeetta and North Monegeetta were stopping points on the Clarkefield-Lancefield railway which operated between 1881 and 1956.

== Today ==
Monegeetta features Mintaro Homestead (1882), a smaller replica of Melbourne's Government House built by a Captain Gardiner.

The main facilities used by the Land Engineering Agency of the Australian Department of Defence are located near the town. These facilities are used to test Australian Army equipment.

The town contains a CFA fire station and general store, and a private bus company operates a commuter bus service to Melbourne for residents from Monday to Friday.
