= Lancefield Swamp =

Fossil deposit near Lancefield, Victoria, Australia

Coordinates: 37.283833°S 144.723617°E

The Lancefield Swamp is a rich fossil deposit from the Pleistocene epoch was discovered in the 19th century near Lancefield, Victoria, Australia.

== Description ==
The site consists of a bone bed lying directly atop a layer of fluvial gravel between layers of clay. The layer of bones is estimated to contain the remains of perhaps 10,000 individual Pleistocene animals. A total of at least six megafauna species are represented, although the majority of bones are from the eastern grey kangaroo (Macropus giganteus) or the extinct Macropus titan, which was closely related to the eastern grey.

Human artefacts were found in the bone bed and in the overlying clay, but evidence of reworking by water flow has been noted. Thus it appears possible such artefacts are intrusions.

The Lancefield Swamp fossil site is important in the debate over the time of and causes of the extinction of Australian megafauna. Humans are estimated to have arrived in Pleistocene Australia, or prehistoric Sahul, at anything from 60ka to about 45ka.

Initial radiocarbon dates yielded estimates of 31ka, a comparatively young age, approaching the Last Glacial Maximum. Horton therefore claimed that Lancefield is a decisive example of the survival of Australian Megafauna for many thousands of years after the arrival of modern humans in prehistoric Sahul.

However, when Lancefield Swamp was investigated by van Huet, it was found that the bones had been reworked by fast-flowing water at some time after the animals had died. That conclusion was based upon observations that the bones show signs of post-depositional wear, that they are all disarticulated, that complete skulls are lacking, that the majority of bones are large, and that they tend to be aligned along a common axis, indicative of the direction of water flow. Therefore, it appeared probable that lighter bones had been washed away whereas heavier bones remained in situ. Dating of Diprotodon teeth from the bone bed yielded ages of 46-56ka by means of ESR, and a minimum of 32ka by means of Carbon-14 dating.

However, excavations begun in 2004 by Dortch et al. suggest that the Lancefield megafauna remains have not been disturbed since deposition. Therefore, is it is hoped that dates assigned to the Lancefield bones are reliable and therefore represent their true age since burial. If age estimates turn out to be on the high side, say 60ka or greater, the Lancefield bones may contribute less to our understanding of the effects of human activities upon the Australian Megafauna, since such an age may pre-date the arrival of modern humans in Sahul.

On the other hand, if the dates are comparatively recent, say less than 35ka, then humans would be exculpated as a causative agent of the decline of megafauna. However, if the estimate falls somewhere close to 46ka, then human arrival, and the final demise of the megafauna, could be associated.

== See also ==
- Australian Megafauna
- Lancefield, Victoria
- List of fossil sites (with link directory)
