= Rochford, Victoria =

Rochford Victoria
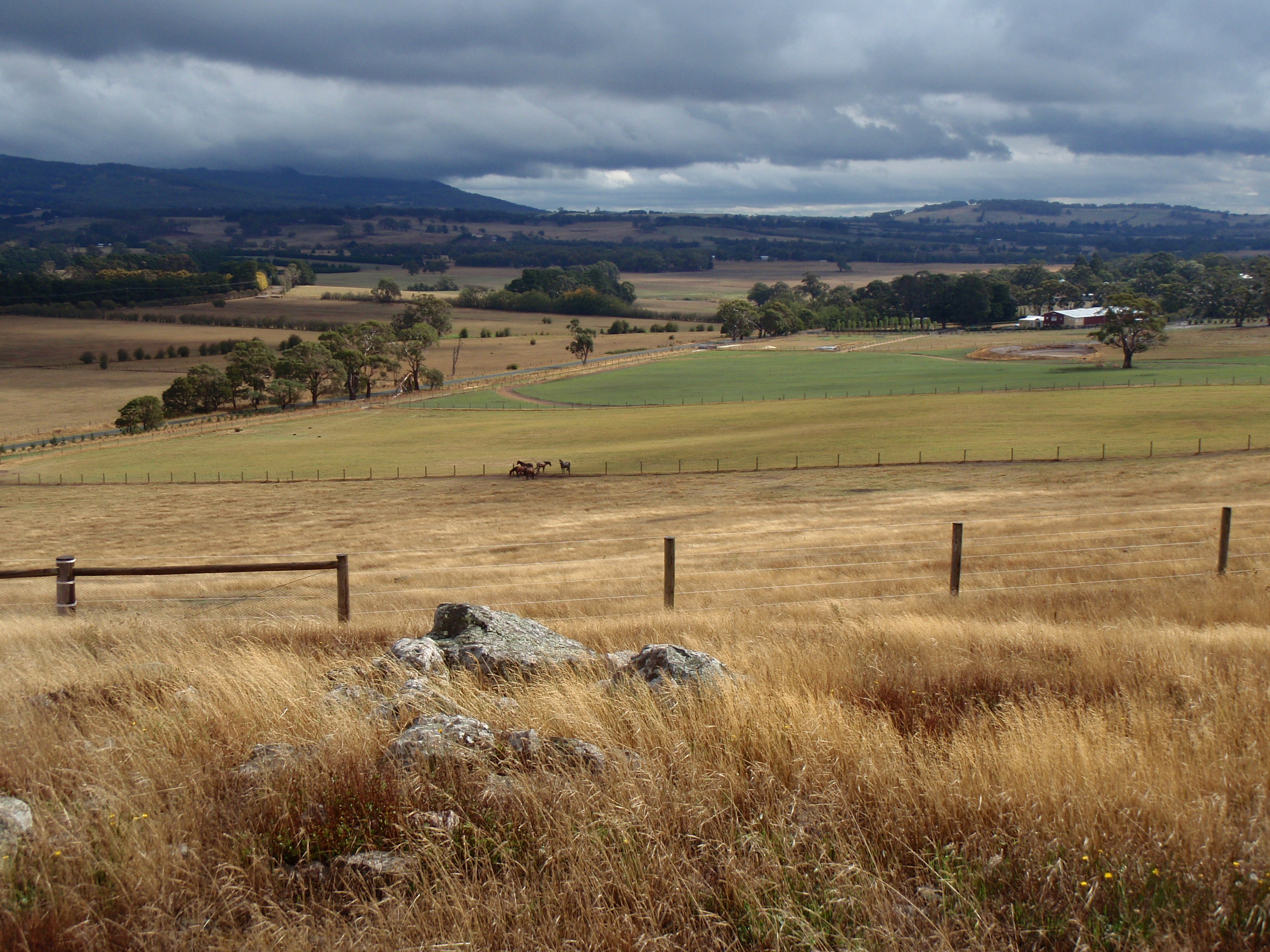
- View over Rochford, looking west

- Coordinates: 37°19′S 144°41′E
- Population: 71 (SAL 2016)
- Established: 1860
- Postcode(s): 3442
- Elevation: 550 m (1,804 ft)
- LGA(s): Shire of Macedon Ranges
- State electorate(s): Macedon
- Federal division(s): McEwen
Localities around Rochford:
Cobaw	Cobaw	Lancefield
Newham	Rochford	Lancefield/Romsey
Hesket	Kerrie	Romsey

Rochford is a locality in the Macedon Ranges Shire, in Victoria, Australia, on the Lancefield-Woodend Road (now signposted as the Rochford Road).

The district once contained a number of public and religious buildings, all of which now appear to have been removed or demolished. These included a Public Hall, Anglican Church, Presbyterian Church, and tennis courts.

Rochford Post Office opened on 10 March 1863 and closed in 1965.

The 1857 red brick building, and 1870 principal's residence, of the former Rochford North School (State School 540) are still standing and are now a privately owned luxury holiday rental.
