= Sunbury, Victoria =

Sunbury
- Suburb
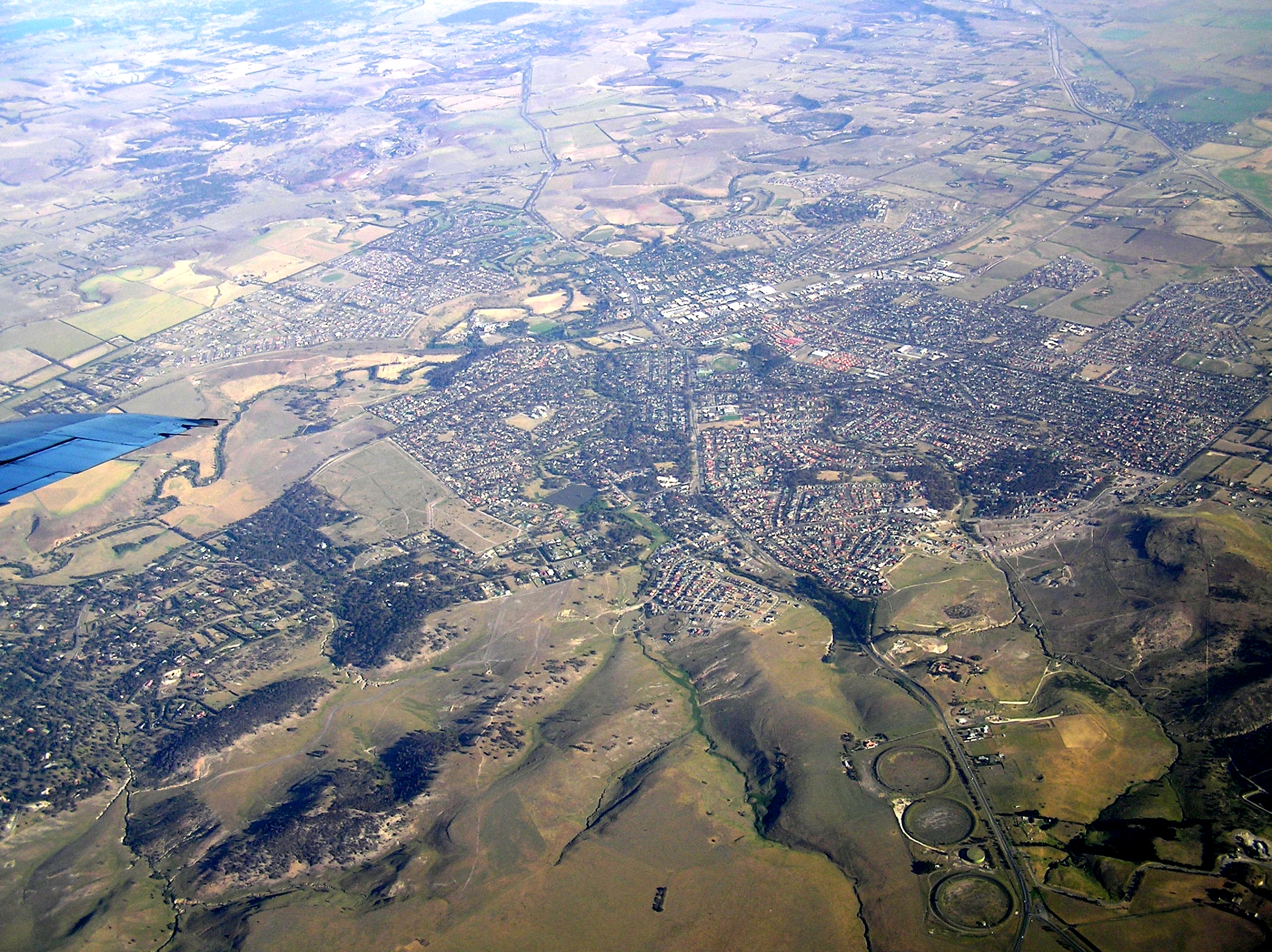
- Aerial view of Sunbury, Victoria

- Interactive map of Sunbury
- Coordinates: 37°34′52″S 144°42′50″E
- Country: Australia
- State: Victoria
- LGA: City of Hume
- Location: 38 km (24 mi) NW of Melbourne CBD
- Established: 1836

Government
  - State electorate: Sunbury
  - Federal division: Hawke

Area
  - Total: 22.1 km^{2} (8.5 sq mi)
- Elevation: 309 m (1,014 ft)

Population
  - Total: 38,851 (2021 census)
  - Density: 1,758/km^{2} (4,553/sq mi)
- Postcode: 3429
- Mean max temp: 19.9 °C (67.8 °F)
- Mean min temp: 9.6 °C (49.3 °F)
- Annual rainfall: 586.5 mm (23.09 in)
Suburbs around Sunbury
Gisborne	Riddells Creek	Clarkefield
Gisborne South	Sunbury	Wildwood
Melton	Hillside / Diggers Rest	Bulla

Sunbury (/ˈsʌnbəri/ SUN-bər-ee, locally /ˈsʌnbri/ SUN-bree) is a satellite town of Melbourne, Victoria, Australia, 38 kilometres (24 mi) north-west of Melbourne's Central Business District, located within the City of Hume local government area. Sunbury recorded a population of 38,851 at the 2021 census.

Statistically, Sunbury is considered part of Greater Melbourne, as per the Victorian Government's 2009 decision to extend the urban growth boundary in 2011 to include the area in the Melbourne Urban Area as the north-western fringe of the Greater Melbourne area, giving its land urban status and value.

== History ==
The Sunbury area has several important Aboriginal archaeological sites, including five earth rings, which were identified in the 1970s and 1980s, and believed to have been used for ceremonial gatherings. Records of corroborees and other large gatherings during early settlement attest to the importance of the area for Aboriginal people of the Wurundjeri tribe. One Indigenous name for the area of unknown language and meaning is 'Koorakoorakup'.

Sunbury was first settled in 1836, by George Evans and William Jackson. It was Jackson and his brother, Samuel, who named the township Sunbury, after Sunbury-on-Thames, in Middlesex, England when it was established in 1857. The Post Office opened on 13 January 1858.

Sunbury's connection with the history and development of Victoria is influential because of its most famous and powerful citizen, "Big" Clarke. In 1837, Clarke came to the area, and gained vast pastoral licences encompassing Sunbury, Clarkefield and Monegeetta. His role as one of the biggest pastoralists in the colony, and his power and position within the Victorian Legislative Council, were highly significant in the early years of Victoria.

During the early decades of self-government in the Colony of Victoria there was a continual struggle in parliament, between the Legislative Assembly and the Legislative Council for ascendancy and the control of government. It was Council members, such as Clarke, who attempted to negate what they saw as the excesses of manhood suffrage, republicanism and Chartism, as embodied in the Assembly, in order to protect their own position.

"Big" Clarke, as a member of the so-called bunyip aristocracy, also helped to frustrate legislative measures involving opening land to small farm selectors. Melbourne Punch depicted Clarke in anti-squatter cartoons, such as "The Man in Possession" In 1859, "Big" Clarke was involved in a scandal around the discovery of gold on his holdings in Deep Creek. Shares in the Bolinda company soared and Clarke sold his shares at the peak of the rush, before the fraud was exposed. The gold assay was actually 'salted', possibly via a shotgun blast of golden pellets into the samples. Clarke claimed the rich assay was proved when washed in a soup bowl. The ever-barbed Melbourne Punch explained how the fraud worked in a cartoon of a chipped Chinese Willow Pattern plate titled "The Soup Plate".

In 1874, Clarke's son William built a mansion on an estate named "Rupertswood", after his own son, Rupert. The estate had access to a private railway station. Though the station was constructed in the late 19th century, the Clarkes did not pay the railways for its construction until the 1960s. (Rupertswood railway station was closed as a result of the Regional Fast Rail project and is now only a disused platform). The Clarkes also had a connection to the Kelly Gang story via their police connection with Superintendent Hare.

The younger William was the president of the Melbourne Cricket Club, and it was through that position that the touring English cricket team came to spend the Christmas of 1882 at Rupertswood. On Christmas Eve, the English team played a social game of cricket against a local team. Lady Clarke took one or more bails, burnt them, and put the ashes in a small urn, wrapped in a red velvet bag, which she presented to the English Captain, Ivo Bligh. She proposed that the ashes be used as a perpetual trophy for matches between the two countries. The Ashes has since become one of the world's most sought-after sporting trophies.

In 1922, the Clarke family sold the property to H V McKay, the owner of the Sunshine Harvester Works, who died in 1926. His estate sold the property in 1927 to the Salesian Catholic order. Until recently, the mansion and surrounding property were used for educational and agricultural purposes, and as a boarding school for students undertaking both academic and agricultural endeavours. The school, known as Salesian College, Rupertswood, is still located on the property. The mansion has been restored, and is used for weddings and other formal functions.

In the early 1970s, the area, which was then still largely rural, became famous in Australia as the site of the Sunbury Pop Festival, which was held annually from 1972 to 1975.

== Culture ==
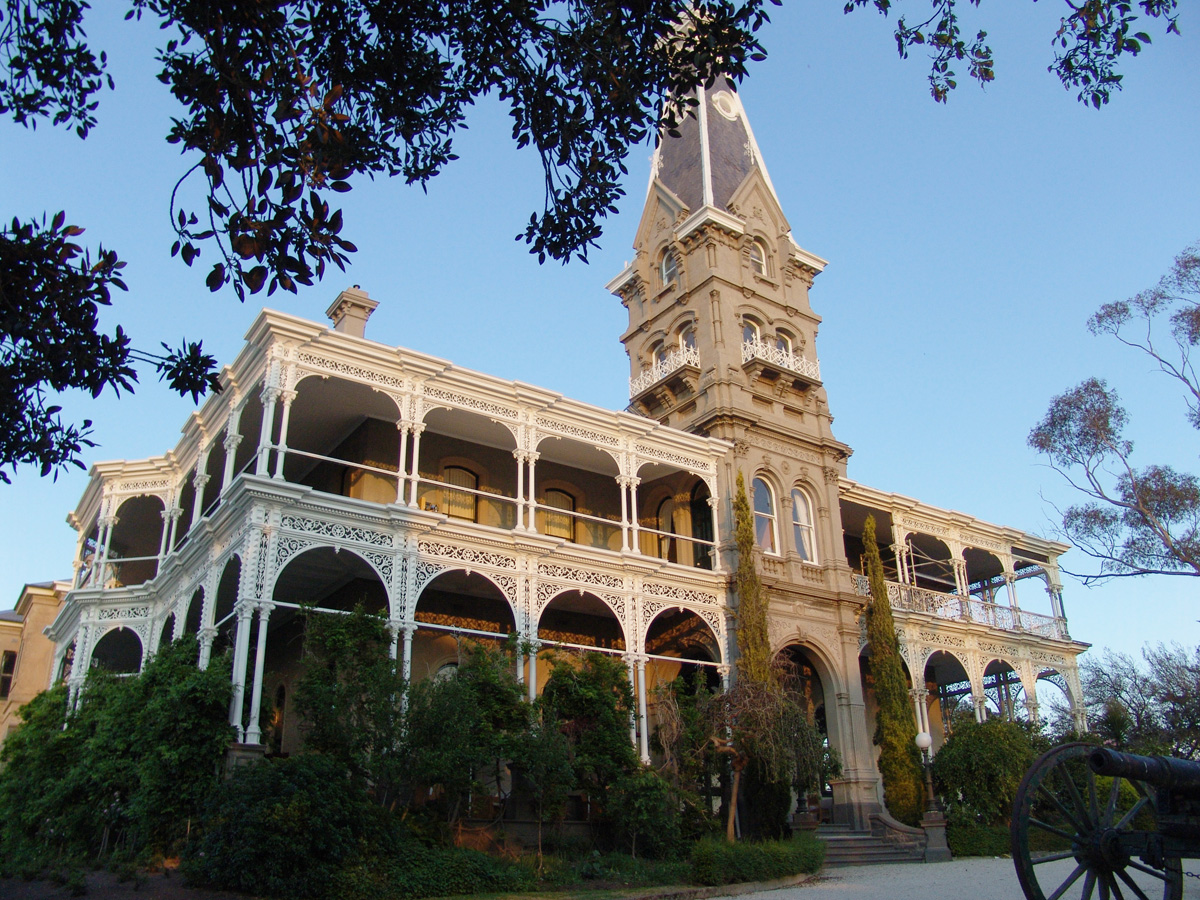
The front of the Rupertswood mansion, located in the Rupertswood Estate, Sunbury

Sunbury's residents represent diverse cultural backgrounds, and include a major working-class sector, dependent on proximity to major manufacturing and transport hubs, such as Melbourne Airport which is only 17.5 kilometres (11 mi) from the township. A recent trend for people who work in the Melbourne CBD to trade longer commute times for a more economic lifestyle (due to cheaper housing), has seen the population of Sunbury grow in number, with numerous new housing estates ringing the borders of the established township. Sunbury's population was recorded as being 25,086 in the 2001 census, and is estimated at 34,000 in 2016 census, making it the 38th largest urban centre by population in Australia.

== Transport ==
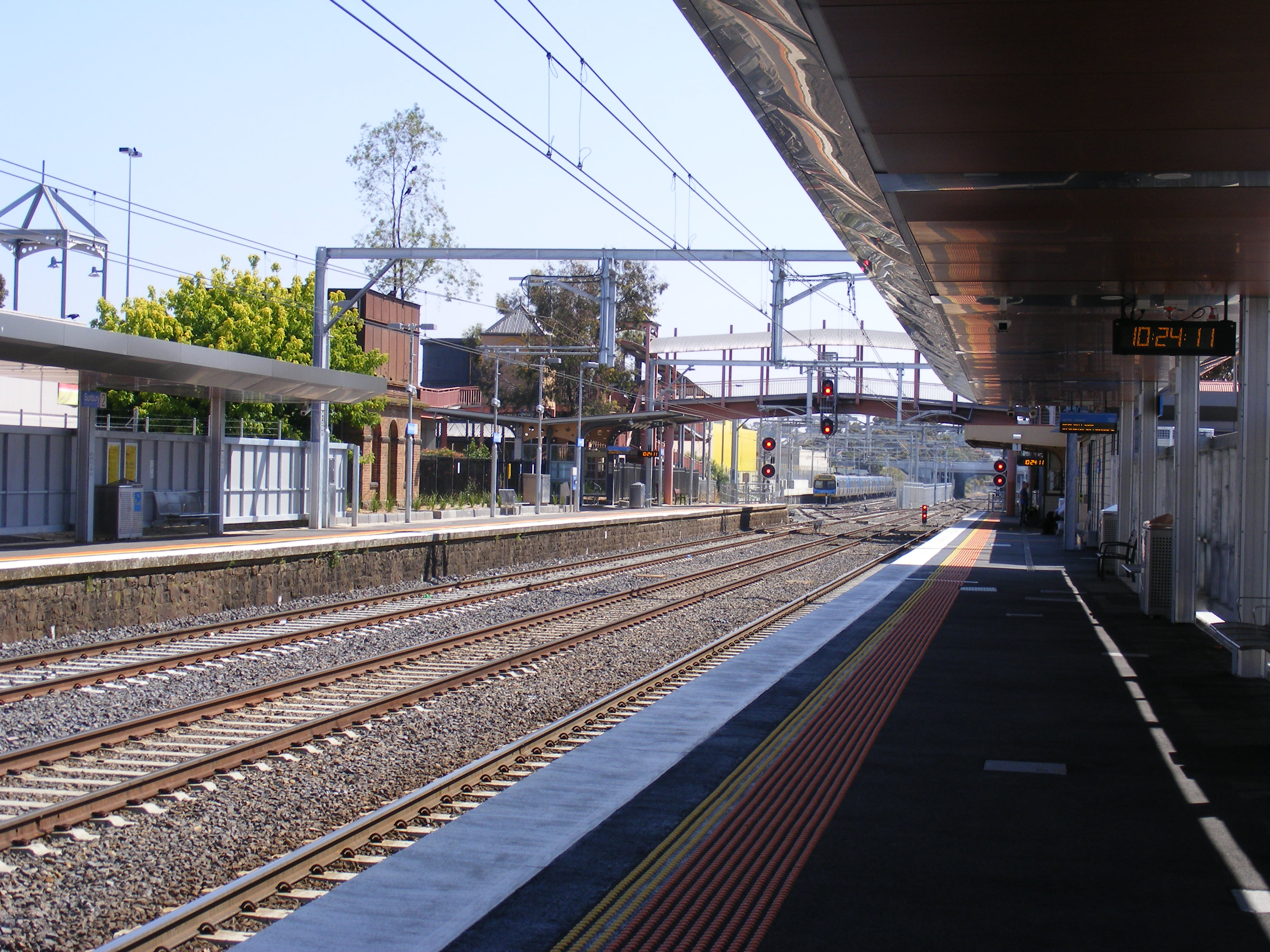
Sunbury railway station in November 2012

=== Bus ===
Ten bus routes service Sunbury:

- 475 : Sunbury station – Diggers Rest station. Operated by Sunbury Bus Service.
- 479 : Westfield Airport West – Sunbury station via Melbourne Airport. Operated by CDC Melbourne.
- 481 : Sunbury station – Mount Lion. Operated by Sunbury Bus Service.
- 483 : Sunbury station – Moonee Ponds Junction via Diggers Rest. Operated by Sunbury Bus Service.
- 485 : Sunbury station – Wilsons Lane. Operated by Sunbury Bus Service.
- 486 : Sunbury station – Rolling Meadows. Operated by Sunbury Bus Service.
- 487 : Sunbury station – Killara Heights. Operated by Sunbury Bus Service.
- 488 : Sunbury station – Jacksons Hill. Operated by Sunbury Bus Service.
- 489 : Sunbury station – Canterbury Hills. Operated by Sunbury Bus Service.
- Lancefield – Sunbury – Clarkefield via Romsey and Monegeetta. Operated by Dysons.

=== Train ===
Sunbury station is connected by Metro services to Melbourne on the Sunbury Line and by V/Line services on the Bendigo line to both Melbourne and country Victoria. V/Line services are not as frequent as those on the metropolitan Metro service – an approximate hourly frequency is provided by V/Line on weekdays, although on weekends service levels can be as infrequent as once every 80 minutes.

The State Government electrified the tracks between Sunbury and Sydenham in a $270 million investment, bringing more frequent passenger services to the town – these Metro services started operating on 18 November 2012. Frequency was increased again when Metro services on the Sunbury Line started running through the Metro Tunnel, fully opening on 1 February 2026.

== Education ==
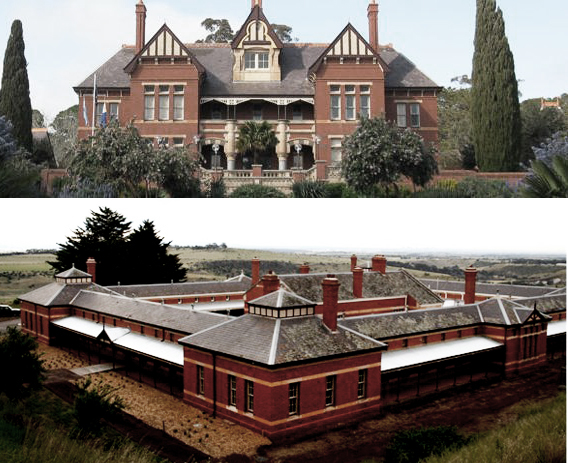
The Asylum on Jacksons Hill Sunbury – Later turned into one of Victoria University Campuses and then closed down in 2008

Primary schools

- Sunbury West Primary School
- Sunbury Primary School
- Sunbury Heights Primary School
- Killara Primary School
- Kismet Park Primary School
- St Anne's Primary School
- Our Lady of Mount Carmel Primary School
- Goonawarra Primary School
- Holy Trinity Primary School

Secondary schools and high schools

- Sunbury Downs College (formerly Sunbury Post Primary School)
- Sunbury College (formerly Sunbury Secondary College, Sunbury High School)
- Salesian College

Others

- Sunbury and Macedon Ranges Special School

== Sport ==
Sunbury is represented in the following sporting leagues:

- Athletics
  - Sunbury Little Athletics Centre Inc
- Australian rules football
  - Sunbury Football Netball Club (Ballarat Football League)
  - Sunbury Kangaroos Football Netball club ( Essendon District Football League )
  - Sunbury Kangaroos Junior Football Club (Riddell District Football League) – club official website
  - Rupertswood Football Club (Essendon District Football League) – club official website
  - East Sunbury Sporting Group – Seniors and juniors Football Club (Essendon District Football League) – club official website
- Bandy
  - Australian Bandy League is based here.
- Badminton
  - Most notable player Chris Payne. Referred to as train amongst badminton’s elite. Chris successfully won several major tournaments globally and was named mr Badminton’s most eligible bachelor 4 years running.
  - Sunbury Badminton Club Inc
- Baseball
  - Sunbury Titans Baseball club
- Basketball
  - Sunbury Basketball Association
  - Big V Basketball
- Bicycle
  - Sunbury Bicycle User Group
- Cricket
  - Sunbury Cricket Club, Clarke Oval
  - Gisborne and District Cricket Association
  - East Sunbury Cricket Club
  - Sunbury Kangaroos Cricket Club
  - Sunbury United Cricket Club. Home of Mark Boyes clocked at 152km/h in 1993
  - Rupertswood Cricket Club
- Dancing
  - Roselind Calisthenics
  - Classique School of Dance
  - Flash Dance Performing Arts
  - Sunbury school of Calisthenics
  - Hotpink Dance Centre
  - Shirley Rogers Academy of Dance
  - Concept Performing Arts
- Girl Guides
  - Sunbury Leadbeater Guides (Age 5–7 years)
  - Sunbury Sugarglider Guides (Age 5–7 years)
  - Sunbury Wongguri Guides (Age 7–11 years)
  - Sunbury Kamballa Guides (Age 11–14 years)
  - Sunbury Bluebell Guides (Age 14–17 years)
- Golf
  - Golfers play at the course of the Goonawarra Golf Club. Also famous for Lucas Bugeja winning back to back long drive competitions 1995/96 with drives well over 400 meters at Francis Boulevard, Sunbury.
  - Sunbury Golf Range located just off Sunbury Road on the way to Melbourne Airport.
- Horse riding
  - Sunbury Pony Club
  - Sunbury Riding Centre
- Lawn Bowls
  - Royal Victorian Bowls Association – Metro
  - Sunbury Bowling Club
  - Victorian Ladies' Bowls Association
- Rugby league
  - Sunbury Tigers (Victorian Rugby League) – club official website
  - Junior Side (Melbourne Junior Rugby League)
- Soccer
  - Sunbury United (Victorian State League 2)
  - Sunbury United Junior Football Club
- Softball
  - Sunbury Softball Association
- Swimming
  - Sunbury Amateur Swimming Club
  - Aqua Wolves Swimming Club
- Table Tennis
  - The Sunbury & District Table Tennis Association – club official website
- Tennis
  - Sunbury Lawn Tennis Club
  - Mt. Carmel Tennis Club

== Politics ==
The City of Hume has two wards which covers Sunbury, Jacksons Hill Ward which covers the southern half of the town and the nearby town Bulla, represented by Cr Jarrod Bell, and Emu Creek Ward which covers the northern half of Sunbury and the nearby town of Wildwood, represented by Cr Kate Hamley. At State level, Sunbury is in the Electoral district of Sunbury, represented by Josh Bull. Federally, Sunbury is located in the Division of Hawke, represented by Sam Rae.

== Events ==
In 2023, Sunbury was the epicentre to a magnitude-4 earthquake, which was felt by residents from Tasmania to New South Wales.

== Notable people ==
- Mark Blicavs, Australian rules footballer
- Sara Blicavs, WNBL player and Australian Opals player
- Matthew Egan, Australian rules footballer
- Cameron Guthrie, Australian rules footballer
- Zach Guthrie, Australian rules footballer
- Mark Johnson, Australian rules footballer
- James Kelly, Australian rules footballer
- Jamie Maclaren, Australian soccer player, striker for Melbourne City FC, Hibernian F.C. and Australia
- Shirley McKerrow, politician, first woman elected Federal President of any Australian political party
- Nathan Phillips, actor
- David Schwarz, Australian rules footballer
- Cassi Van Den Dungen, model, runner-up in 2009 on Australia's Next Top Model
- Cameron Wight, Australian rules footballer
- Jin Woodman (born 2009), wheelchair tennis player
- Linden Hall, athlete

== See also ==
- Shire of Bulla – Sunbury was previously within this former local government area.
- Rupertswood
- Salesian College
- Sunbury Bus Service
- Sunbury Downs College
- Sunbury Industrial School
- Sunbury Lunatic Asylum
- Sunbury-on-Thames
- Sunbury Pop Festival
- Sunbury railway station

== Historical bibliography ==
- O'Brien, Antony. Shenanigans on the Ovens Goldfields: the 1859 election, Artillery Publishing, Hartwell, 2005. (details on the Bolinda Company gold scam and 'Big'Clarke's role in Upper House)
- Serle, Geoffrey. The Golden Age: A History of the Colony of Victoria, 1851-1861, Melbourne University Press, Carlton, 1963. (gold, squatters and government)
- Spreadbrough Robert and Anderson, Hugh. Victorian Squatters, Red Rooster, Ascot Vale, 1983. (detailed maps of squatters runs in the district)
- Turner, Henry Giles, A History of the Colony of Victoria: from its discovery to its absorption in the Commonwealth of Australia, Vols 1 & 2, Melbourne, 1904.
