= Clarkefield =

- Town
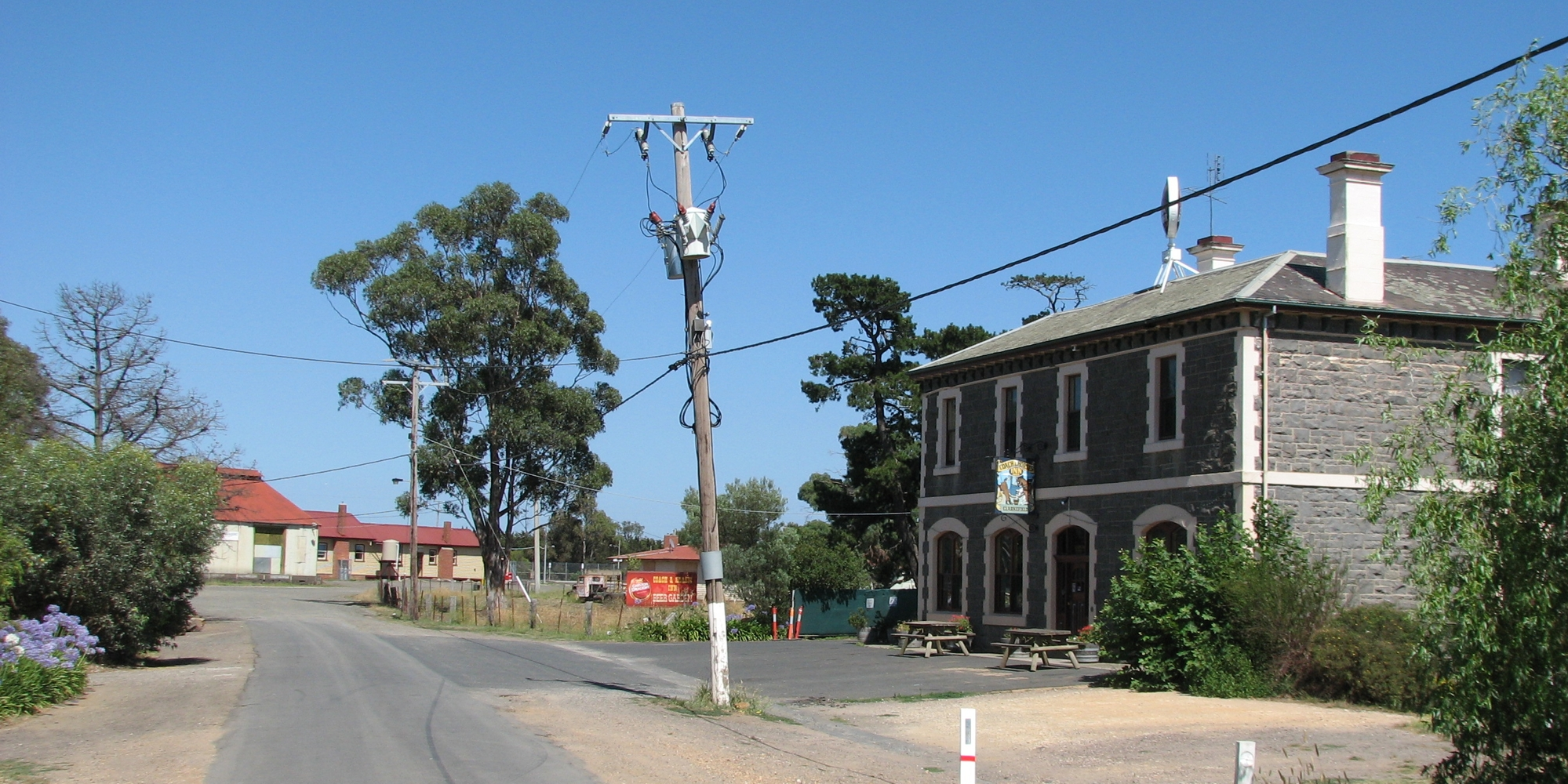
- Station Street

- Interactive map of Clarkefield
- Coordinates: 37°29′S 144°45′E
- Country: Australia
- State: Victoria
- LGAs: Shire of Macedon Ranges; City of Hume
- Location: 41 km (25 mi) NW of Melbourne; 11 km (6.8 mi) N of Sunbury; 14 km (8.7 mi) S of Romsey

Government
  - State electorates: Macedon; Sunbury
  - Federal division: McEwen
- Elevation: 308 m (1,010 ft)

Population
  - Total: 303 (2021 census)
- Postcode: 3430
- County: Bourke
Localities around Clarkefield
Riddells Creek	Bolinda; Darraweit Guim	Beveridge
Riddells Creek	Clarkefield	Mickleham
Sunbury	Wildwood	Mickleham; Oaklands Junction

Clarkefield (/ˈklɑːrkfiːld/) is a town in Victoria, Australia, 41 kilometres (25 mi) north-west of Melbourne's Central Business District, located within the City of Hume and the Shire of Macedon Ranges local government areas. Clarkefield recorded a population of 303 at the 2021 census.

Clarkefield was occupied as pastoral run, and it was named after the pastoralist, Sir William Clarke. The Clarkefield hotel and stables were established in 1857 and are now listed as heritage properties. The first school opened here in 1890.

The Post Office opened on 1 January 1862 and was known as Lancefield Road until 1881, Lancefield Junction until 1926 and closed in 1982.

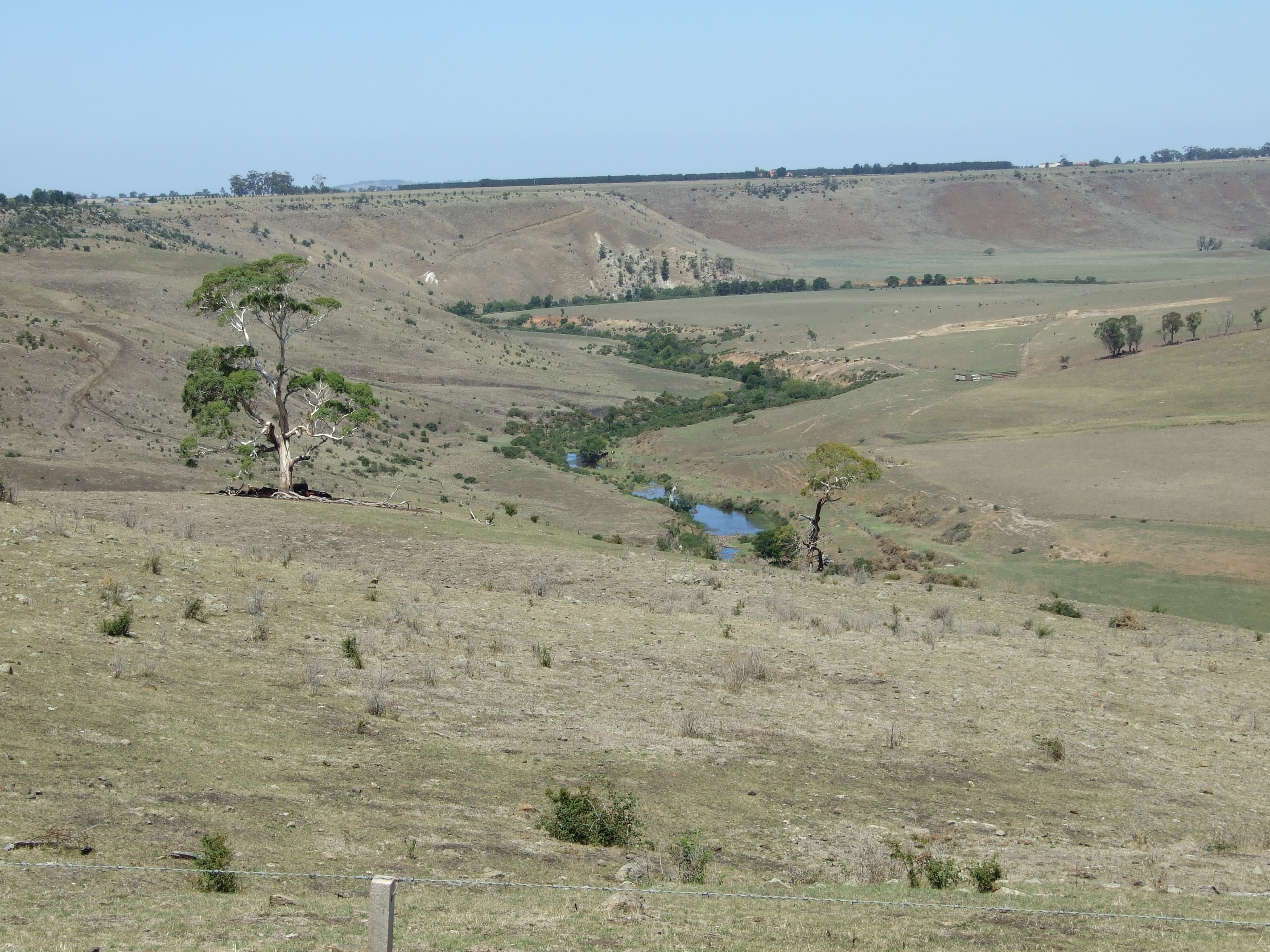
Jacksons Creek, a tributary of the Maribyrnong river at Clarkefield

== See also ==
- Shire of Bulla – Parts of Clarkefield were previously within this former local government area.
- Shire of Romsey – Parts of Clarkefield were previously within this former local government area.
- Clarkefield railway station, Victoria
