= Hesket, Victoria =

Hesket
- Town
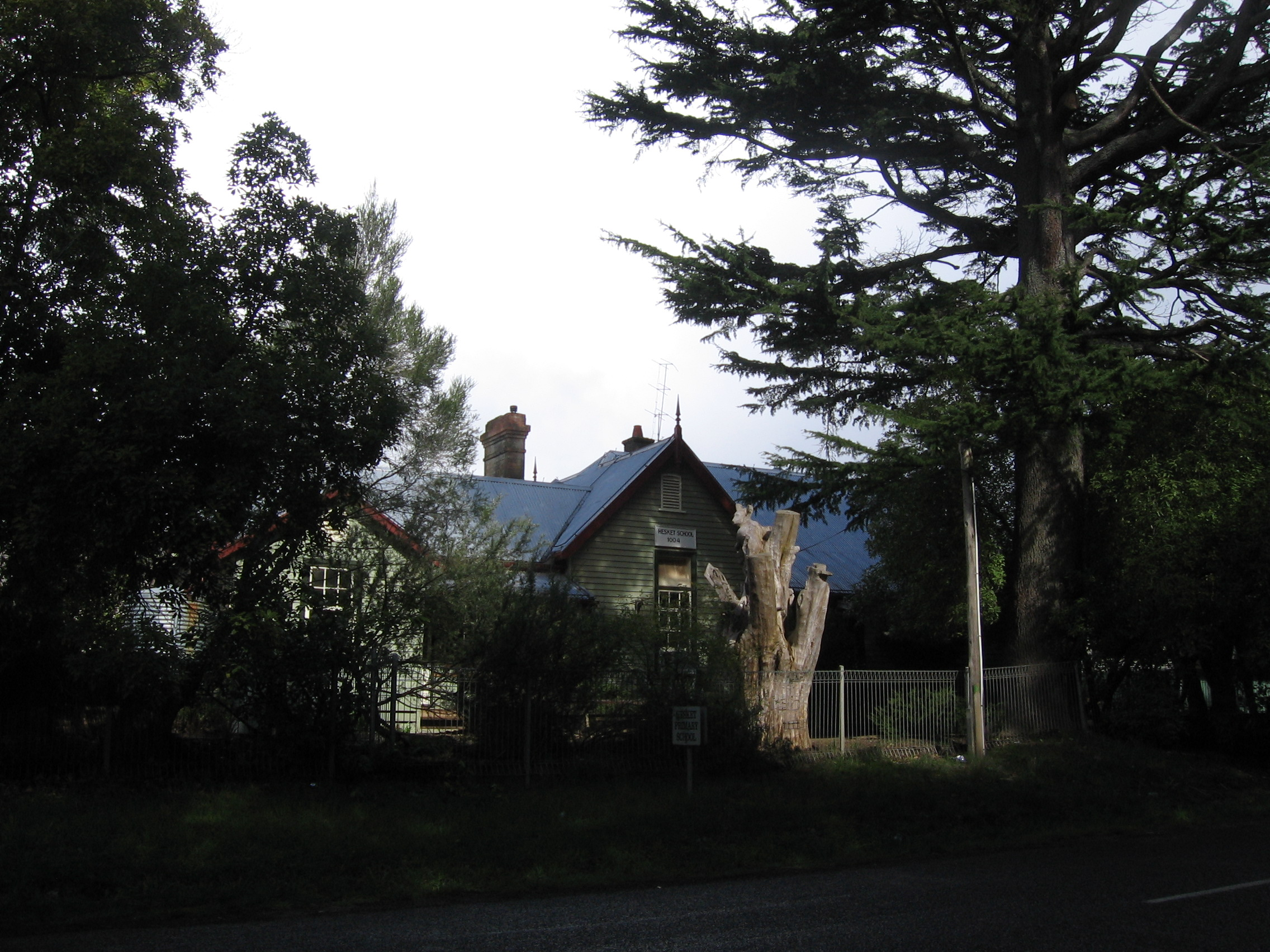
- Hesket Primary School, 2007

- Coordinates: 37°21′S 144°37′E
- Country: Australia
- State: Victoria
- LGA: Shire of Macedon Ranges
- Location: 68 km (42 mi) N of Melbourne; 24 km (15 mi) N of Gisborne; 9 km (5.6 mi) E of Woodend; 9 km (5.6 mi) W of Romsey

Government
  - State electorate: Macedon
  - Federal division: McEwen
- Elevation: 650 m (2,130 ft)

Population
  - Total: 178 (SAL 2021)
- Postcode: 3442
Localities around Hesket
Newham	Newham	Rochford
Woodend	Hesket	Romsey
Mount Macedon	Mount Macedon	Kerrie

Hesket is a locality in the Macedon Ranges Shire, in Victoria, Australia, on the northern side of the Macedon Ranges. The settlement was originally known as Ferny Creek.

Hesket post office opened on 1 November 1866 and was closed in 1971.

Today, the Hesket Primary School (State School 1004) and the Hesket-Kerrie CFA fire station are sited at the location.

== See also ==
- Woodend/Hesket Football Club
