= Romsey, Victoria =

Romsey
- Town
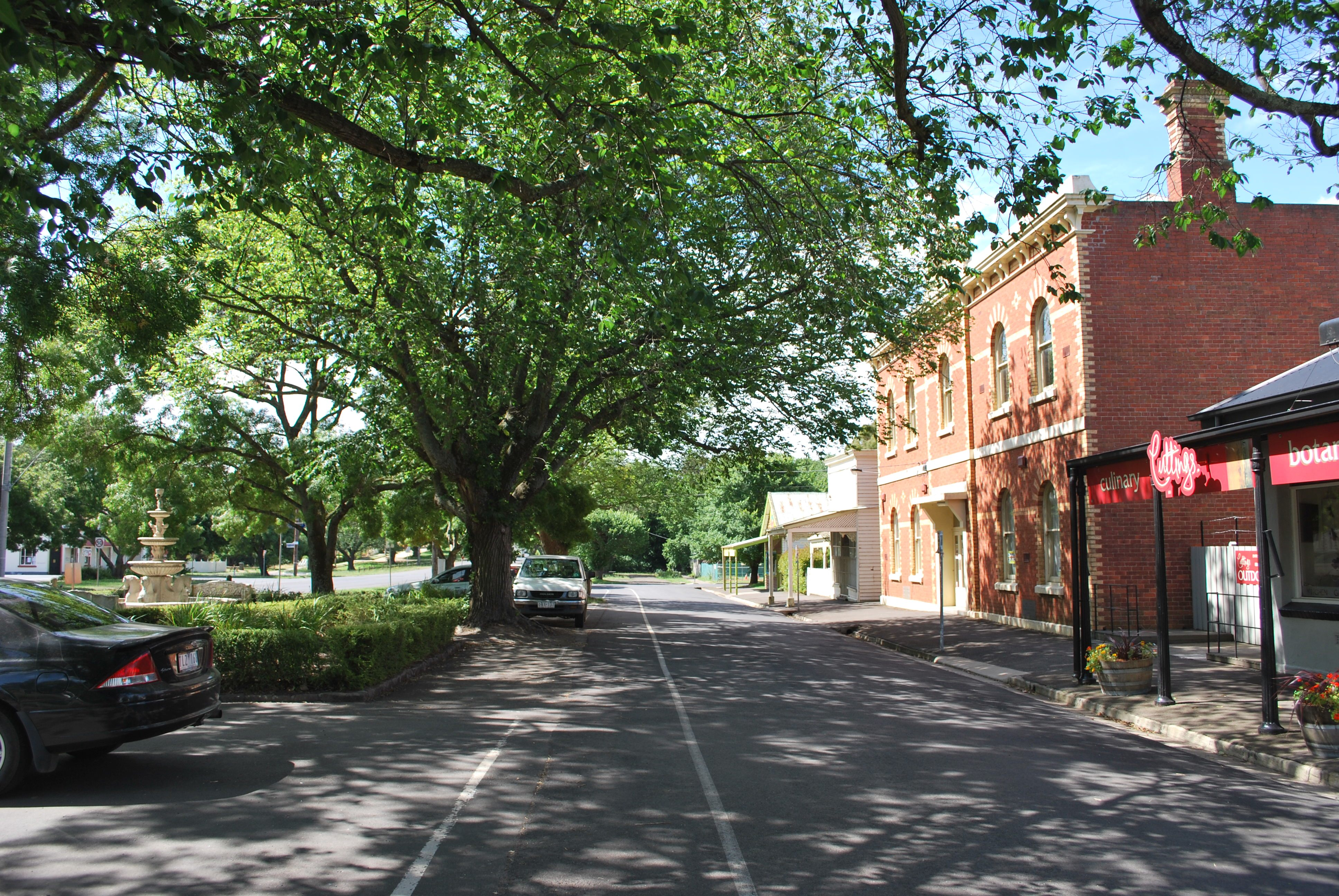
- A service lane parallel to Main Street in Romsey

- Interactive map of Romsey
- Coordinates: 37°21′S 144°45′E
- Country: Australia
- State: Victoria
- LGA: Shire of Macedon Ranges
- Location: 61 km (38 mi) from Melbourne; 21 km (13 mi) from Sunbury; 91 km (57 mi) from Bendigo; 96 km (60 mi) from Ballarat
- Established: 1850s

Government
  - State electorate: Macedon
  - Federal division: McEwen
- Elevation: 490 m (1,610 ft)

Population
  - Total: 4,934 (2021 census)
- Postcode: 3434
Localities around Romsey
Rochford	Lancefield	Willowmavin
Woodend	Romsey	Wallan
Riddells Creek	Monegeetta	Beveridge

Romsey /ˈrɒmzi/ is a town in the local government area of the Shire of Macedon Ranges in the state of Victoria, Australia. The town is 61 kilometres (38 mi) north of Melbourne. As of the 2021 Census, Romsey had a population of 4,934.

== History ==
The original location for the settlement known as Five Mile Creek was approximately 2 kilometres (1.2 mi) north of the present township. The restored Royal Mail Hotel still stands on this site although it is now a private residence.

The Post Office opened on 16 January 1858, in the Royal Mail Hotel (then the Drovers and Carriers Arms), but was named Lancefield until 19 January 1860 and Five Mile Creek until March 1860. The Post Office was moved closer to the centre of the present township in 1864.

The area was serviced by three local newspapersas well as the local community paper, The Romsey Rag, https://www.theromseyrag.com.au The Rag was first published in 1984 and produces a monthly edition from Feb to Dec each year.

The former Romsey station was a significant stopping point on the now dismantled Clarkefield-Lancefield railway between 1881 and 1956.

The Romsey Court of Petty Sessions closed on 1 January 1967, with the former courthouse subsequently sold to the Country Fire Authority.

== Today ==
Romsey has a skate park, one petrol station Ampol, banks, two supermarkets (IGA and Coles), a butcher, a fresh food deli, a chemist, several medical centres, several hairdressers, a dentist, two pubs (one closed) and a primary school. The local Lions Park is built around Five Mile Creek, a small creek running through the town. After extensive renovations were carried out in the historic Shire of Romsey Council Chambers building and the old Romsey Post Office building, a public library operates in the former Council Chambers building, which opened in 2008, whilst the old post office building operates as part of the Romsey Service Centre for the local government. There is an all abilities park space.

Four Christian churches serve Romsey: the Anglican Parish of Lancefield and Romsey; St Mary's Catholic Parish of Romsey and Lancefield; Encourage Church (A member of Australian Christian Churches); and the Romsey Uniting Church. The four churches gather together in an annual ecumenical service in winter. During the Christmas season all of the trees down the main street are also decorated like Christmas trees.

Local sporting groups are based within Romsey Park. They include Romsey Football Club competing in the Riddell District Football League and Romsey Cricket Club competing on the Gisborne District Cricket Association. Romsey Golf Club, http://romseygolfclub.net has a 12 green, 18 hole course also situated within Romsey Park. The Golf Club and the Romsey Bowls Club share clubrooms on the western side of the Park.

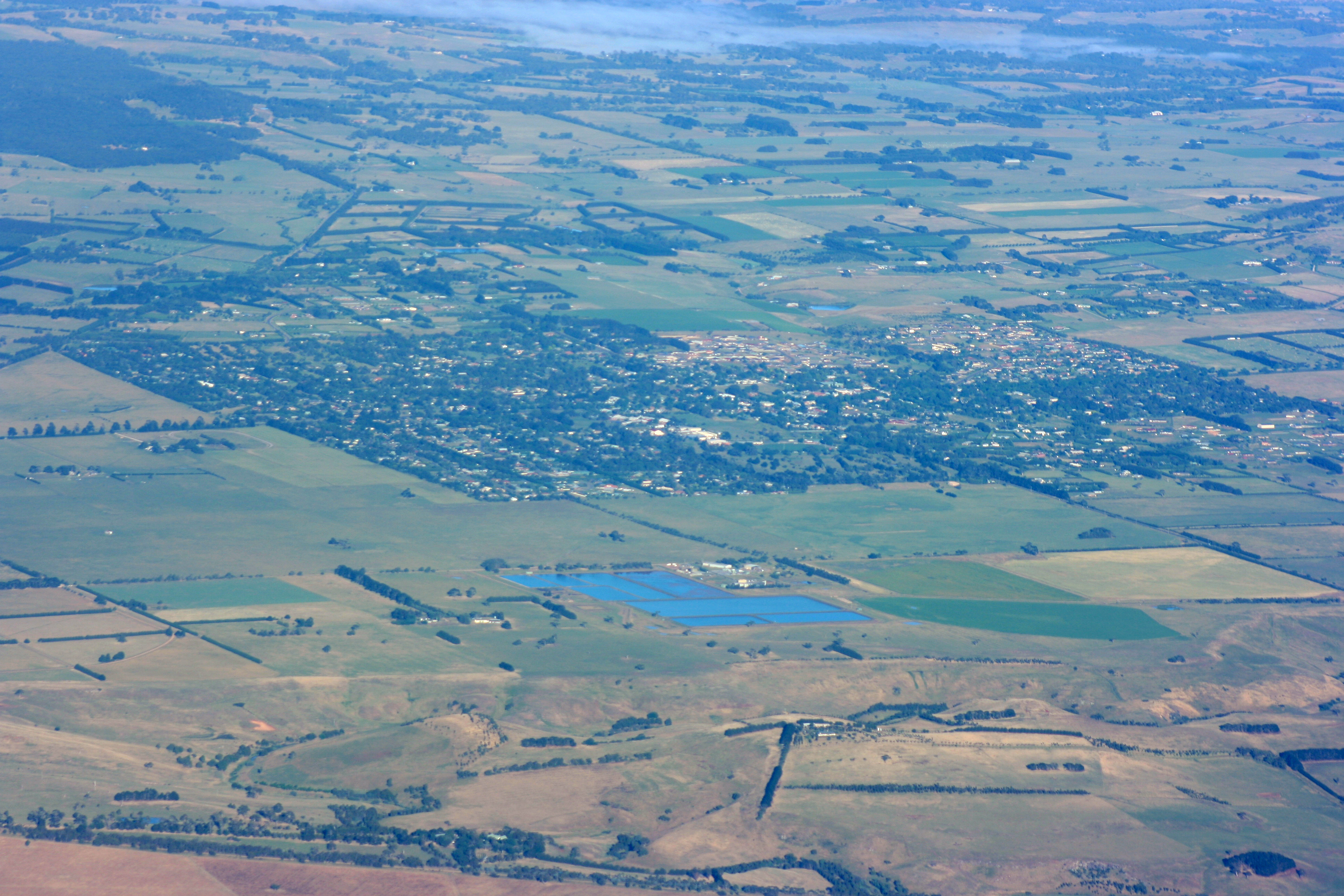

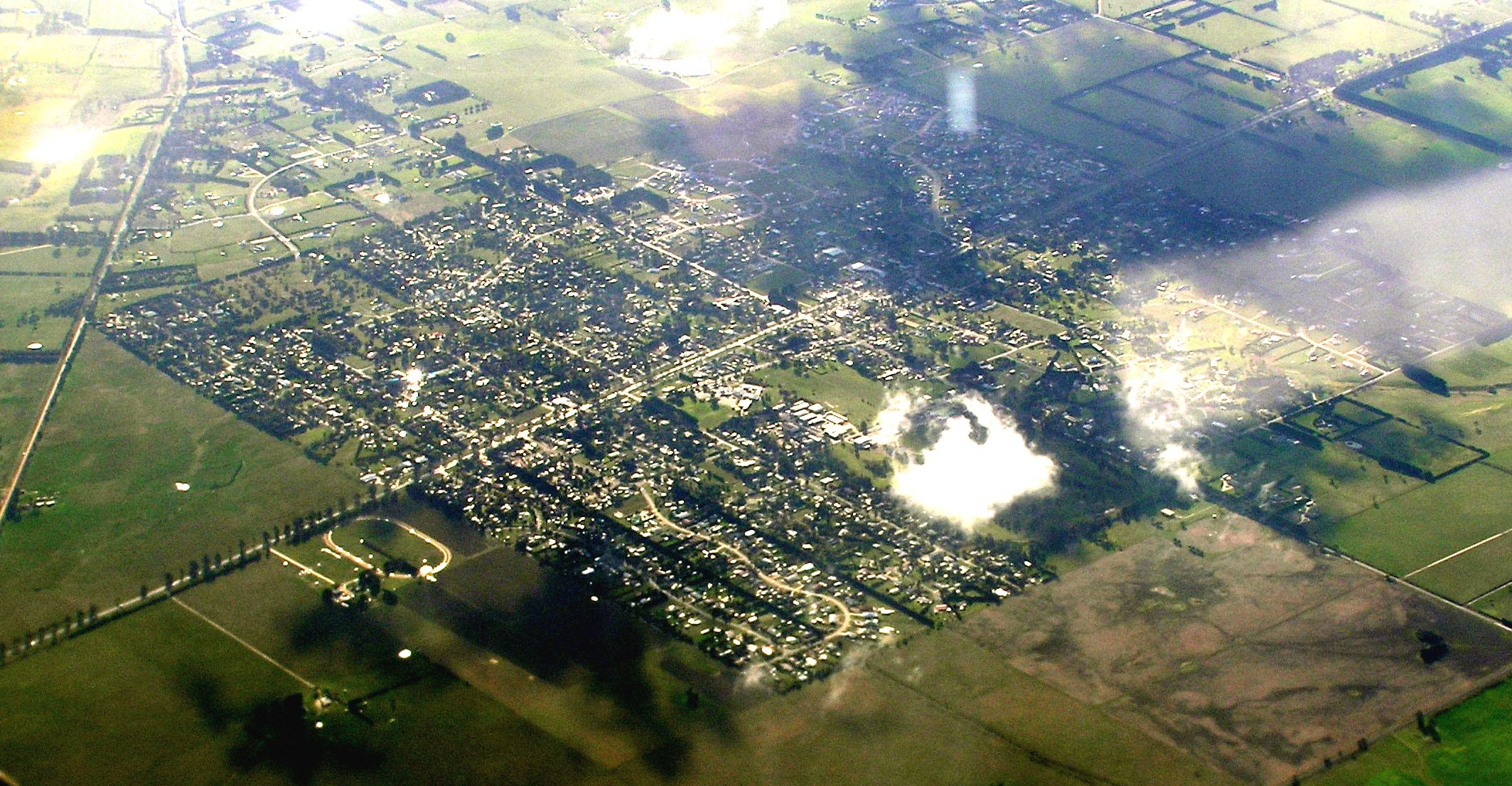

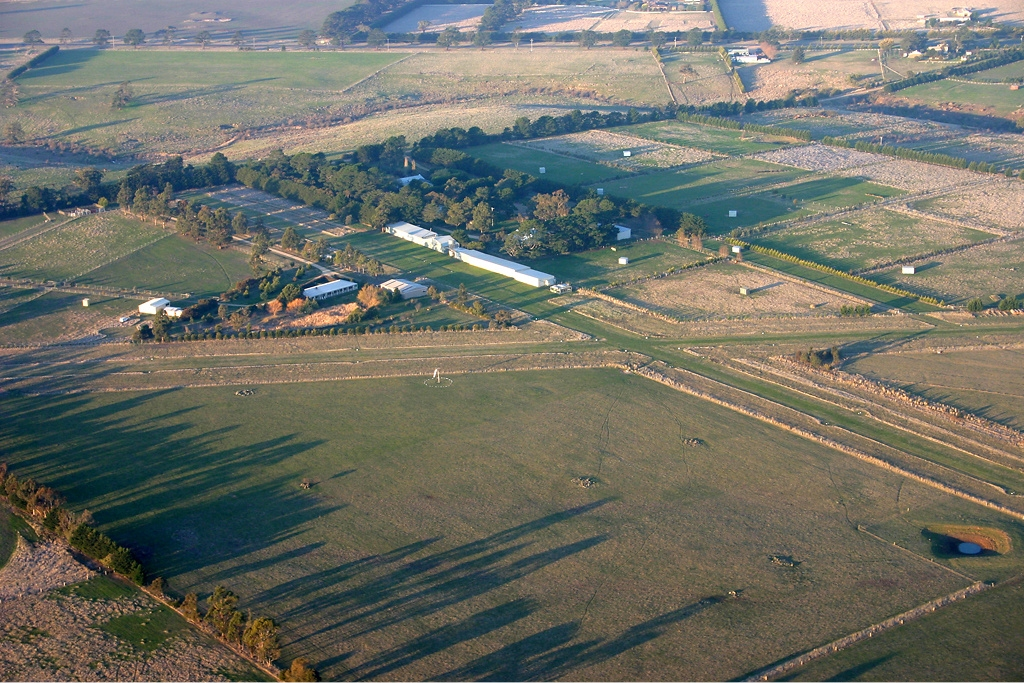
Romsey Airfield

== See also ==
Shire of Romsey
