= Lancefield =

- Town
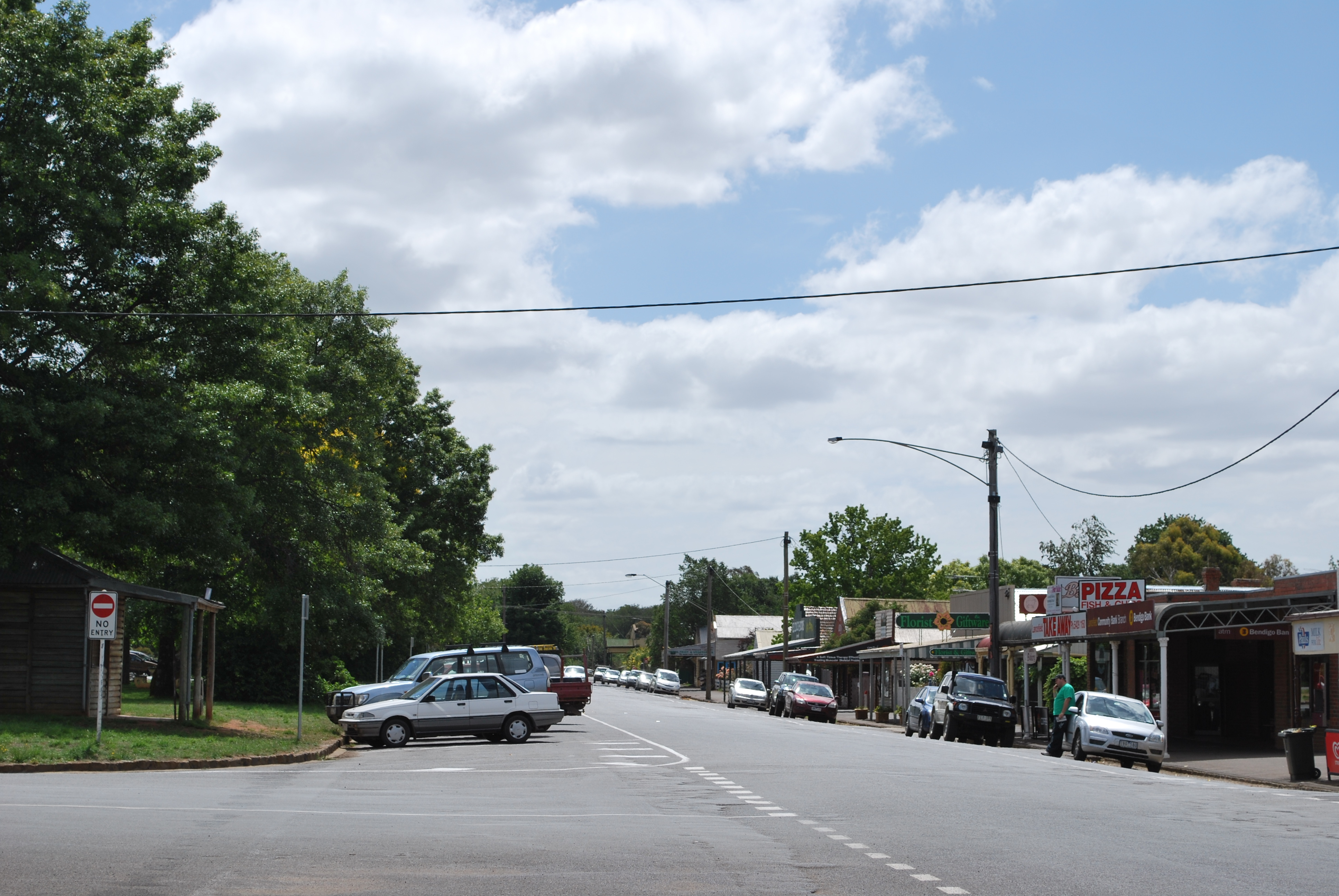
- Main street, Lancefield

- Interactive map of Lancefield
- Coordinates: 37°16′0″S 144°43′0″E
- Country: Australia
- State: Victoria
- LGA: Shire of Macedon Ranges
- Location: 69 km (43 mi) from Melbourne; 21 km (13 mi) from Kilmore; 83 km (52 mi) from Bendigo; 8 km (5.0 mi) from Romsey

Government
  - State electorate: Macedon
  - Federal division: McEwen
- Elevation: 495 m (1,624 ft)

Population
  - Total: 2,743 (2021 census)
- Postcode: 3435
Localities around Lancefield
| Benloch | Pyalong | Pyalong |
| Newham | Lancefield | Willowmavin |
| Rochford | Romsey | Wallan |

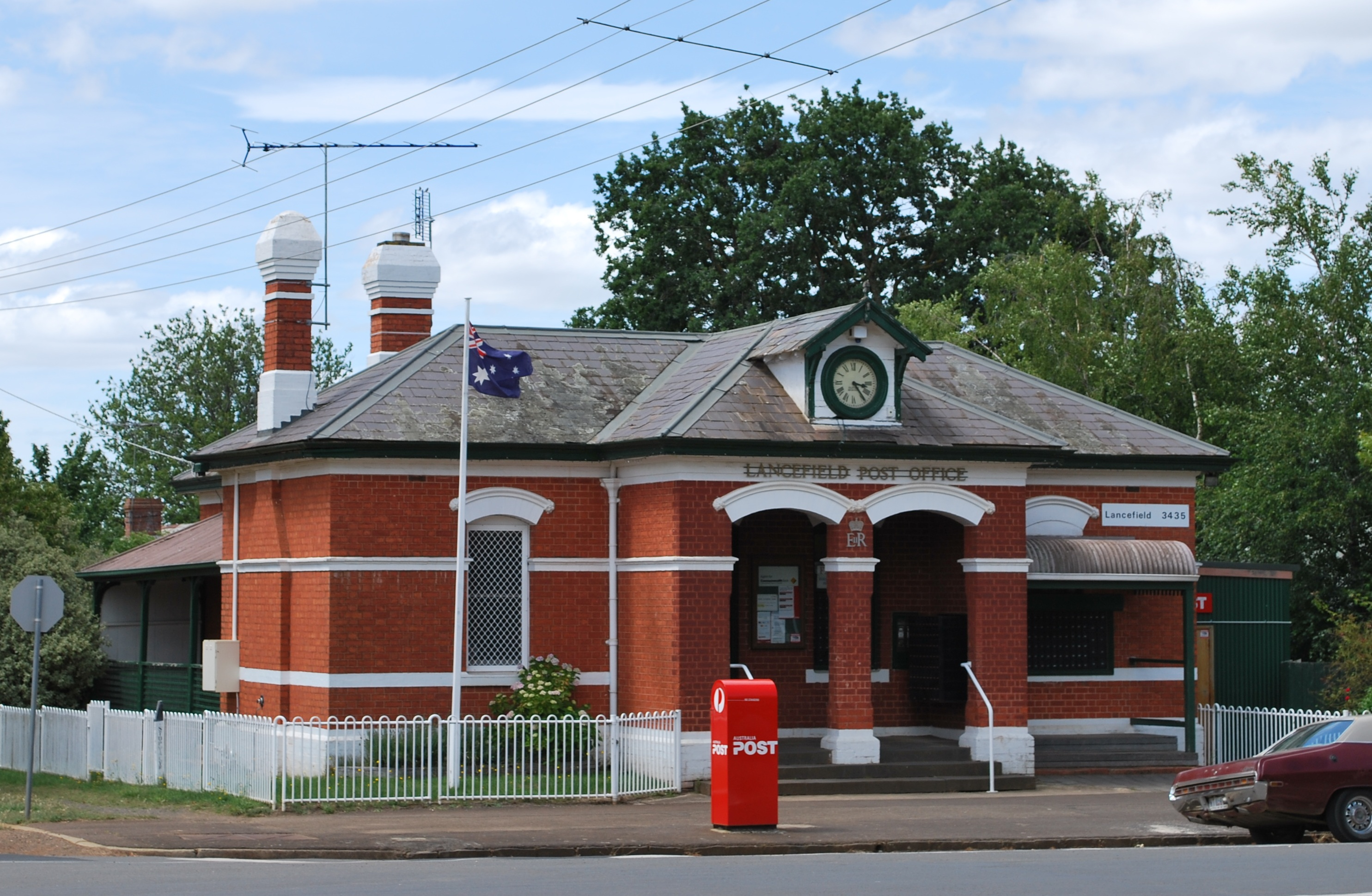
Lancefield Post Office

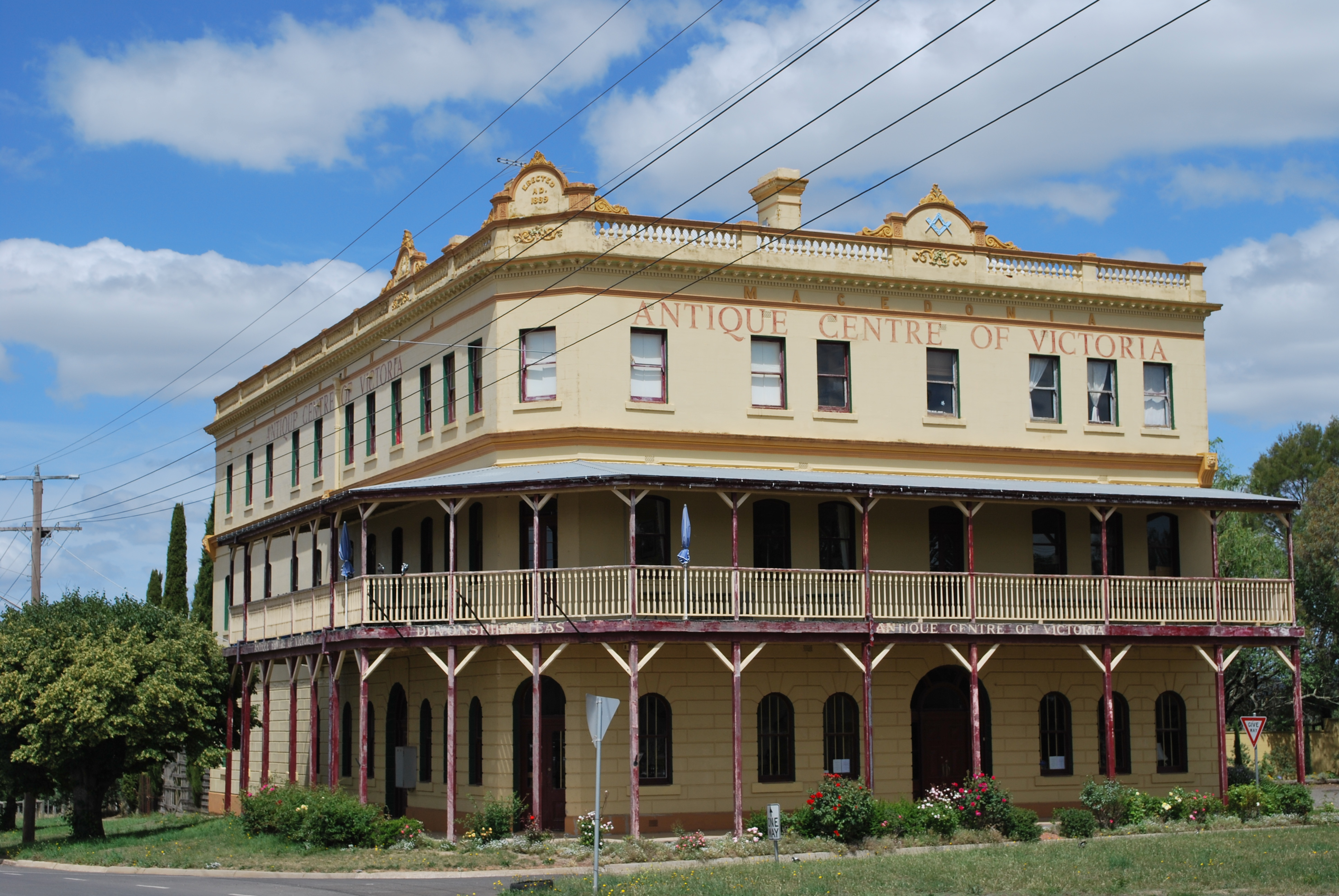
The Antiques Centre, a restored hostel.

Lancefield /ˈlænsfiːld/ is a town in the Shire of Macedon Ranges local government area in Victoria, Australia 69 kilometres (43 mi) north of the state capital, Melbourne, 33.6 km south of Puckapunyal and had a population of at least 2,743 at the 2021 census.

== History ==
The area was used by the indigenous aboriginal people as a quarry site for the manufacture of stone axes and was first settled by European squatters in 1837. The main source of these stone tools was at Mount William, to the northeast of Lancefield.

A Lancefield Post Office opened on 16 January 1858 in the Romsey/Five Mile Creek area, 6 kilometres (3.7 mi) to the south. In 1860 this was renamed Five Mile Creek when Lancefield Post Office opened in the present township.

Lancefield's elevation and climate made it a popular summer resort in the 1880s. In recent years, many local wineries have been established in the area.

The town has a connection to the Kelly Gang; for it was here that Constable Fitzpatrick, the instigator of the Kelly Outbreak in 1878 was finally found by the Victorian police to be no good and for his actions was finally discharged from the force.

Lancefield district had a reputation for some of the most fertile soils in Victoria. Prior to being cut up into small blocks during the early 1970s the region produced high yields per acre of potatoes, fat lambs, fat cattle, wheat and other cereal crops.

A large fossil deposit from the Pleistocene epoch was discovered at Lancefield Swamp, containing the remains of many species of extinct megafauna, including; Macropus titan, a giant kangaroo; Diprotodon, a rhinoceros-sized wombat; and Genyornis, a giant flightless bird.

The local Australian rules football team, Lancefield Football Club competes in the Riddell District Football League.

Golfers play at the course of the Lancefield Golf Club on Heddle Road.

== Burke and Wills ==
The Burke and Wills expedition camped at Lancefield on their journey to cross Australia from Melbourne to the Gulf of Carpentaria. They arrived here on 23 August 1860 and made their fourth camp out of Melbourne. A marker at the site of the original town at Mustey's Bridge on Deep Creek commemorates the site of their camp. The route of their departure northwards from the town is commemorated by the road to Mia Mia, which was named 'Burke and Wills Track' in their honour.

== Railway ==
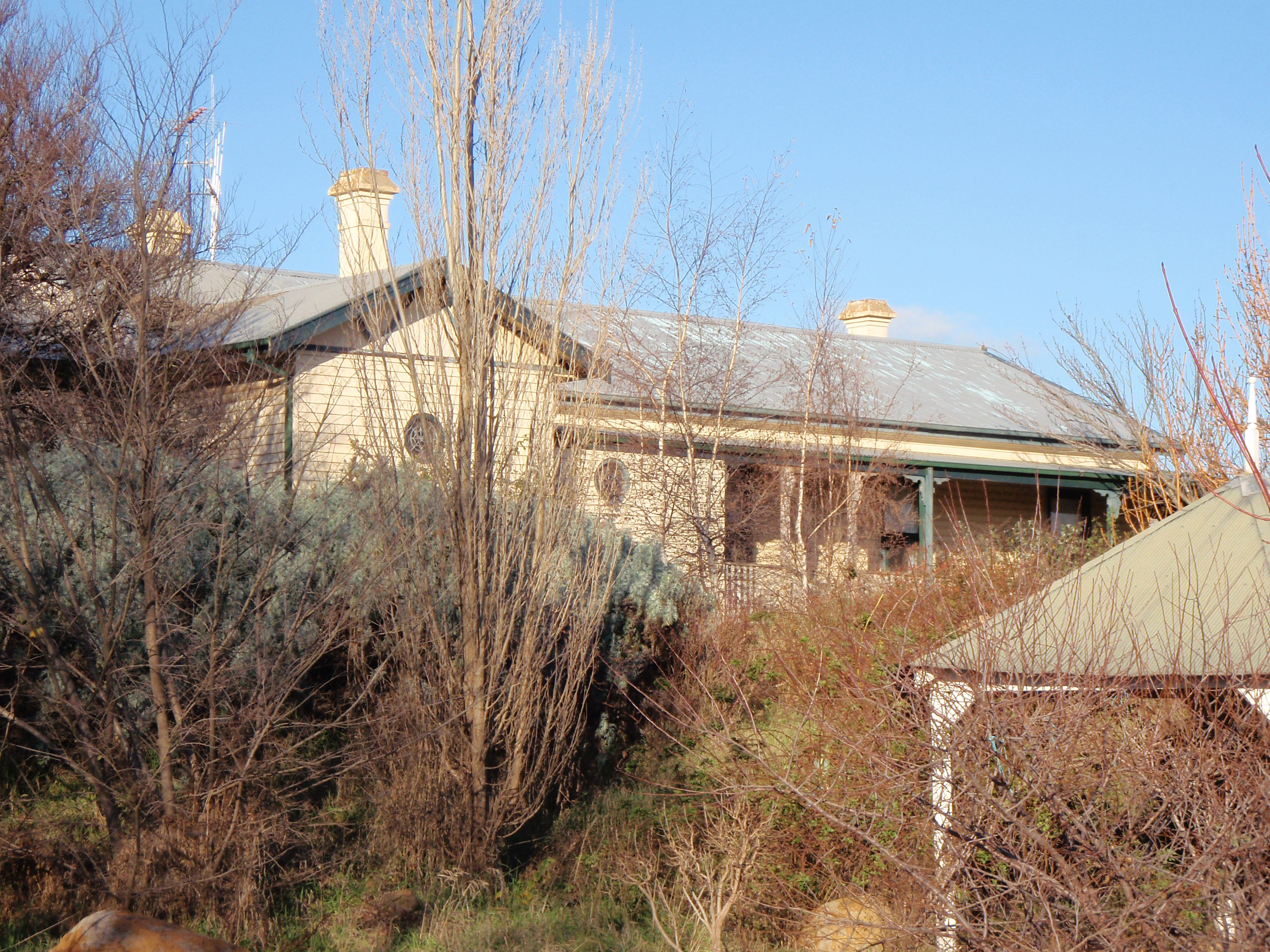
The former Lancefield railway station

A railway branch line off the Melbourne-Bendigo line originated at Clarkefield (known then as Lancefield Junction), opening as far as Lancefield on 6 June 1881. This section of the line was closed on 13 August 1956.

By 6 April 1892, the line was extended out of Lancefield to Kilmore. However, this section of the line was so unsuccessful that it was closed on 1 June 1897.

== Notable people ==
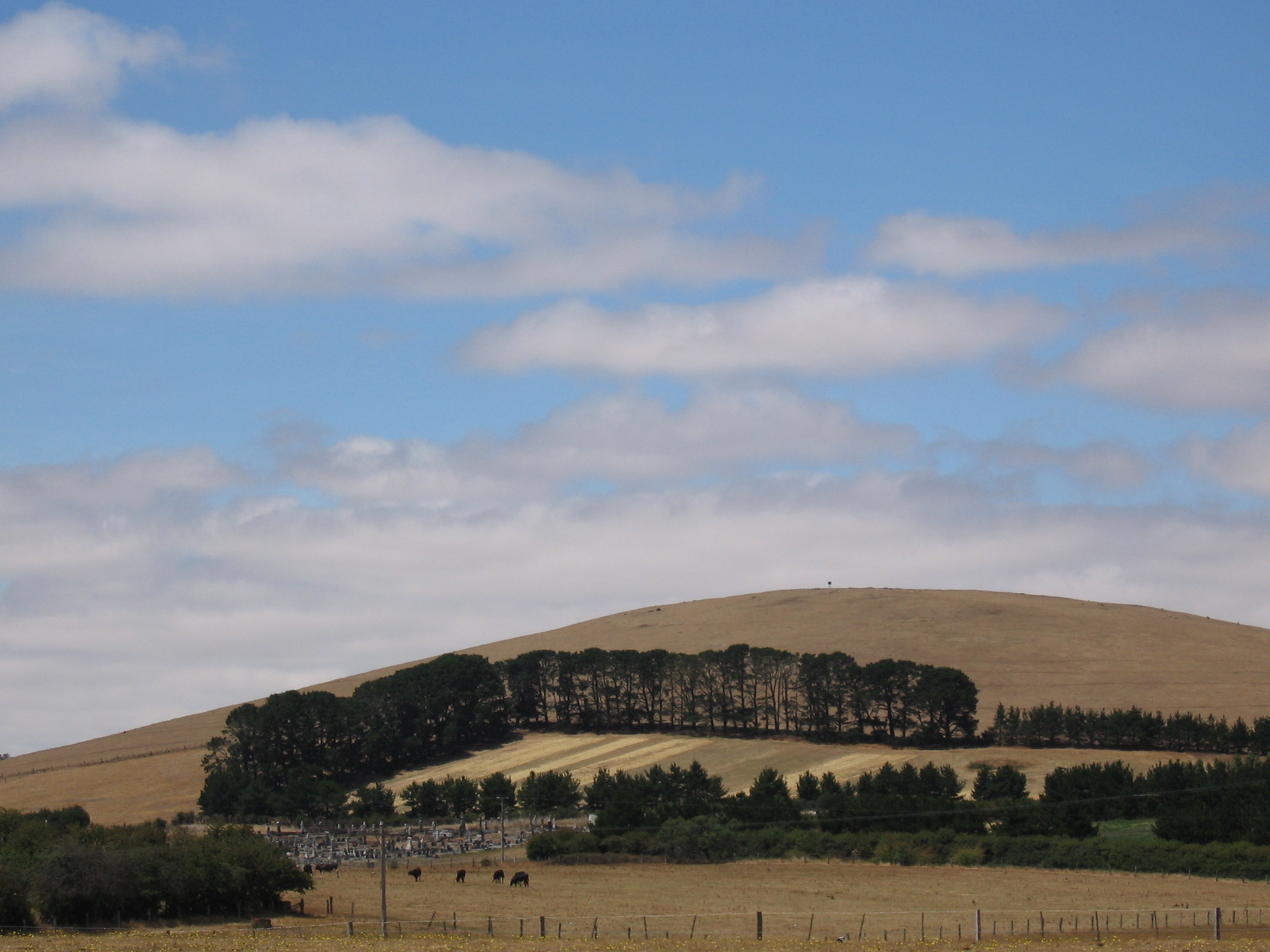
Farmland south of Lancefield: The local cemetery can be seen in the right foreground

- John Allan, the 29th Premier of Victoria, was born near Lancefield in 1866
- Peter J Connors DD DCL, former Catholic Bishop of Ballarat
- Marian Eldridge (née Stockfeld), novelist
- Richard (Rick) Giddings, patrol officer and later magistrate in Papua New Guinea
- Alfred Lockwood, born 9 December 1867, was a journalist and newspaper proprietor
- Eleanor May Moore (1875–1949), feminist and pacifist and member of Women's International League for Peace and Freedom
- Edith Onians OBE, born in Lancefield in 1866, organizer of the Melbourne City Newsboys Society

=== Breaker Morant and Bushveldt Carbineers connection ===
On his release from prison in England in 1904, George Witton came to Lancefield and lived in the town for several years. Witton of the Bushveldt Carbineers was charged along with Breaker Morant and Peter Handcock of murdering captured Boers during the Anglo-Boer War. Witton was found guilty of murder and sentenced to be shot, but this was commuted to life of penal servitude. Morant and Handcock both found guilty and sentenced to be shot were executed in Pretoria on 27 February 1902. Witton (who had never been to England) was sent to England and held in prison until released due to public pressure from Australia. It was to Lancefield that he came in broken health on his return to Australia and wrote his angry book, Scapegoats of the Empire (1907). In the introduction to his book he stated that he was living in Lancefield. When due for publication a fire destroyed all but several copies of the book. In 1982, Angus and Robertson in the United Kingdom re-published the book following the success of the movie Breaker Morant. George Witton's cousin, Cecily Adams of Castlecrag Sydney, owned the copyright for "Scapegoats of the Empire" following George's death. Cecily was also aware of some additional documentation written by George Witton, which he asked not to be released until after his death. Cecily was determined a further edition, which included this additional material, should be published and in 1989 an edition was published by ADLIB BOOKS of Bath, by arrangement with Cecily Adams as the copyright owner and Angus & Robertson (UK).
