= Pastoria East =

Locality in Victoria, Australia

Coordinates: 37.177236°S 144.632628°E

Pastoria East is a locality in Victoria, Australia, made up after the Shire of Kyneton merged with the Shires of Gisborne, Newham and Woodend, and Romsey to make up the Shire of Macedon Ranges.

Many residents wish to get the boundaries of Baynton to be restored to where they once were and thus have the Pastoria East name discontinued as Pastoria East is not technically east of Pastoria.
