= Braemar College =

Braemar College, Woodend

Location
- Woodend, Victoria; Australia; 37°21′47″S 144°34′32″E

Information
- Type: Independent, co-educational
- Motto: Latin: Unum Corpus Multi Sumus (One body, many parts)
- Denomination: Anglican, Catholic and Uniting
- Established: 1975
- Principal: Russell Deer
- Enrolment: Years 5–12
- Colours: Blue and green
- Website: https://www.braemar.vic.edu.au/

Braemar College is an ecumenical co-curricular private school located on Mount Macedon in Woodend, Victoria, Australia. Initially the school's board consisted of representatives from the three local municipalities (Shire of Gisborne, Shire of Romsey and Shire of Newham and Woodend – now replaced by the newer Shire of Macedon Ranges) and the three local Christian denomination churches (Anglican, Catholic and Uniting). The school's motto is Unum Corpus Multi Sumus (One body, many parts).

== Braemar House ==
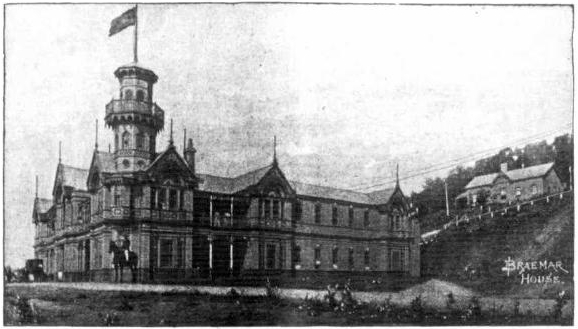
Braemar House, Mt Macedon 1895 - source NLA.

The main building in the college, Braemar House, dates from the late nineteenth century and is believed to be the largest plywood structure in the Southern Hemisphere. Braemar House is a substantial two-storey timber mansion on brick and stone foundations with high pitched roofs, intricate gables and asymmetric features, which was constructed in 1889–90 to a design by Italian-born architect Louis Boldini.

The school's architectural style is classified as Victorian Period (1851–1901) Free Classical.

Braemar House was built as a guest house for affluent Melbourne residents by a consortium of Melbourne businessmen. The location of Braemar House in the Mount Macedon area which was noted for its bracing mountain air made it attractive to those who believed that city life was not conducive to good health and that regular vacations in a healthy environment would restore well being. Access to rail transport and proximity to recreational activities such as walking and climbing in picturesque locations such as nearby Hanging Rock made Woodend a suitable place for such a venture.

Braemar House operated as a guest house from about 1890 until at least 1908, and possibly until 1918 when it was reported sold and that "it is intended to convert the house into a school for young ladies".

Braemar House was listed on the Heritage Register of Victoria in 2003.

== Clyde School ==
Clyde School was founded as a private girls' school in 1910 in St Kilda by Isabel Henderson. In 1919 it moved to Braemar House, Woodend and in 1921 it was transformed into a public school (which was exclusively a boarding school).

In 1976 Clyde School, Geelong Church of England Grammar School, and Geelong Church of England Girls' Grammar School "The Hermitage" amalgamated, and today the combined school continues as Geelong Grammar School.

== Braemar College ==
In 1975 the present name Braemar College was adopted as a new school was started to include years 7 to 12 for both male and female students. Its original principal was Graham Farley.

Braemar College sits surrounded by the ferny undergrowth, Snow Gums, Alpine Ash and Mountain Ash bushland of the Macedon Regional Park. On 16 February 1983, the school escaped relatively unharmed as the infamous Ash Wednesday fires raged around it. The statewide Ash Wednesday Bushfires raged across Victoria – scorching 295 km^{2} of bushland, taking 7 lives and destroying 628 buildings in the Macedon Ranges area alone. Despite the valiant efforts of local firefighters and volunteers, the school did lose its historic stables and grandstand – now the site of a gymnasium and theatre building. The fire that burnt the stables took place on 1 February 1983, a fortnight before the Ash Wednesday fires.

The college again expanded in 1995 with the construction of a primary school building along with full provisions for grade 5 and 6 students.

In 2017, work on the Braemar College Woodend Campus began. The College has timelines in place that will see the Middle School being located at the second campus for the commencement of term 2 of 2018, but because of delays, the Middle School is now been transferred to the second campus at the beginning of the 3rd term. In 2021, the third building on the Woodend campus has been completed.

Braemar College participates in many activities with other schools in the region such as cross country, athletics, swimming, chess, debating and orienteering.

== References in media ==
Clyde School became well known for its depiction in the Joan Lindsay novel Picnic at Hanging Rock (1967). This novel was concerned with an ill-fated excursion to nearby Hanging Rock by girls from the local boarding school.

In 1975 the novel was made into a film directed by Peter Weir which became very successful both in Australia and overseas. At the time of release, the association with Clyde School was noted in the press. The film's producers chose Martindale Hall, in South Australia (with school buildings more typical of a 19th-century English public school than the former alpine chalet styled guesthouse) to stand for the story's fictional school, Appleyard College.

In 1987, the final chapter or sequel to Picnic at Hanging Rock titled The Secret of Hanging Rock, was launched at a media event at Braemar College.

In 1987, The Australian 60 Minutes program televised a debate at the school on the abortion issue featuring students and community figures on either side of the debate (including notorious anti-abortion campaigner Margaret Tighe).
