= Murder of Jill Meagher =

2012 rape and murder in Melbourne, Australia

- Date: 22 September 2012
- Time: c. 1:45 am (disappearance)
- Location: Brunswick, Victoria, Australia
- Cause: Strangulation
- Deaths: Gillian Meagher (née McKeon)
- Burial: Fawkner, Victoria
- Suspects: Adrian Ernest Bayley
- Charges: Rape, murder
- Verdict: Guilty

Gillian "Jill" Meagher (/mɑːr/ MAR; née McKeon) was a 29-year-old Irish woman living in Australia who was raped and murdered while walking home from a pub in Brunswick, an inner suburb of Melbourne, Victoria, in the early hours of 22 September 2012.

Meagher's case was initially classified as that of a missing person, as she had failed to return home to her husband, Tom Meagher. But it soon became a homicide investigation. Her disappearance attracted widespread media attention and a review of closed-circuit television images from the area of her disappearance. Her body was discovered six days later near Gisborne South, about 50 kilometres (31 miles) north from Brunswick.

Adrian Ernest Bayley pleaded guilty to Meagher's rape and murder in April 2013. He was sentenced to life imprisonment with a 35-year non-parole period. His bid to appeal his minimum term, in September 2013, was unsuccessful. In May 2015, Bayley was sentenced to another 18 years and his non-parole period was extended from 35 to 43 years for three other rape convictions. In July 2016, the sentence was reduced to 40 years, deducting three years of the term, making Bayley eligible for parole in 2055.

== Victim ==
Gillian McKeon was born on 30 October 1982 in Drogheda, County Louth, Ireland. She spent her early childhood in Termonfeckin village to the north of Drogheda. The family relocated to Australia when her father, George McKeon, gained a job in Perth. During her time in the city, she attended Bull Creek Primary School and Rossmoyne High School before returning to Ireland with her family in 1996. Back in Ireland, she attended Drogheda Grammar School and St Oliver's Community College in Drogheda before graduating with a Bachelor of Arts degree from University College Dublin. After graduation, she worked for the Irish national broadcaster RTÉ.

Meagher did not formally move to Australia until 2009 after she met and married Tom Meagher in Ireland in 2008. After arriving in Australia, she settled in Melbourne and began working for the Australian Broadcasting Corporation (ABC). She stayed in touch with her parents who were by then living again in Perth, Western Australia. In September 2012, she had come back to Melbourne after visiting her parents when her father had a bout of ill health.

Meagher worked for the ABC in an administrative and occasional on-air role at ABC Radio Melbourne.

== Disappearance ==
After work on 21 September 2012, Meagher went with co-workers from ABC Melbourne to the Brunswick Green bar on Sydney Road, Brunswick, later moving to Bar Etiquette (also on Sydney Road and now closed). She left the bar at around 1:30 am and began the short walk back to the home she shared with her husband.

While walking home, Meagher called her brother, Michael McKeon, and spoke with him briefly about their father. At their flat, her husband woke to realise she was not home and started searching for her. When she could not be found or contacted by phone, he contacted the police.

In the days after she went missing, Meagher's ABC colleagues used Twitter to help in the search for her. A Facebook page, "Help us Find Jill Meagher" (now defunct), was started on 23 September in the hope of finding her alive. A poster campaign was also launched. By 27 September, five days after her disappearance, the Facebook page had received over 100,000 "likes". The public soon became aware of the search, primarily through the growing number of media reports and the Facebook page.

On 24 September, Meagher's handbag was found by police in a laneway near Hope Street, Brunswick. This was close to where she lived. Police were suspicious as to how it came to be there because the area had previously been searched by them.

On 25 September, closed-circuit television (CCTV) video was handed to and then released by Victoria Police. The video was provided to them by an employee of the Duchess Boutique, a bridal shop based on Sydney Road near Hope Street. It had been recorded from within the shop but had a limited view of the street through its front windows. It showed her speaking to a man in a blue hoodie at around 1:42 am on the night she disappeared. At one point she brandishes her mobile phone at him. The man had also been filmed walking outside the shop four minutes earlier. This was the last known time that Meagher was captured on camera.

== Investigation, arrest, guilty plea and other legal consequences ==
Adrian Ernest Bayley
- Born: Adrian Ernest Edwards; 14 July 1971 (age 55)
- Occupations: Pastry cook, Tradesman
- Status: Imprisoned
- Conviction: Guilty
- Criminal charges: Rape, murder
- Penalty: Life imprisonment with a non-parole period of 40 years (parole eligible 2055)

=== Adrian Ernest Bayley ===
The police investigation was assisted by the CCTV video from the Duchess Boutique as well as CCTV video taken elsewhere and monitoring the movements of Meagher's mobile phone.

The homicide squad had taken over the case on 24 September. Prior to receiving the CCTV video from the Duchess Boutique on 25 September, they had thoroughly searched the Meaghers' flat and took away some possessions, including their car, for testing. After receiving the video, attention switched to looking for the man in the blue hoodie, though a second search of the Meaghers' flat took place on the evening of 25 September, with more items removed for testing.

At about 2:30 pm on 27 September, police arrested Adrian Ernest Bayley, then 41, at his address in Coburg, and then questioned him at great length. It transpired that he had been the man in the blue hoodie. During the interrogation, Bayley ended up breaking down and admitting that he had strangled her with his hands in a lane off Hope Street, Brunswick. He had then buried her.

At around 10:00 pm on 27 September, Bayley led police to where Meagher's body was buried in a shallow grave on Black Hill Road near Gisborne South. She had been strangled after being raped.

Bayley was charged with rape and murder at about 2:00 am on 28 September and, followed by an out-of-sessions hearing at 3:00 am that lasted for about 90 seconds, was held on remand to await trial. While in custody, he attempted suicide.

Bayley's arrest and the finding and exhumation of Meagher's body generated considerable media and public response, especially when it was soon revealed that Bayley was already on parole for a series of sexual offences. At a pre-committal hearing in January 2013 a two-day committal case in the Melbourne Magistrates Court was scheduled to begin on 12 March 2013. According to news reports at the time, Bayley intended to fight the charges. On 5 April 2013, he pleaded guilty to the rape and murder of Meagher. On 26 April 2013, he pleaded not guilty to a number of other sexual assaults in Melbourne dating back to 2000. Bayley appeared in court on 11 June 2013 for a pre-sentencing hearing.

On the date of the pre-sentencing hearing, a suppression order was also lifted by Justice Geoffrey Nettle allowing Bayley's "extensive history of rape and violence" to be revealed and these also generated headlines.

On 19 June 2013, in front of a packed public gallery at the Victorian Supreme Court, Bayley was sentenced by Justice Nettle to life imprisonment with a non-parole period of 35 years.

In September 2013, Bayley lodged an appeal against his sentence through Victorian Legal Aid. The appeal argued that the minimum sentence was too long and that he had not taken "perverted pleasure" in murdering Meagher as stated by Justice Nettle. On 26 September 2013, the appeal was dismissed in less than 10 minutes after "hearing argument from counsel on both sides over [approximately one and a half hours]" "during the days beforehand".

By March 2015, Bayley had been found guilty of three more rapes, committed before he killed Meagher, in three separate trials held in 2014 and 2015. The victims, two sex workers and a Dutch backpacker, came forward due to the high level of publicity over Meagher's rape and murder. He had by then been convicted of sexual crimes against 12 people.

Later, in May 2015, Bayley was sentenced to another 18 years by County Court judge Sue Pullen, and his non-parole period was extended from 35 to 43 years.

On 25 June 2015, Bayley lodged an appeal against two of the three convictions and the extended non-parole period received in May 2015.

In July 2016, Bayley lodged an appeal against one rape conviction and was a given three-year reduction to his sentence, making him eligible for parole in 2055, aged 83.

Bayley's lawyer told the court that Bayley had been diagnosed with borderline personality disorder and alcohol dependence. It was also said that he had been physically abused by his father and sexually abused by an older female relative.

=== Other legal consequences ===
==== Social media ====
After Bayley had been charged with rape and murder in September 2012, Facebook users created pages about the case, some of which were openly hostile to Bayley. Victoria Police tried, initially unsuccessfully, to have these pages removed. As a result of the social media response the Premier of Victoria, Ted Baillieu, suggested that law reform might be necessary to avoid social media coverage prejudicing the jury pool.

The role of social media in cases such as Meagher's death remains a matter of concern in legal circles.

==== Parole laws ====
By late June 2013, there was a substantial tightening of Victoria's parole laws, which came about as the direct result of women such as Meagher being attacked and killed by parolees. For example, if parole is breached, then penalties of up to three months imprisonment and a fine of up to $4200 can result. Police can now formally take action if a parolee breaches parole and violent offenders would automatically go back to jail if the breach was a serious one.

Then-Premier of Victoria, Denis Napthine, commented in June 2013: "There is no doubt the system failed Jill Meagher. Under the changes we've already introduced, the offender would have been back in jail, not on the streets. Our actions are the minimum we can do to try and make sure this never ever happens again."

In August 2013, former High Court justice Ian Callinan recommended 23 more changes to the Victorian parole system.

==== DNA database management ====
In March 2015, the DNA system used by Victoria Police came under criticism. In particular, it is unclear why Bayley's DNA, obtained for sexually assaulting another woman in 2001, was not on the Victoria Police's DNA database.

==== Other ====
In April 2015, plans by the Victorian Coroner to hold an inquest into Meagher's death were dropped. This was welcomed by the Meagher family, who said they had wanted closure on the matter.

== Public reaction ==
The public reaction to Meagher's disappearance and the discovery of her body was immense.

=== Prison Mass ===
An early indication of the reaction were media reports of 40 prison inmates at the Metropolitan Remand Centre attending a Requiem Mass for Meagher led by the prison's chaplain, Father Joe Caddy, on 28 September. This had happened shortly after Bayley's arrival at the Metropolitan Assessment Prison in Spencer Street, Melbourne.

=== Reaction by ABC colleagues ===
On 28 September, shortly after the discovery of Meagher's body, an Australian flag and an ABC flag at the Southbank studios were lowered to half-mast for the day.

A statement on Meagher was also placed on the ABC website. In part, it read "Jill was a much loved member of the Local Radio family. She was witty, intelligent and great company. Her friends and workmates at the ABC will miss her greatly. This tragic outcome will undoubtedly weigh heavily on them, and they will be supported through this dark time. We thank the police for their dedication to the investigation and our colleagues in the media for their support. We would also [like to] thank our listeners and the general public for their overwhelming kindness and encouragement over the past week."

=== Social media reaction ===
Many thousands of comments of public grief and sympathy, as well as ones aggressive to Bayley, appeared on social media outlets such as Facebook and Twitter. Around 600 messages of condolence appeared on the "Help Us Find Jill Meagher" Facebook page in just one day (28 September) and it has been said that on that same day around 12 million Twitter timelines referred to Meagher.

=== Flowers and vigils ===
Thousands of flower bouquets began to appear at numerous locations associated with Meagher, most notably outside the Duchess Boutique and the nearby Brunswick Baptist Church, the latter being near the scene of her disappearance. (Meagher was a Roman Catholic.) Other locations included her home address in Brunswick and the spot at Gisborne South where she had been buried by Bayley. Some of these bouquets appeared there during the time that Meagher went missing, but their numbers increased sharply following the news of the discovery of her body on 28 September. When authorities began to dismantle the floral tributes, it became a media story. Numerous chalk messages were also left on the footpaths in the vicinity where Meagher had vanished. A candlelight vigil was also held at the Brunswick Baptist Church.

=== Mistaken identity ===
Shortly after Bayley's arrest, an Andrew Bayley of Coburg, whose name (listed as A. Bayley), address and telephone number were in the White Pages, began receiving abusive phone calls from people believing him to be Adrian Bayley. He also had enquiries from the Irish media. This eventually ceased following publicity on his plight.

=== Memorial marches ===
A public march, organised by Melbourne photographer Phillip Werner, took place on 30 September 2012, two days after the discovery and recovery of Meagher's body. Approximately 30,000 people walked along Sydney Road in her memory. The march also symbolised broader concerns about violence against women, with ensuing discussion on current issues websites. Afterwards, Edith McKeon, Jill Meagher's mother, publicly thanked the Melbourne community for its support.

Another march in reaction to Meagher's death, sometimes confused with Werner's, took place on 20 October 2012. This was organised by the Reclaim the Night movement and involved approximately 3000 people.

=== Funeral, cremation and memorial services ===
In a media statement, Meagher's family again thanked the public for its support. They also asked that the public respect their privacy at the funeral service and cremation, which took place at Melbourne's Fawkner Memorial Park on 4 October 2012. The cemetery was locked for the day, with only invited guests allowed in. The guests included police officers and ABC colleagues.

In Meagher's home town of Drogheda, an informal memorial service was held at St Oliver's Community College on 28 September 2012. Thousands were said to have attended.

A formal memorial Mass was held for Meagher at St Peter's Church in Drogheda on 5 October 2012 shortly after her funeral and cremation in Melbourne.

Another smaller memorial service was held at St Dominic's Park in Drogheda on 21 October 2012. A tree was dedicated to her memory and a poem written by Meagher, "Dedication to a friend", was read.

=== Political comment ===
The public reaction attracted attention and comment in both the Victorian and federal parliaments. For example, the Federal Member for Wills (which currently takes in Brunswick) referred to Meagher in statements in federal parliament, the first of which was on 1 November 2012. In Victorian Parliament, threnodies for Meagher were made by the then Premier, Opposition Leader and Minister for Police and Emergency Services on 9 October 2012 and by Jane Garrett, State Member for Brunswick on 10 October 2012.

On 19 November 2012, a community safety forum over Meagher was held at the Brunswick Town Hall. It was hosted by both the State Member for Brunswick and the Federal Member for Wills. A statement delivered in the Victorian parliament on 27 November indicated that it had been attended by 170 people, it had begun with a moment's silence for Meagher and a series of presentations by representatives of organisations such as Victoria Police and White Ribbon took place, with significant time set aside for any questions or comments.

=== Legacy Australia condolence book ===
A condolence book for Meagher has been set up on the Legacy Australia website by the Herald Sun newspaper. As of July 2015 it has attracted nearly 3000 entries, many from people who have stated that they had never met Meagher.

== Aftermath ==
Meagher's death continued to generate news stories well after her death.

=== White Ribbon ===
Meagher's widower, Tom Meagher, left Melbourne and returned to his home town of Cabinteely, Ireland, in August 2013. He briefly returned to Australia in November 2014 to promote the White Ribbon movement – a campaign to stop violence against women. In an interview with the Irish Echo at about this time, he said that since his wife's death he reads daily from the writings of Maya Angelou.

On 17 April 2014, Tom Meagher wrote an essay on the White Ribbon website, "The Danger of the Monster Myth", about public stereotypes of rapists.

=== Meagher's family ===
Meagher's father, George McKeon, attracted headlines in 2013 about financial and health problems he was experiencing.

=== Anniversaries ===
A follow-up march to the one of September 2012, also organised by Phillip Werner and which marked the anniversary of Meagher's death, took place on 29 September 2013. The turnout was smaller than in 2012 but many thousands still participated.

Anniversaries of Meagher's death have also created news headlines and media statements.

=== Police presentation ===
In November 2013, there was controversy when a Victoria Police detective senior sergeant showed a photograph of Meagher's semi-naked body in her gravesite near Gisborne South to a large audience at a Prostate Cancer Foundation of Australia fundraiser as part of an hour-long talk on homicide. It later emerged that he had also done this several times on previous occasions. A police apology was issued later for the "unfortunate error" and the Premier of Victoria at the time, Denis Napthine, also intervened with criticism and an apology. The detective himself apologised and stated that displaying the photograph had the support of the Meagher family and that the photograph had been displayed very briefly.

=== Derryn Hinch ===
On 17 January 2014, the Australian TV and radio presenter Derryn Hinch began serving a 50-day prison sentence for breaching the suppression order which was in effect at the time of Adrian Bayley's sentencing in 2013. Hinch had attempted to reveal Bayley's extensive record of prior rapes and other violent offences.

== Memorials ==
As early as 1 October 2012, there have been suggestions for a memorial to Meagher to be erected by the Moreland City Council (which takes in Brunswick). Similarly, there were calls in Drogheda to name a building after her. Nothing has happened to date in this regard. Some unofficial memorials, however, have been set up.

A stonemason placed an engraved 50 kilogram granite slab and memorial plaque at the Black Hill Road, Gisborne South site where Meagher's body was found. The Melton City Council later removed the memorial "with the permission of the family and in consideration of the Black Hill Road community". The council said that local residents were upset over the continuing attention and concerned it was attracting too much traffic. It was, however, a controversial move as other local residents had been tending the site.

A street art memorial called "RIP Jill" was created in Hosier Lane, Melbourne, by an unknown artist in September 2012. In early November 2012 the 20-metre mural was painted almost completely over by other street artists. The Lord Mayor of Melbourne, Robert Doyle, said that "The street art community painted the original message and have now painted over it. Personally I would have preferred just the name Jill to remain as a more permanent gesture but that is obviously no longer possible." Of the transient nature of such works, the Premier of Victoria, Ted Baillieu, said that "The tribute to Jill Meagher was created very much in the spirit of Hosier Lane, an iconic part of Melbourne, and no doubt that will continue."

A large daffodil bed was planted and dedicated to her memory in Drogheda's outskirts at the same time her memorial Mass was held in 2012. There have also been reports of Meagher's former colleagues at the ABC planting a flower garden in her memory a year after her death. It was located on the rooftop at the ABC studios at Southbank.

== See also ==
- List of solved missing person cases: post–2000
