= Macedon Ranges =

Mountain range in Victoria, Australia

The Macedon Ranges is a region in Central Victoria, known for its expansive native forests, vibrant arts scene, thriving food and wine industries (including weekly farmers' markets) and natural attractions such as Hanging Rock and Mount Macedon. It is located in between the cities of Bendigo and Melbourne. It includes the towns of Clarkefield, Gisborne South, Gisborne, Kyneton, Lancefield, Macedon, Malmsbury, Mount Macedon, New Gisborne, Riddells Creek, Romsey and Woodend. It is governed and administered by the Macedon Ranges Shire Council.

== Population ==
At the 2016 Census, the region had a population of 46,100. The median age of people in Macedon Ranges is 42 years, and the most common ancestries were English 29.1% Australian 28.8%, and Irish 10.6%. The majority of the region's residents were professionals, with education and medicine/allied health being the most cited professions.

The region has, per capita, more working artists than anywhere else in Victoria.

Macedon Ranges was one of the highest-rated areas in Australia in the Quality of Life Index 2008, and was the highest rated in Victoria (outside Melbourne), ranking 13th of 590 Australian local government areas.

About 35 per cent of people who live in Macedon Ranges live outside a town boundary in a rural setting, preferring to live sustainably through the use of rainwater, solar panels and home-grown vegetables, fruit and eggs.

== Geography ==
The Macedon Ranges is characterized by dramatic undulating landscapes, expansive forests and granite-strewn pastoral vistas. Much of the region is designated as National Park and protected from development. National Parks in the region include Hanging Rock Reserve, Wombat State Forest, Macedon Regional Park and Black Hill Reserve.

The region covers an area of 1,747 square kilometres (675 sq mi). The highest peak in the region is Mount Macedon's Camel's Hump, which is often covered in snow in winter due to its high elevation (1,011 metres or 3,317 ft). The area experiences colder winters and hotter summers than the state capital Melbourne.

== History ==
The original inhabitants of the Macedon Ranges are the Kulin nation - specifically, the Wurundjeri, Dja Dja Wurrrung and Taungurung people, who have lived there continually for at least 26,000 years. The Kulin lived by fishing and domestical agricultural practices, making a sustainable living from the rich natural environment. Their communities are still active today.

Europeans arrived around 1834 when explorer John Aitken came to the area now known as Gisborne, bringing merino sheep to the area from Tasmania. Many pastoralists followed Aitken's lead and began arriving from both Tasmania and New South Wales. Early interactions between Kulin Aboriginal people and European settlers were mixed: while there were reports of cooperation between the groups, there were also several massacres of Aboriginal people reported in the 1830s and 40s.

In the 1850s, gold was discovered north of the Macedon Ranges in the areas now known as Castlemaine, Ballarat and Bendigo in the Victorian Goldfields. As the Macedon Ranges is located between the state capital Melbourne and the Goldfields, Middle Gully, now Macedon, became a hub of activity and provided inns, beer houses, coffee tents, blacksmiths’ forges and stores for the crowds of gold miners.

The gold rush of the 1850s–1870s ensured that the area continued to flourish, and the construction of the railway between Melbourne and Bendigo from 1858 to 1862 brought many new residents to the region.

Throughout the late 19th and early 20th century, Melbourne's wealthy social elite began to settle the area in earnest due to large blocks of land on the south side of Mount Macedon being released to them by the government. As a result, many grand Victorian homes with extensive ornamental gardens were established as summer residences. The proliferation of historic gardens and iconic architecture helped make the region a popular destination for holiday houses and tourists - a designation which remains today.

== Today ==
In recent years, the region's popularity has soared to new heights: proximity to Melbourne, boutique bed and breakfast accommodation, burgeoning food and wine industries and thriving arts scene have made the region highly sought after, drawing tourists but also large numbers of new residents, making the local population growth rate among the fastest in regional Victoria. In fact, the towns of Gisborne and Woodend saw increases in property prices of 14.91% and 21% in 2019 respectively, while property prices in the rest of Australia were in free fall. Locals, worried about the environmental and cultural impacts of this growing popularity, successfully campaigned for new planning controls to protect the character of the region.

A number of media reports have made reference to the influx of young professionals, artists and 'hipsters' to the region, drawn by the region's natural environment, proximity to the city and access to city-style cafes and restaurants.

== Film and television ==
The region's iconic landscapes and its proximity to Melbourne have made it a destination for film and television production.

Macedon was depicted in Picnic at Hanging Rock, the 1975 mystery movie based on the novel of the same name.

Scenes in Where the Wild Things Are were filmed in the forest surrounding Mount Macedon.

The 2009 Nicolas Cage film Knowing was shot in Macedon and nearby in Mount Macedon.

== Transport ==
The towns of the Macedon Ranges are easily accessible from Melbourne's CBD via the Calder Highway and the Bendigo railway line.

== Education ==
Most of the towns in the region have at least one local government primary school, including some of the most elite government schools in Victoria. Candlebark Primary School and Alice Miller High School (both of whose principal was John Marsden, renowned Australian author and educator) provide alternative education options. Secondary school options include Braemar College east of Woodend (Ecumenical, co-educational), Kyneton Secondary College, Sacred Heart College (Catholic), and Gisborne Secondary College.

== Notable residents ==
- John Curtin – 14th Prime Minister of Australia
- Frederick McCubbin – painter
- Carl Valeri – Australian Soccer Player
- John Marsden – author and educator
- Arthur Streeton – artist
- Lloyd Williams – businessman and racehorse owner
- Jan Skubiszewski – Composer and Record Producer
- Caroline Chisholm – Social Reformer, Philanthropist and early advocate of Universal Suffrage
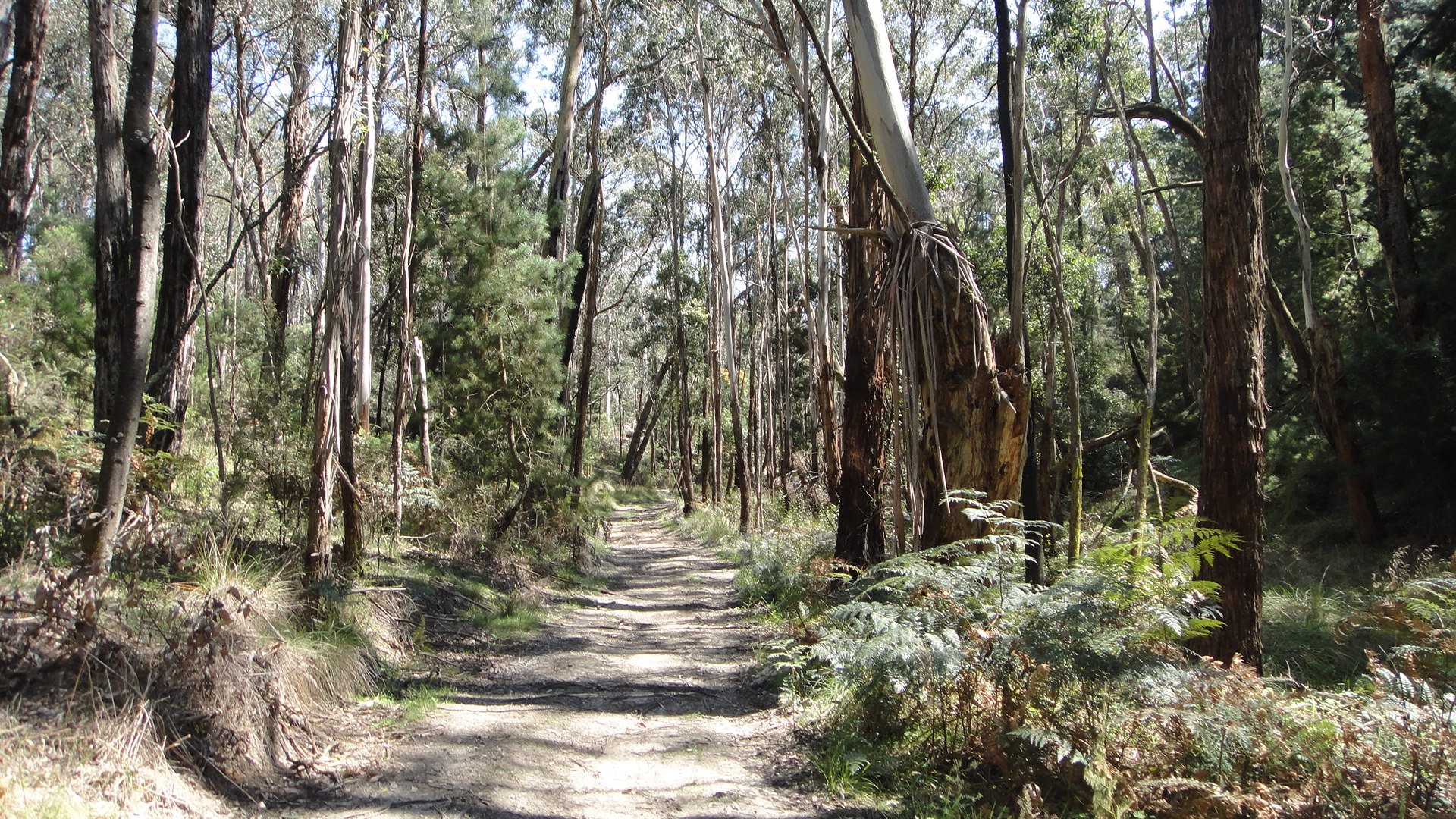
Forest at Mount Macedon

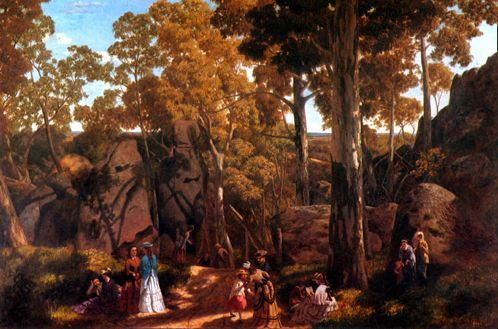
At the Hanging Rock by William Ford, 1875

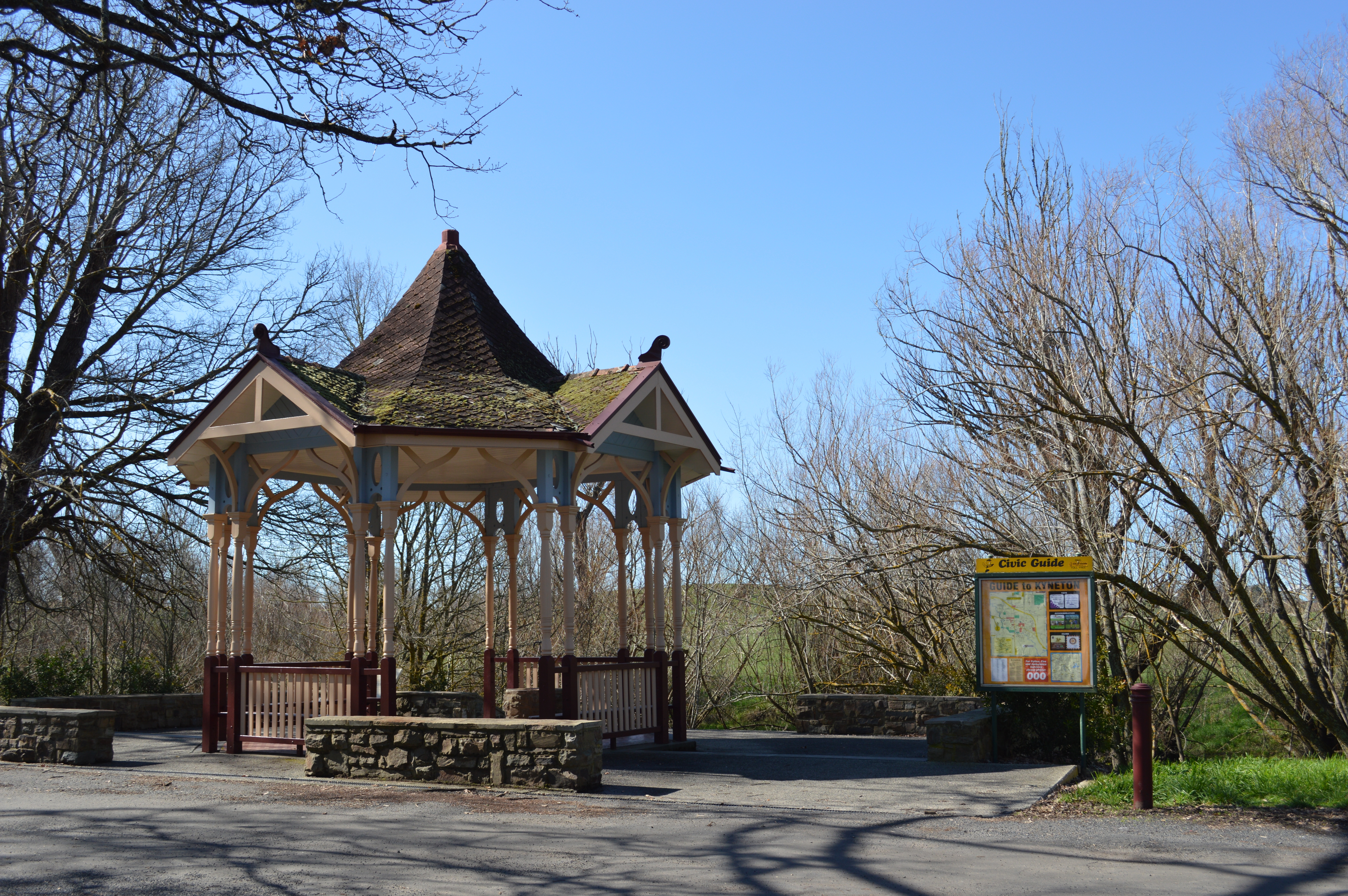
Kyneton Mineral Springs Rotunda

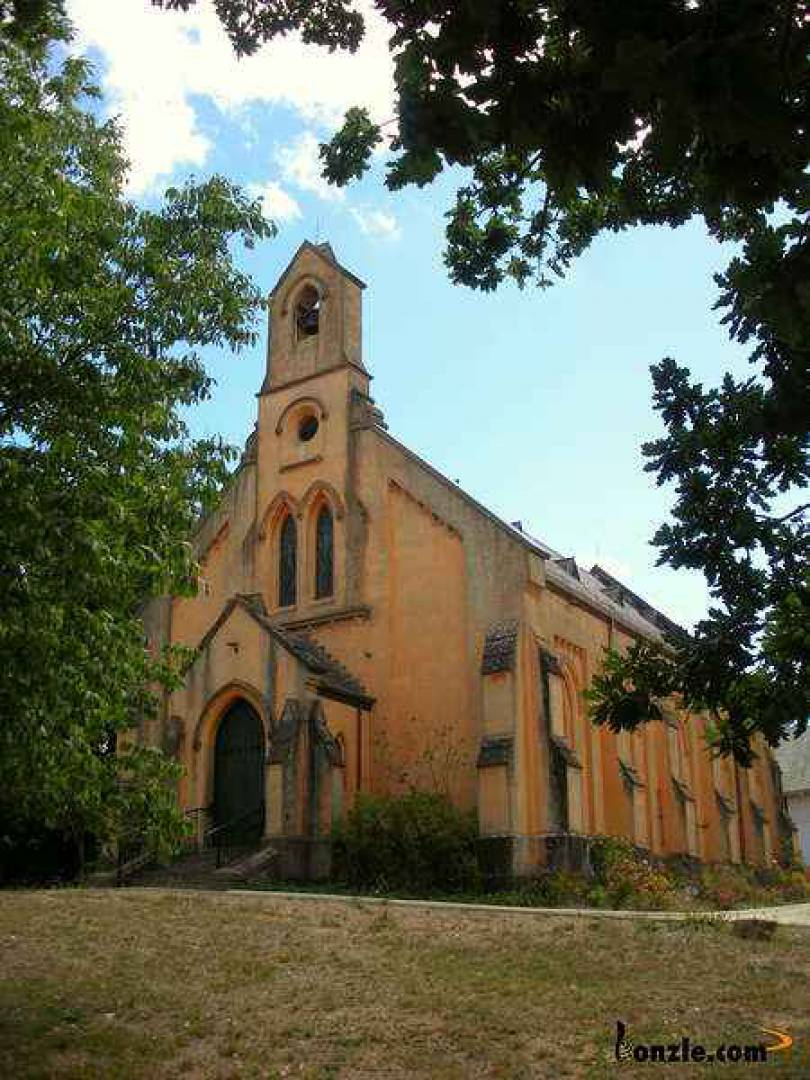
Gisborne Presbyterian Church

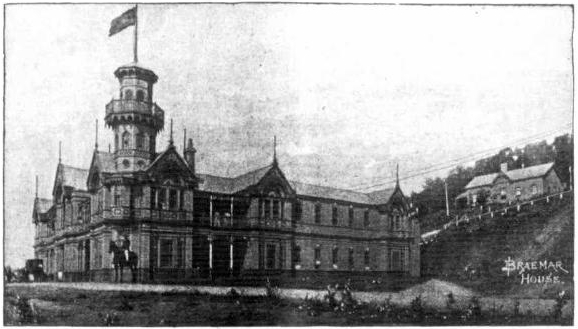
Braemar House Mt Macedon
