= Shire of Kyneton =

Coordinates: 37°14′S 144°27′E

- Local government area
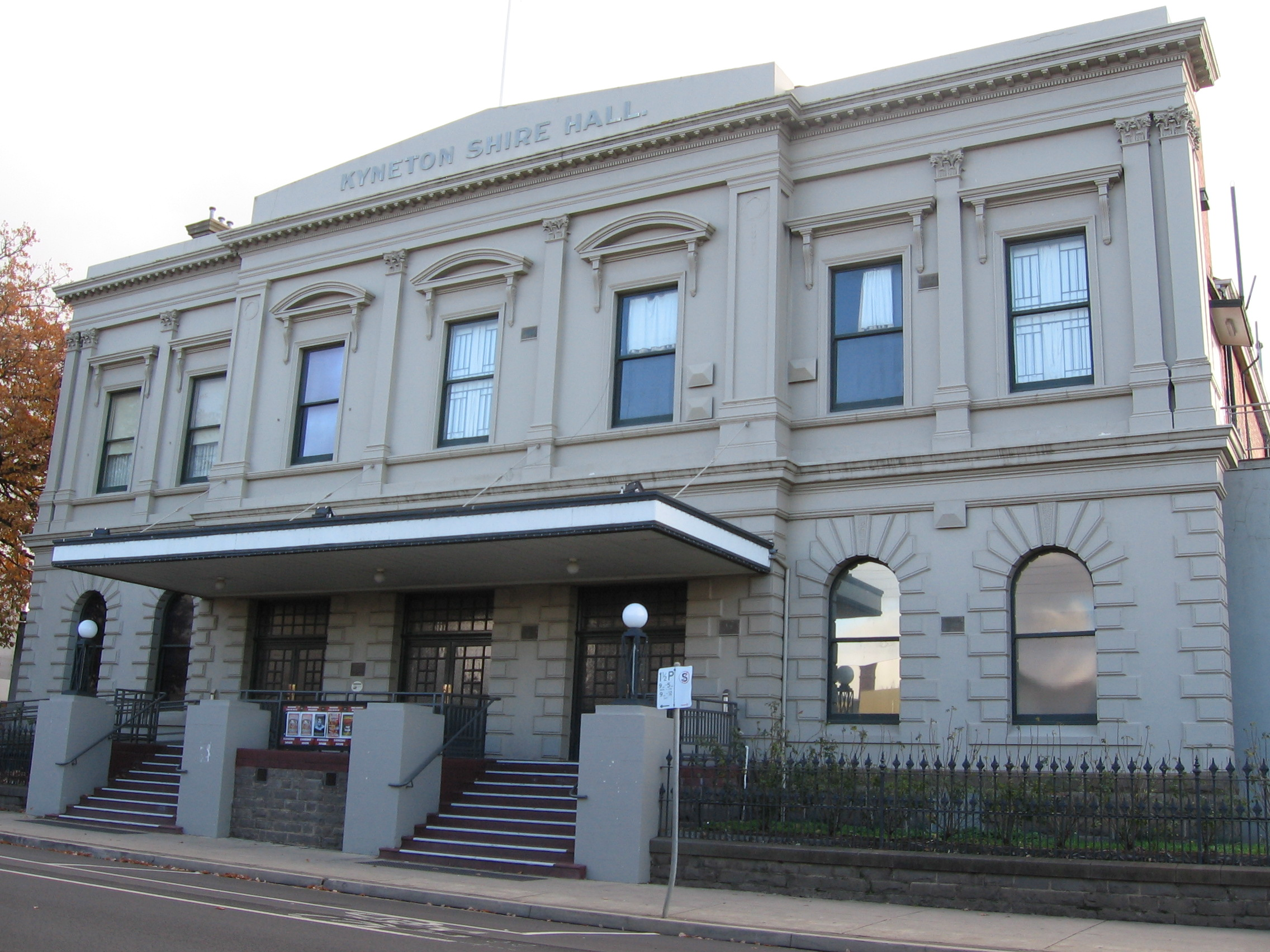
- Shire Hall in Kyneton
- The Shire of Kyneton as at its dissolution in 1995
- Country: Australia
- State: Victoria
- Region: North Central Victoria
- Established: 1859
- Council seat: Kyneton

Area
  - Total: 725.2 km^{2} (280.0 sq mi)

Population
  - Total: 8,920 (1992)
  - Density: 12.300/km^{2} (31.857/sq mi)
- County: Bourke, Dalhousie, Talbot
LGAs around Shire of Kyneton
| Metcalfe | McIvor | Pyalong |
| Daylesford and Glenlyon | Shire of Kyneton | Newham and Woodend |
| Ballan | Bacchus Marsh | Gisborne |

The Shire of Kyneton was a local government area about 85 kilometres (53 mi) northwest of Melbourne, the state capital of Victoria, Australia. The shire covered an area of 725.2 square kilometres (280.0 sq mi), and existed from 1859 until 1995.

== History ==
Kyneton was incorporated as a road district on 8 February 1859, and became a shire on 18 January 1865. Martin McKenna, a brewer, miner, pastoralist and politician, was the first president of the Shire of Kyneton.

On 5 February 1913 and 9 October 1921, it annexed parts of the Shires of Bacchus Marsh and Ballan respectively, while on 1 October 1915, it absorbed the Borough of Malmsbury, which had been created on 19 October 1861 with an area of 17.05 square kilometres (6.58 sq mi).

On 19 January 1995, the Shire of Kyneton was abolished, and along with the Shires of Gisborne, Newham and Woodend and Romsey, was merged into the newly created Shire of Macedon Ranges. A small part of the shire was also transferred to the newly created Hepburn Shire.

== Wards ==
The Shire of Kyneton was divided into four ridings, each of which elected three councillors:

- Kyneton East Riding
- Kyneton West Riding
- Trentham/Tylden Riding
- Carlsruhe/Malmsbury Riding

== Towns and localities ==
- Baynton
- Carlsruhe
- East Trentham
- Edgecombe
- Fern Hill
- Green Hill
- Kyneton*
- Lauriston
- Malmsbury
- Newbury
- Pastoria
- Pastoria East
- Piper's Creek
- Sidonia
- Spring Hill
- Trentham
- Tylden

* Council seat.

== Population ==
| Year | Population |
|---|---|
| 1954 | 6,063 |
| 1958 | 6,340* |
| 1961 | 5,979 |
| 1966 | 5,967 |
| 1971 | 5,959 |
| 1976 | 6,293 |
| 1981 | 6,748 |
| 1986 | 7,657 |
| 1991 | 8,387 |

* Estimate in the 1958 Victorian Year Book.
