= New Gisborne =

- Town
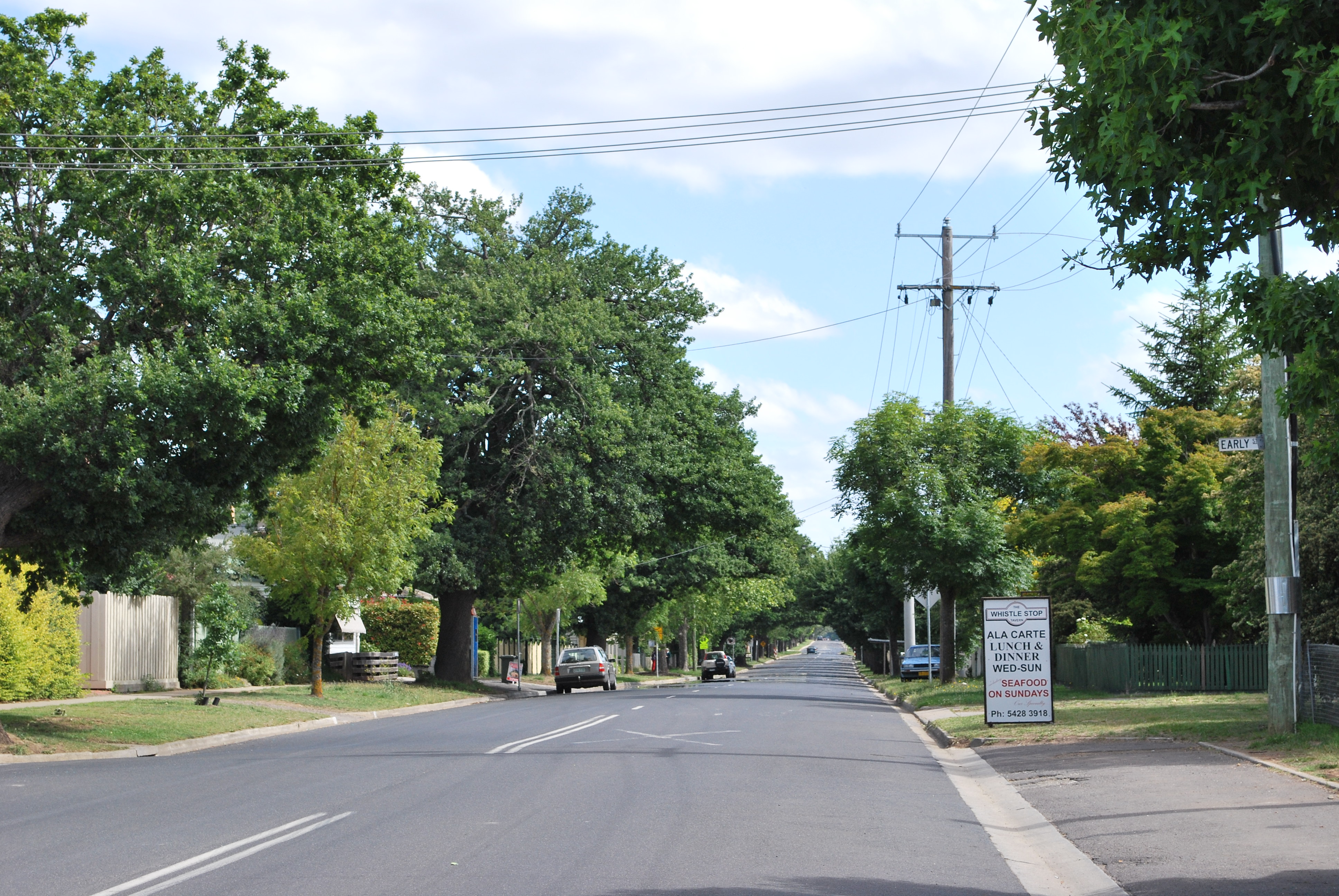
- Main street

- Interactive map of New Gisborne
- Coordinates: 37.459°S 144.598°E
- Country: Australia
- State: Victoria
- LGA: Shire of Macedon Ranges
- Location: 2 km (1.2 mi) from Gisborne; 57 km (35 mi) from Melbourne; 98 km (61 mi) from Bendigo; 83 km (52 mi) from Ballarat

Government
  - State electorate: Macedon
  - Federal division: McEwen
- Elevation: 465 m (1,526 ft)

Population
  - Total: 2,380 (2011 census)
- Postcode: 3438
Localities around New Gisborne
Macedon	Mount Macedon	Riddells Creek
Macedon	New Gisborne	Riddells Creek
Macedon	Gisborne	Gisborne

New Gisborne is a suburb of Gisborne in Victoria, Australia, in the foothills of Mount Macedon in the Shire of Macedon Ranges. The Gisborne railway station on the Bendigo line is located in New Gisborne, and a bus service connects residents of the two towns between the railway station and the Gisborne town centre. At the 2011 census, New Gisborne had a population of 2,380.

New Gisborne is serviced by a variety of community facilities, including a swim centre, netball courts and medical centre.

There are a number of preschools and primary schools in the area including The Gisborne Montessori School, Holy Cross Primary School and New Gisborne Primary School.

The New Gisborne post office opened on 1 September 1861, but closed down on 27 June 1994.
