= Shire of Bacchus Marsh =

Coordinates: 37°41′S 144°26′E

Shire of Bacchus Marsh Victoria
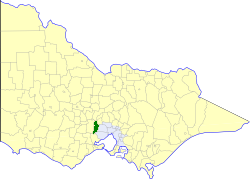
- Location in Victoria
- The Shire of Bacchus Marsh as at its dissolution in 1994
- Population: 12,590 (1992)
  - Density: 22.283/km^{2} (57.71/sq mi)
- Established: 1862
- Area: 565 km^{2} (218.1 sq mi)
- Council seat: Bacchus Marsh
- Region: Grampians
- County: Bourke, Grant
LGAs around Shire of Bacchus Marsh:
Kyneton	Newham & Woodend	Gisborne
Ballan	Shire of Bacchus Marsh	Melton
Ballan	Corio	Werribee

The Shire of Bacchus Marsh was a local government area about 50 kilometres (31 mi) west of Melbourne, the state capital of Victoria, Australia. The shire covered an area of 565 square kilometres (218.1 sq mi), and existed from 1862 until 1994.

== History ==
Bacchus Marsh was first incorporated as a road district on 14 October 1862, and became a shire on 23 January 1871. On 15 March 1911, it annexed part of the Lara Riding of the Shire of Corio, and on 5 February 1921, part of the shire was annexed to the Shire of Kyneton.

On 15 December 1994, the Shire of Bacchus Marsh was abolished, and along with the Shire of Ballan, was merged into the Shire of Moorabool, which was created earlier in May 1994 after the merger of the Shire of Bungaree and parts of the Shire of Buninyong.

== Wards ==
The Shire of Bacchus Marsh was divided into four ridings in 1975, each of which elected three councillors:

- Bacchus Riding
- Coimadai Riding
- Parwan Riding
- Pentland Riding

== Towns and localities ==
- Bacchus Marsh*
- Balliang
- Coimadai
- Darley
- Hopetoun Park
- Korobeit
- Maddingley
- Myrniong
- Parwan
- Rowsley

* Council seat.

== Population ==
Year	Population
1954	3,972
1958	4,290*
1961	4,411
1966	4,690
1971	5,083
1976	6,052
1981	7,513
1986	9,342
1991	11,854

* Estimate in 1958 Victorian Year Book.
