= Gisborne Secondary College =

Coordinates: 37.4985°S 144.5849°E

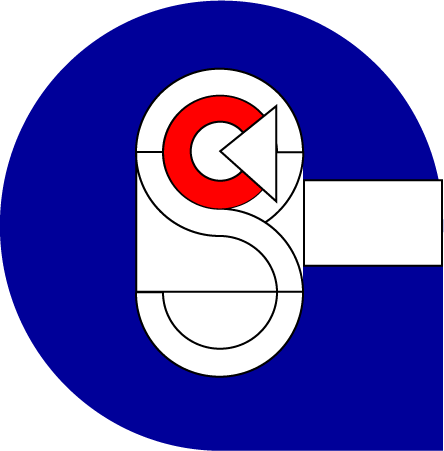

Location
- Melton Road; Gisborne, Victoria 3437; Australia

Information
- Type: State government secondary school
- Established: 1981
- Principal: Sarah Rose
- Staff: 137
- Enrolment: 1,071 (7–12)
- Houses: Barcham, Bennett, Bishop, Cherry, Dixon, MacDonald, Ross-Watt, Wurundjeri
- Colours: Red, white and blue
- Slogan: Respect, Diversity, Innovation, Achievement
- Website: www.gisbornesc.vic.edu.au

Gisborne Secondary College is a co-educational secondary school located in Gisborne, Victoria, established in 1981. The current enrolment is 1071 students. Students attend from years seven to twelve. The college serves a large proportion of the southern Macedon Ranges district in Victoria, with over 800 students attending school via school bus. The College has a large range of subject offerings, including electives from Year 9 onwards, and at the Senior School, VCE, VCE-VM, and VET programs.

== Learning centres ==
Students in years 7 and 8 are educated in two learning centres. Students attend their core classes in the learning centres, but use specialist classrooms for technology, health and physical education, music, drama and some science classes. Each learning centre has a leader (Coordinator) and a core group of teachers who each teach half of the students in their specialist subject area.

== Senior school ==
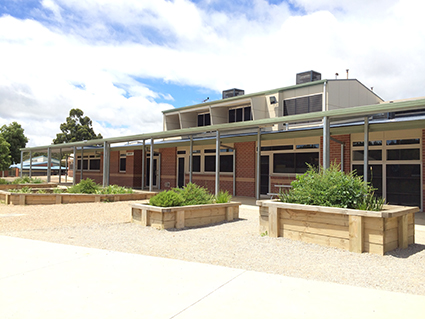
Gisborne SC Library, constructed in 2011.

The senior school starts in year 10, and students can elect to study through a number of pathways to reach a senior school qualification. Students study towards the Victorian Certificate of Education (VCE), the Victorian Certificate of Applied Learning (VCAL), as well as Vocational Education and Training in Schools (VETiS) programs and School-based Apprenticeships and Traineeships.

The VCE, which is the main secondary student assessment program in Victoria, ranks students with an Australian Tertiary Admission Rank (ATAR) for university entrance purposes.

== Performing arts ==
The college has achieved some success in performing arts across Victoria in recent years, including prizes for the Rock Eisteddfod Challenge:

- First Place – 2011 – Melbourne Raw Division grand final results
- Second Place – 2007 – Open Division
- Third Place – 2004 – Melbourne Grand Final, Premier Division
- First Place – 2002 – Melbourne Grand Final, Open Division

The college also achieved five awards for the 2013 Wakakirri Secondary School Story Dance Challenge (Victoria), including:

- Best Overall Costume Design
- Best Individual Piece Of Set
- Best Lighting Design
- Best Singing Performance
- Best Individual Costume Design (Nomination)

== Notable alumni ==
Australian representative athlete Troy de Haas attended the school from 1992 to 1998. Members of the musical group Stonefield attended the school when they won the 2010 Triple J Unearthed High competition.

- Maddy Prespakis
- Brent Reilly

== See also ==
- List of schools in Victoria
- Victorian Certificate of Education
