= Gisborne South =

- Town
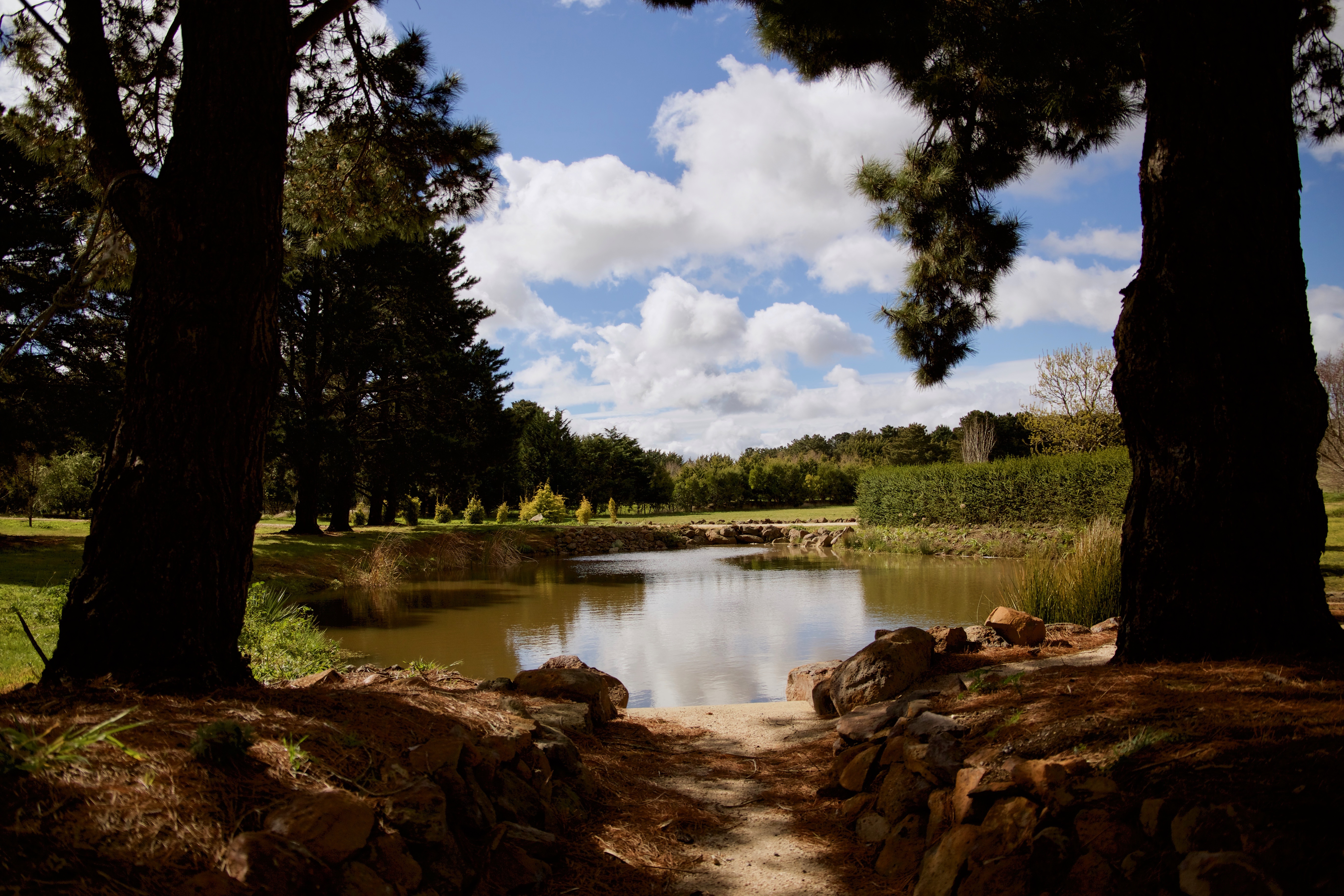
- Typical property in Gisborne South

- Interactive map of Gisborne South
- Coordinates: 37°32′19″S 144°36′23″E
- Country: Australia
- State: Victoria
- LGA: Shire of Macedon Ranges

Government
  - State electorate: Macedon
  - Federal division: McEwen
- Elevation: 443 m (1,453 ft)

Population
  - Total: 854 (SAL 2021)
- Postcode: 3437
Localities around Gisborne South
Gisborne	Gisborne	Riddells Creek
Bullengarook	Gisborne South	Sunbury
Wombat State Forest	Toolern Vale	Sunbury

Gisborne South is a locality in the southern part of the Macedon Ranges, a 40-minute drive from Melbourne, Australia. Known for its vineyards, olive groves and thriving equestrian and alpaca industries, Gisborne South is the closest to Melbourne's CBD of the Macedon Ranges' townships.

Gisborne South consists entirely of large scenic acreages due to its location just outside Melbourne's Green Wedge – a designation for non-urban areas of metropolitan Melbourne that lie outside the Urban Growth Boundary. As such, it does not have its own central commercial area. Residents travel to the nearby town of Gisborne to access services and amenities.

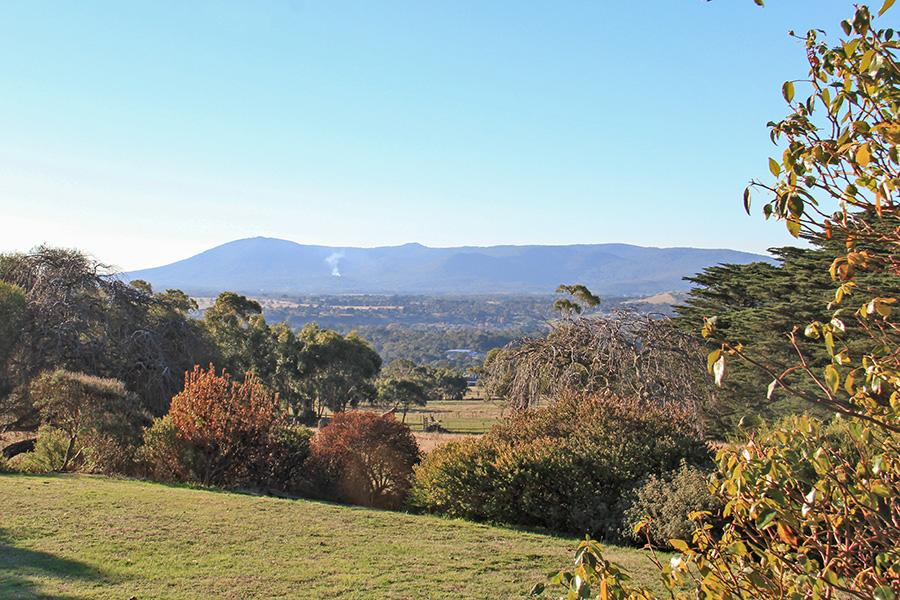
Mount Gisborne Road

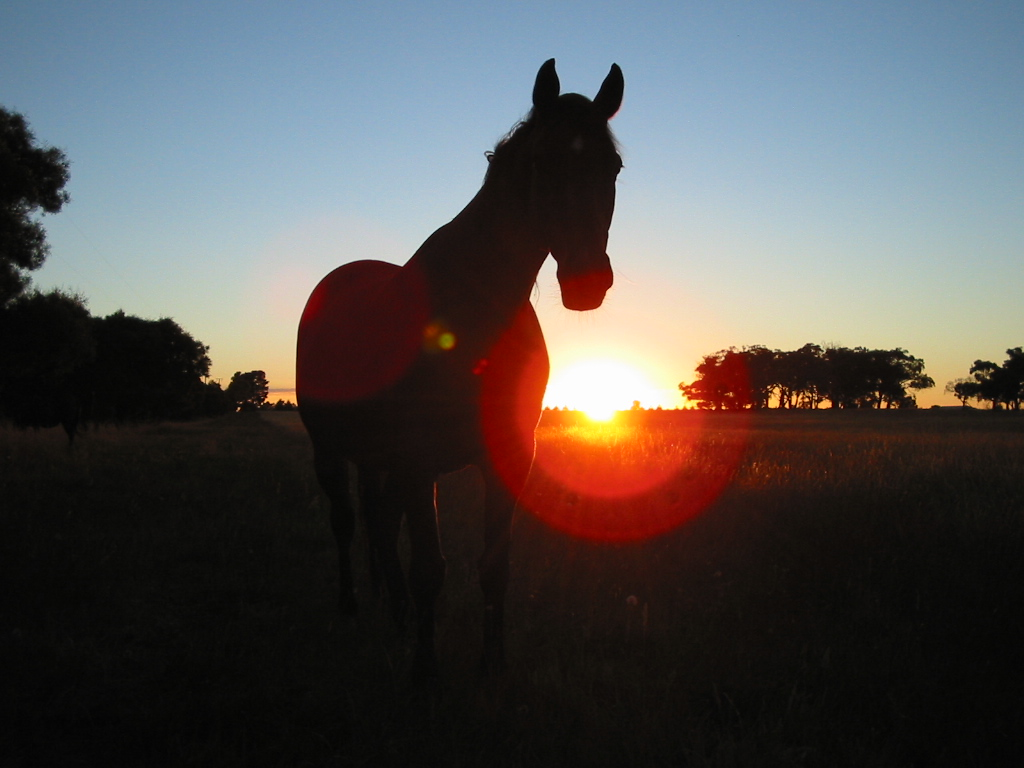
A horse in Gisborne South

== Today ==
Gisborne South has become a popular tree change destination for Melbourne residents seeking large country blocks on which to escape the urban sprawl, establish hobby farms or keep horses while being within easy commuting distance to Melbourne.
