= Shire of Ballan =

Coordinates: 37°36′S 144°15′E

- Local government area
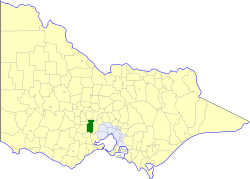
- Location in Victoria

- The Shire of Ballan as at its dissolution in 1994
- Country: Australia
- State: Victoria
- Region: Grampians
- Established: 1862
- Council seat: Ballan

Area
  - Total: 919.45 km^{2} (355.00 sq mi)

Population
  - Total: 4,900 (1992)
  - Density: 5.33/km^{2} (13.80/sq mi)
- County: Bourke, Grant, Talbot
LGAs around Shire of Ballan
Bungaree	Daylesford and Glenlyon	Kyneton
Buninyong	Shire of Ballan	Bacchus Marsh
Buninyong	Bannockburn	Corio

The Shire of Ballan was a local government area about 75 kilometres (47 mi) west of Melbourne, the state capital of Victoria, Australia. The shire covered an area of 919.45 square kilometres (355.0 sq mi), and existed from 1862 until 1994.

== History ==
Ballan was first incorporated as a road district on 14 October 1862, and became a shire on 2 November 1864. On 9 October 1921, parts of the shire were annexed to the Shire of Kyneton.

On 15 December 1994, the Shire of Ballan was abolished, and along with the Shire of Bacchus Marsh, was merged into the Shire of Moorabool, which was created earlier in May 1994 after the merger of the Shire of Bungaree and parts of the Shire of Buninyong.

== Wards ==
The Shire of Ballan was divided into four ridings, each of which elected three councillors:

- East Riding
- Central Riding
- West Riding
- South Riding

== Towns and localities ==
- Ballan*
- Blackwood
- Blakeville
- Bunding
- Fiskville
- Gordon
- Greendale
- Ingliston
- Morrisons
- Mount Egerton
- Mount Wallace

* Council seat.

== Population ==
Year	Population
1954	2,752
1958	2,830*
1961	2,440
1966	2,349
1971	2,163
1976	2,206
1981	2,624
1986	3,338
1991	4,654

* Estimate in 1958 Victorian Year Book.
