= Macedon, Victoria =

Macedon
- Town
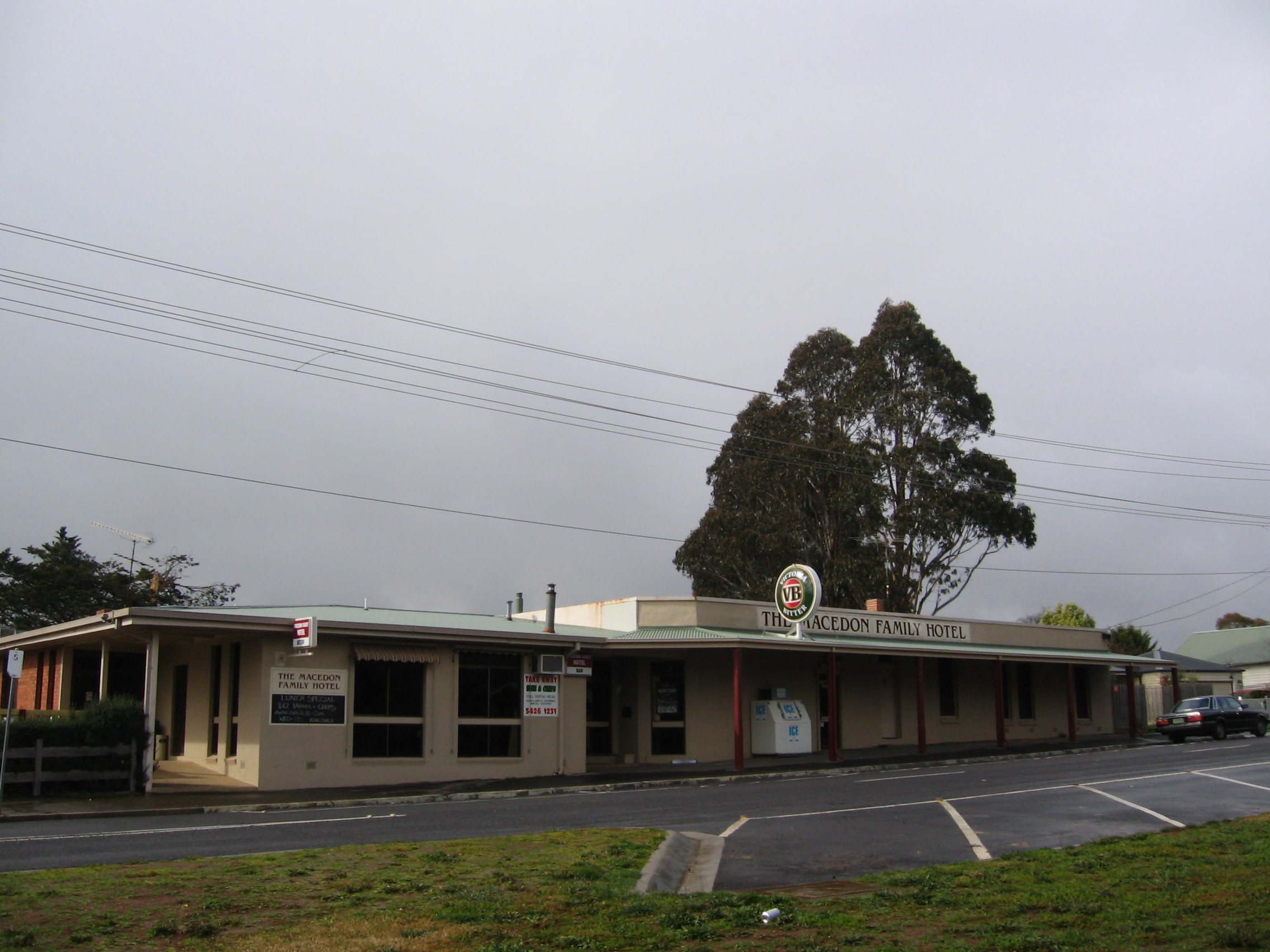
- The Macedon Family Hotel, circa 2009

- Interactive map of Macedon
- Coordinates: 37°25′S 144°34′E
- Country: Australia
- State: Victoria
- LGA: Shire of Macedon Ranges
- Location: 62 km (39 mi) NW of Melbourne; 91 km (57 mi) SE of Bendigo

Government
  - State electorate: Macedon
  - Federal division: McEwen

Area
  - Total: 39.4 km^{2} (15.2 sq mi)
- Elevation: 505 m (1,657 ft)

Population
  - Total: 2,073 (2021 census)
  - Density: 52.61/km^{2} (136.27/sq mi)
- Time zone: UTC+10 (AEST)
  - Summer (DST): UTC+11 (AEDT)
- Postcode: 3440
- Mean max temp: 15.3 °C (59.5 °F)
- Mean min temp: 7.1 °C (44.8 °F)
- Annual rainfall: 843.9 mm (33.22 in)
Localities around Macedon
Woodend	Woodend	Mount Macedon
Lerderderg State Park	Macedon	Mount Macedon
Bullengarook	Bullengarook	Gisborne

Macedon (/ˈmæsədən/ MASS-ə-dən) is a town at the foot of Mount Macedon in the Macedon Ranges, between Melbourne and Bendigo in central Victoria. It is administered by the Shire of Macedon Ranges. Macedon recorded a population of 2,073 at the 2021 census, while its urban population was 2,926, up from 2,808 at the 2016 census. The combined population of Macedon and the nearby larger town of Gisborne was 21,071 at June 2016.

== Etymology ==
Macedon's name derives from the Ancient Kingdom of Macedon. The toponym Macedon is derived itself from the ancient Greek adjective μακεδνός (makednós), meaning "tall", possibly descriptive of the inhabitants of Macedon. It has the same root as the adjective μακρός (makros), meaning "long" or "tall" in Ancient Greek. The name is originally believed to have meant either "highlanders", "the tall ones", or "high grown men".

== History ==
The original inhabitants of Macedon are the Kulin nation - specifically, the Wurundjeri, Dja Dja Wurrrung and Taungurung people, who have lived there continually for at least 26,000 years. Their communities are still active today.

Europeans arrived in 1837, and early interactions between Kulin Aboriginal people and European settlers were strained, with reports of thefts of stock; however there were no massacres of Aboriginal people reported in the district in the authoritative study.

In the 1850s, gold was discovered in the Victorian Goldfields. Middle Gully, as Macedon was called back then, became a hub of activity and provided inns, beer houses, coffee tents, blacksmiths’ forges and stores for the crowds of gold miners.

The gold rush of the 1850s-1870s ensured that the area continued to flourish, and the construction of the railway between Melbourne and Bendigo from 1858 to 1862 brought many new residents to the region.

The town was affected by the land boom of the late 1880s, with investors being brought up by specially arranged trains. At the peak, property prices increased by up to 3 or 4 times in a short time.

By 1893, the settlement had taken on the name Macedon and was growing through a co-operative association model with shared labour clearing land and building dwellings and fencing. Local industry sprung up, including a butter factory, said by a Melbourne newspaper at the time as "situated about one mile from the station, on the road to the mount. The building is in brick, 25 x 46ft. The separator is 100gal. capacity, and can revolve 7,000 times per minute. It contains all the latest improvements in butter-making machinery. The whole plant is worked by a six-horse water-wheel, supplied by pipes from a private reservoir."

Throughout the late 19th and early 20th century, Melbourne's wealthy social elite began to settle the area in earnest due to large blocks of land on the south side of Mount Macedon being released to them by the government.

In 1903 the Australian handbook described Macedon as "a post, money-order, savings bank and telegraph town. It is situated on the Melbourne and Echuca railway, 43¼ rail miles NNW of the former. There are three hotels, Moody's Family, Victorian Alps and State Nursery Hotel, two general stores, a State school (No. 1,660), Anglican, Wesleyan and Roman Catholic churches, Jubilee hall, library and a State nursery in the neighbourhood, also several eucalyptus oil works."

=== State Nursery Hotel ===
The former State Nursery Hotel was built in 1859 by James Nicholls and Eliza Weedon. It was originally called the Bricklayers Arms as it had been constructed of bricks from the publican's nearby Nicholls Brickworks. It was given the name State Nursery Hotel in 1881. The hotel became a private dwelling in 1926 and has survived to the present.

=== Victorian Alps Hotel ===
The Victorian Alps Hotel was built in 1874 for William Salter Cook. It was located on the corner of Victoria Street and Margaret Street. In 1915 the hotel licence was cancelled and it became a private home until it was destroyed in the 1983 Ash Wednesday fires. A write-up in the Gisbourne Gazette of a game played by the Macedon Cats against the nearby Gisborne team in 1892 mentions a visit by both teams to the Victorian Alps Hotel after the game.

=== Macedon Railway Hotel ===
The Macedon Railway Hotel was built in 1870. In 1885 the hotel was renamed the Macedon Family Hotel. During the Ash Wednesday bushfires in 1983, a large number of locals & pets successfully sheltered in the hotel throughout the firestorm, with a report from 1984 describing "some men bravely hosed the outside of the hotel, while others, even previous fighters, refused to take their turns because of fear".

=== 1918 Avenue of Honour ===
The village of Macedon is home to a State significant heritage listed war memorial Avenue of Honour, an extensive planting of 154 oak trees on both sides of the avenue for approximately one kilometre in length between the cemetery at Bent Street and Mt Macedon Road. The trees, comprising Pin Oaks, English oaks, Algerian oaks and oak hybrids were planted by members of the local community working each Saturday for three months in 1918, with each tree planted representing the life of an enlisted soldier from the local area.

The opening ceremony for the Avenue was held on 10 August 1918 with "the State Premier (Mr. Lawson) and the Federal and State members for the district are expected to be present, and a strong band is to be in attendance". The Premier said that this Avenue "would serve to remind the future generations of their obligations to the men, and women too, who were now doing so much for mankind, and, furthermore, would stand as an example of great public service" and that the community "will regard it as a sacred duty to look after this avenue, care for the trees, and remember the grand purpose underlying the whole movement".

The autumn colours of the Avenue of Honour attract a large influx of visitors annually, prompting the local council to introduce temporary traffic and parking restrictions in recent years.

=== 1983 Ash Wednesday Bushfires ===
Macedon was one of the towns extensively damaged by the Ash Wednesday bushfires on 16 February 1983, with 2 deaths in the town and 64 houses destroyed.

Most of the shops, the Catholic Church (circa 1891) and Anglican church (circa 1931) were burnt, along with the Jubilee hall, the fire station, the school and the Water Board's office. At least 160 residents survived by sheltering overnight in the Macedon Family Club Hotel, which had been saved by Macedon brigade. Witnesses reported that during the ordeal the hotel's windows were "red-hot" and "sparks continuously sprayed the room each time the door was opened".

The Victorian newspaper The Age reported the next day that "A fire officer came out of Macedon at 3am and said: 'I saw one house and one pub standing.'"

Australian Defence Force members were deployed to assist the town in the aftermath, such as disposing of dead livestock, after the Victorian Minister for Police and Emergency Services requested help from the Federal Government.

A public park near the centre of Macedon, located across the road from Macedon's railway station, now serves as a memorial to the losses of Ash Wednesday.

=== Today ===
In recent years, Macedon's popularity has increased: proximity to Melbourne, boutique bed and breakfast accommodation, food and wine industries and arts scene have made the region highly sought after, drawing tourists and new residents, making the local population growth rate among the fastest in regional Victoria.

Locals, worried about the environmental and cultural impacts of this growing popularity, successfully campaigned for new planning controls to protect the character of the region.

A number of media reports have made reference to the influx of young professionals, artists and 'hipsters' to the region, drawn by the region's natural environment, proximity to the city and access to city-style cafes and restaurants.

== Attractions ==
=== Vineyards ===
There are several commercial vineyards open to the public in the area immediately surrounding Macedon, including North Wine and Mount Macedon Winery, which at one time was owned by entertainer Olivia Newton-John.

=== Private Zoo ===
Wild Action Zoo, a licensed private zoological facility on 11 acres of land is located in Macedon and provides education about animals via prearranged visits or via a mobile zoo around the State of Victoria. The zoo's owner, Chris Humfrey starred in a TV series "Chris Humfrey's Animal Instinct" which ran on the Australian version of Animal Planet, a Pay-TV channel.

== Economy ==
The initial economy of the town was based on timber and servicing the gold rush further inland from Melbourne.

Later a number of eucalyptus distilleries opened up in the town due to a considerable demand for eucalyptus for medicinal purposes. The first was opened in 1894 which was "a eucalyptus oil distillery, which is to be erected in Mrs Pinchoffs paddock by Mr Moody, of the Macedon Hotel". The "Wombat Brand" eucalyptus oil was manufactured at the Macedon Eucalyptus Oil Distillery in the late 1800s.

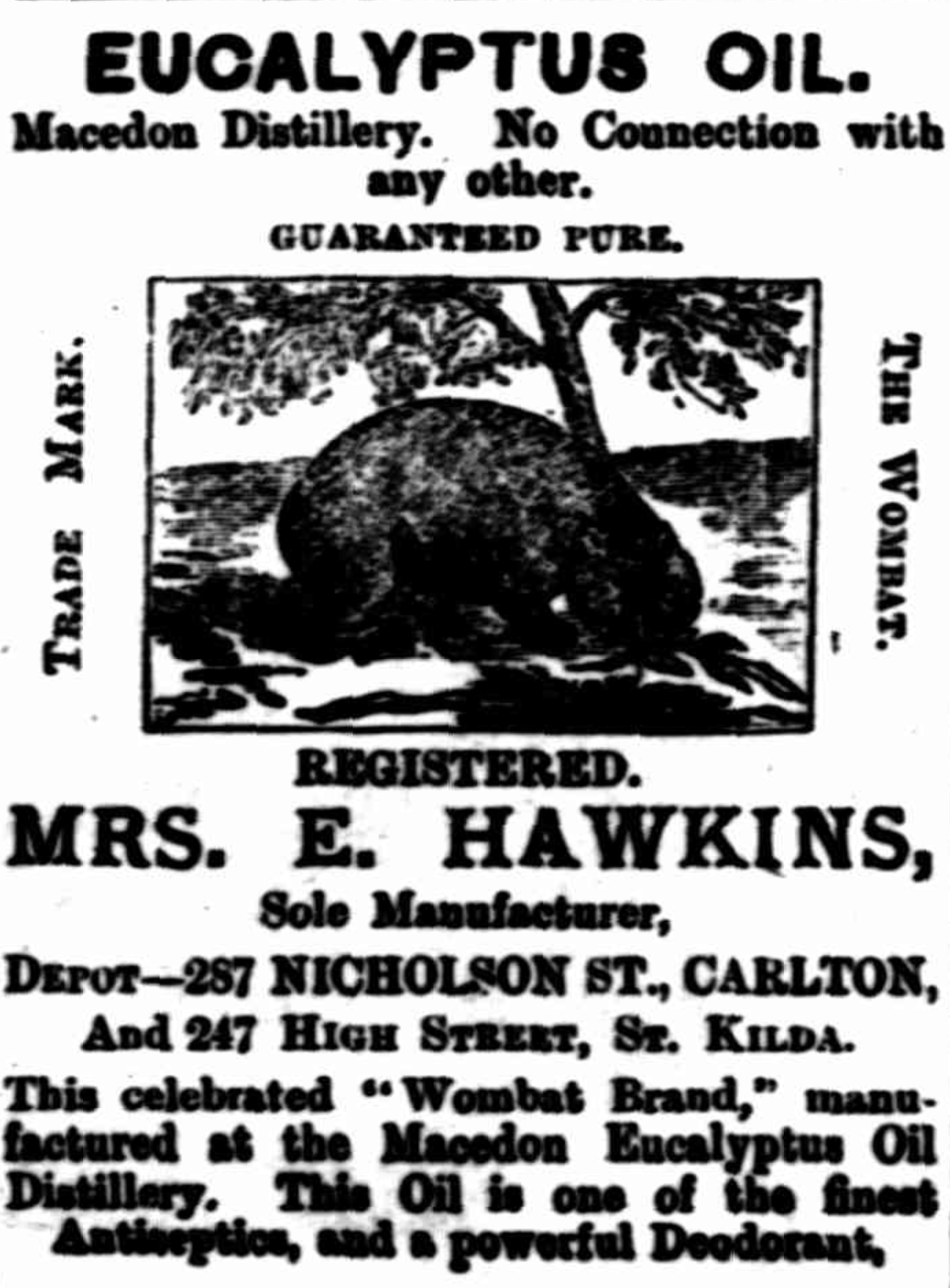
Advertisement in Mercury and Weekly Courier May 1897 for Macedon Distillery The Wombat Trade Mark Eucalyptus Oil

As of the 2016 census, the main industries employing people in the Macedon area is Education & Training (13.1%), Healthcare and Social Assistance (10.5%), Construction (10%), Professional, Scientific and Technical Services (9.4%), Public Administration and Safety (7.3%), Retail (6.4%) and Manufacturing (6%).

== Transport ==
The railway line from Melbourne was constructed in 1861, one year after the township was surveyed, near a once-permanent creek. The township was first named Middle Gully, however within a few years of the opening of the railway, Middle Gully's name was changed to Macedon. The railway line's route includes heritage listed Middle Gully rail bridge, completed in 1862 just to the west of Macedon which is an example of one of the earliest metal plate girder road bridges in Victoria.

The railway at Macedon later transported horticultural produce & timber to Melbourne and was the stopping-off point for visitors to resort facilities on Mount Macedon.

Macedon railway station is located on the V/Line Bendigo line.

In 1970 the Tullamarine Freeway was opened, putting Macedon within easier commuting distance of outer metropolitan Melbourne.

== Education ==
=== Primary ===
Macedon Primary School is a State public school that was established in 1869. The school maintains a current enrolment of 242 students as at 2019.

=== Secondary ===
==== Macedon Grammar School ====
Macedon Grammar was a secondary school that operated from 1979 to 2014. In November 2014, Macedon Grammar school went into administration and the Victorian government announced in December 2014 that the school would close.

==== Alice Miller School ====
After Macedon Grammar school was closed in 2014 the site was purchased the following year by children's author John Mardsen who opened the Alice Miller School, a secondary school for 200 pupils focused on the arts. It is based on the same principles as his Candlebark School (opened 2006) in the Macedon Ranges. The school campus occupies a site of 80 acres of primarily bushland. Facilities include 15 classrooms, science laboratories, gymnasium, 10 metre indoor heated pool, tennis and basketball courts and a five-hole golf course.

== Sport ==
Macedon is home to the Macedon Football & Netball Club, known as the Macedon Cats. The club was founded in 1887.

== Environment ==
The local bushland surrounding was Macedon was harvested extensively for timber since 1850s.

=== Macedon State Nursery ===
However the timber industry had so denuded the entire surrounding mountain range, that in 1872, the State Government established the 100 acre Macedon State Nursery, to encourage the replanting of the mountain and to supply seedlings to all parts of Victoria, which it did at no cost to public institutions such as schools, benevolent institutions, hospitals and reserves. By 1888, annual production was around 200,000 seedlings with a projected annual output by 1890 of 700,000-1 million plants.

Newspaper articles from the late 19th and early 20th century describe the wide variety of plants that flourished at the State Nursery in spite of its poor topsoil and craggy terrain. One description of a visit to the nursery by the Minister of Mines and Forests in 1909 was of "many fine specimens of Oregon, American spruce, Californian redwood, yellow pine, and Himalayan cedar". Cool-climate trees like cypress, larch, cedar and pine thrived at the high altitude; deciduous species of oak, ash and birch grew well, as did native eucalypts and casuarinas.

The majority of the trees that were propagated at the nursery were of European and English varieties with which the landowners were familiar, hence the unique character of many of the early avenues in nearby towns such as Gisborne and in the grand gardens of Mount Macedon. Trials of the cultivation of other crops such as tea and tobacco were undertaken, with little success.

This nursery also provided training & employment for many of the former timber industry workers and to boys and young men through the Boy's Farm School that operated at the government nursery from around 1882 to 1885.

Perhaps as a consequence of its success, Macedon Nursery periodically received complaints of unfair competition from the nursery industry until it was closed by the Government in 1995.

=== Timber Plantations ===
There are a number of established commercial timber plantations around Macedon in the Black Forest. The plantations were established by the State Government in 1880 and were privatised through the sale of the Victorian Plantations Corporation in 1998 to Hancock Timber Resource Group for $550 million to form Hancock Victorian Plantations (HVP).

The Macedon Black Forest plantations are now owned and operated by a private company HVP Plantations.

== Climate ==
Climate data for Macedon Forestry
Month	Jan	Feb	Mar	Apr	May	Jun	Jul	Aug	Sep	Oct	Nov	Dec	Year
Record high °C (°F)	39.4 (102.9)	38.2 (100.8)	36.1 (97.0)	29.1 (84.4)	23.9 (75.0)	16.9 (62.4)	18.3 (64.9)	22.5 (72.5)	25.0 (77.0)	30.6 (87.1)	37.0 (98.6)	37.2 (99.0)	39.4 (102.9)
Mean daily maximum °C (°F)	23.0 (73.4)	23.2 (73.8)	20.0 (68.0)	15.4 (59.7)	11.4 (52.5)	8.6 (47.5)	7.8 (46.0)	9.4 (48.9)	12.1 (53.8)	15.8 (60.4)	18.9 (66.0)	21.7 (71.1)	15.6 (60.1)
Daily mean °C (°F)	17.1 (62.8)	17.5 (63.5)	15.0 (59.0)	11.4 (52.5)	8.4 (47.1)	6.0 (42.8)	5.1 (41.2)	6.2 (43.2)	8.2 (46.8)	11.1 (52.0)	13.5 (56.3)	15.7 (60.3)	11.3 (52.3)
Mean daily minimum °C (°F)	11.2 (52.2)	11.8 (53.2)	10.0 (50.0)	7.5 (45.5)	5.5 (41.9)	3.5 (38.3)	2.5 (36.5)	3.1 (37.6)	4.4 (39.9)	6.4 (43.5)	8.1 (46.6)	9.8 (49.6)	7.0 (44.6)
Record low °C (°F)	0.0 (32.0)	2.2 (36.0)	0.5 (32.9)	−2.0 (28.4)	−2.8 (27.0)	−6.0 (21.2)	−6.0 (21.2)	−4.2 (24.4)	−5.9 (21.4)	−2.5 (27.5)	−3.0 (26.6)	−1.0 (30.2)	−6.0 (21.2)
Average precipitation mm (inches)	47.8 (1.88)	50.9 (2.00)	53.1 (2.09)	63.1 (2.48)	74.7 (2.94)	84.2 (3.31)	83.8 (3.30)	86.8 (3.42)	86.5 (3.41)	81.3 (3.20)	67.6 (2.66)	57.5 (2.26)	854.2 (33.63)
Average rainy days	7.4	7.0	8.8	10.3	13.7	15.1	16.4	16.1	14.4	13.3	10.4	9.2	142.1
Average afternoon relative humidity (%)	51	49	51	60	73	80	76	72	70	62	57	55	63

== Film and television industry ==
Macedon is often known as the town from "Picnic at Hanging Rock", the 1975 mystery movie based on the novel of the same name.

Parts of the 2009 Nicolas Cage film "Knowing" was shot around Macedon, most notably the local petrol station which was renovated to appear more like an American gas station. Most of the film was also shot nearby in Mount Macedon.

The television series 'Chris Humfrey's Wild Life' was filmed in Macedon. The series aired in March 2011 on the Australian Broadcasting Corporation.

The 2018 remake of Picnic at Hanging Rock was filmed in the region, and the award-winning score was composed in the region by local producer Jan Skubiszewski.

The Macedon Reservoir was used as the location for the trailer park in the opening sequences of the Liam Neeson film Blacklight in 2020. Filming was undertaken with access to the area controlled as part of local COVID-19 restrictions.
