= Gisborne, Victoria =

Gisborne
- Town
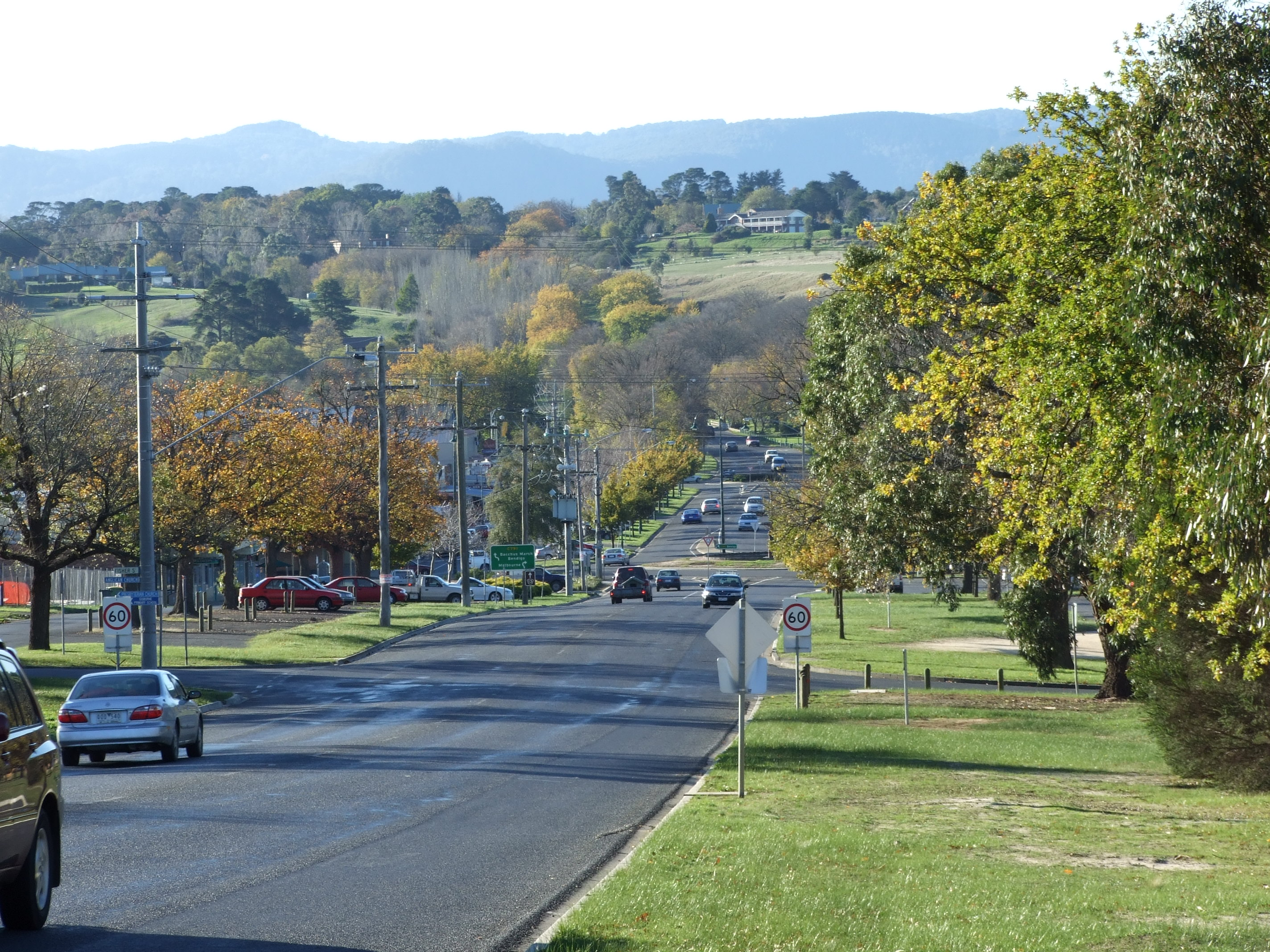
- View down the main street from the south

- Interactive map of Gisborne
- Coordinates: 37°29′24″S 144°35′20″E
- Country: Australia
- State: Victoria
- LGA: Shire of Macedon Ranges
- Location: 54 km (34 mi) NW of Melbourne; 16 km (9.9 mi) NW of Sunbury; 86 km (53 mi) SE of Bendigo; 81 km (50 mi) E of Ballarat
- Established: 1851

Government
  - State electorate: Macedon
  - Federal division: McEwen

Area
  - Total: 211 km^{2} (81 sq mi)
- Elevation: 443 m (1,453 ft)

Population
  - Total: 14,432 (2021)
  - Density: 68.40/km^{2} (177.2/sq mi)
- Postcode: 3437
Localities around Gisborne
Macedon	New Gisborne	Riddells Creek
Bullengarook	Gisborne	Sunbury
Bullengarook	Toolern Vale	Gisborne South

Gisborne (/ˈɡɪzbərn/) is a town in the Macedon Ranges, located about 54 kilometres (34 mi) north-west of Melbourne, Victoria, Australia. It is the largest town in the Macedon Ranges Shire, with a population of 14,432 as of June 2021 in the Gisborne district region.

Gisborne is known for its country homesteads, tree-lined streets, restaurants and cafes. The town has become a popular 'tree change' destination for Melbourne residents seeking large leafy blocks and a quiet lifestyle within easy commuting distance from the city. As such, the town has grown substantially over the past 5–10 years, with an increase of almost 2,600 residents since 2011, although planning controls have been implemented to protect the character and "outstanding natural beauty" of the region.

== History ==
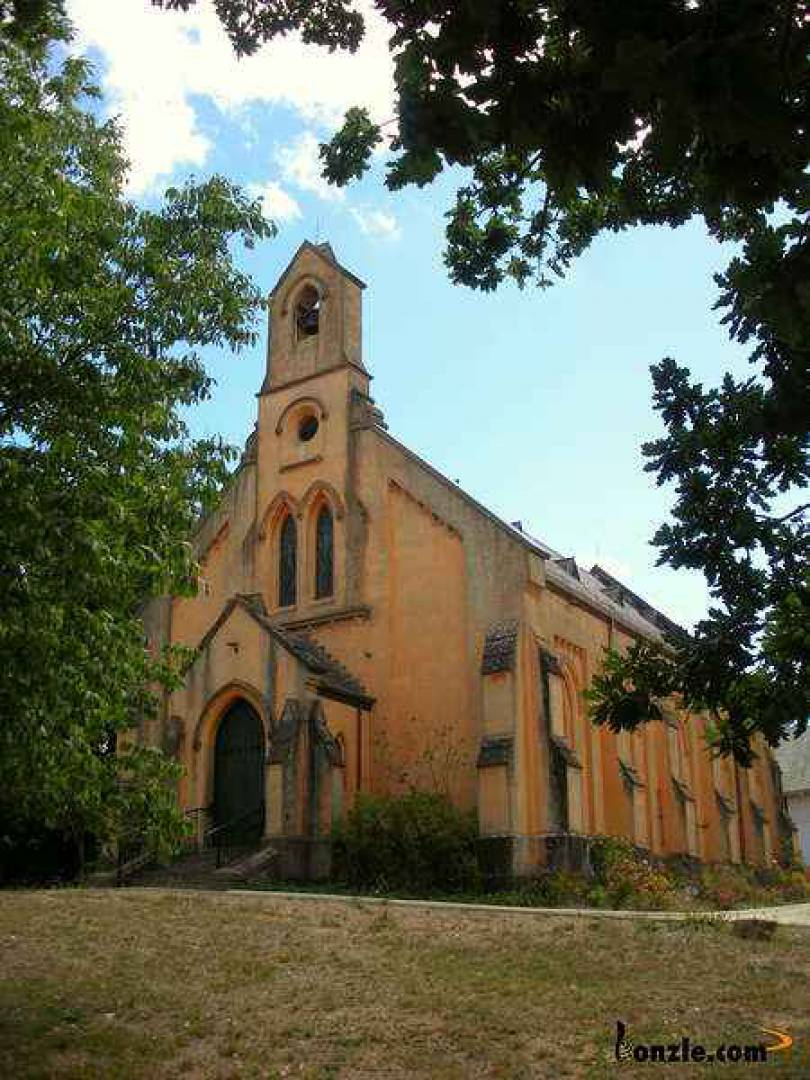
Gisborne Presbyterian Church

The Gisborne town site was first settled on 24 March 1837 by George Hamilton. The area further south of Gisborne had been settled earlier by John Aitken, who squatted on the land, having shipped his merino sheep from Tasmania.

In 1840, Henry Fyshe Gisborne, Commissioner of Crown Lands for the Port Phillip District, set up an outpost for his Border Police troopers to assist colonialists with the suppression of Aboriginal resistance.

A hotel named the Bush Inn was built near the barracks in the same year. Gisborne Post Office opened on 22 March 1850, and the Bush Inn was renamed the Gisborne Hotel ten days later, in honour of Henry Fyshe Gisborne.

In 1858 Edward Cherry established Cherry & Sons, a company who made timber butter churns. This was one of the oldest industries in country Victoria and at its height it exported butter churns to many countries in Africa and Asia. The company later diversified into other products such as post hole diggers and equipment for government schools. Its factory was destroyed by a fire in 1912 but was rebuilt and the company survived into the 1970s.

== Today ==
Gisborne is the largest township in the Macedon Ranges and the closest to Melbourne's city centre, which can be accessed easily via a 45-minute drive along the Calder Freeway or a 50-minute train ride on the Bendigo Line. The population in June 2018 was 13,963 having grown on average 2.93% year-on-year for the five years preceding 2018.

The town centre has many cafes and wine bars, as well a theatre, restaurants and galleries, monthly farmers' market, an organic butcher and four supermarkets. Gisborne has a full-time police station in conjunction with the CFA station, State Emergency Service and medical-ambulance facilities.

Sporting facilities cater for Australian rules football, cricket, soccer, tennis, netball, basketball, gymnastics, and lawn bowls, as well as a heated indoor pool. The popular golf course is located within the township and regularly features as one of the top 100 public access courses in Australia. The Gisborne Soccer Club president is ex-Socceroo and Melbourne Victory captain Carl Valeri.

A number of media reports have made reference to the influx of young professionals, artists and 'hipsters' to the region, drawn by the region's natural beauty, proximity to Melbourne and access to city-style cafes and restaurants. The large numbers of new residents is making the local population growth rate among the fastest in regional Victoria. Locals, worried about the environmental and cultural impacts of this growing popularity, successfully campaigned for new planning controls to protect the character of the region.

== Population ==
In the 2016 census, Gisborne had a population count of 9,822 people. At the time, 82.1% of the town's residents were born in Australia, with the most common foreign countries of birth being England (4.0%) and New Zealand (1.3%). The most common responses for religion were "No Religion" (35.3%), Catholic (28.3%) and Anglican (13.0%).

== Geography and climate ==
Climate data for Gisborne (Rosslynne Reservoir) (2008–); 451m AMSL; 37.48° S, 144.57° E
Month	Jan	Feb	Mar	Apr	May	Jun	Jul	Aug	Sep	Oct	Nov	Dec	Year
Average precipitation mm (inches)	59.5 (2.34)	48.1 (1.89)	59.3 (2.33)	79.0 (3.11)	66.0 (2.60)	71.0 (2.80)	63.5 (2.50)	71.0 (2.80)	63.5 (2.50)	71.0 (2.80)	80.4 (3.17)	57.2 (2.25)	748.3 (29.46)
Source: Monthly rainfall: Gisborne (Rosslynne Reservoir)

== Public transport ==
The town's railway station is on the Bendigo Line, serviced by V/Line. Trains take 20 minutes between Gisborne and Sunbury, where customers can connect directly to Metro services; otherwise, V/Line can take customers directly into Melbourne's CBD, terminating at Southern Cross Station. When the railway line was being built, it was too difficult to get the trains down into Gisborne's township due to terrain, so instead the Gisborne railway station was built just outside the township, forming the new suburb of New Gisborne.

The town has its own dedicated bus service operated by Gisborne Transit which runs looped shuttle services around the township, as well as on-demand pick-up and drop-off services connecting townsfolk to the railway station, as part of PTV.

== Media ==
The town receives all of Melbourne's metropolitan digital television channels, including Channel 31. The town also receives television from Mount Alexander but signals from Melbourne are much stronger. The town is largely serviced by major publication newspapers such as The Age, but Gisborne also receives free weekly regional news from the Midland Express, as well as a monthly Gisborne-dedicated publication, the GREAT Gisborne Gazette.

Gisborne features as a backdrop for several films and television series, including Nightmares & Dreamscapes: From the Stories of Stephen King. In 2022, Gisborne South was chosen as the filming location for the reality television series The Block.

== Education ==
The town has three public and two Catholic primary schools, as well as one public secondary school, Gisborne Secondary College. The Gisborne Montessori School and Candlebark (alternative school) provide additional options.

== Sister cities ==
- Gisborne, New Zealand

== Image gallery ==
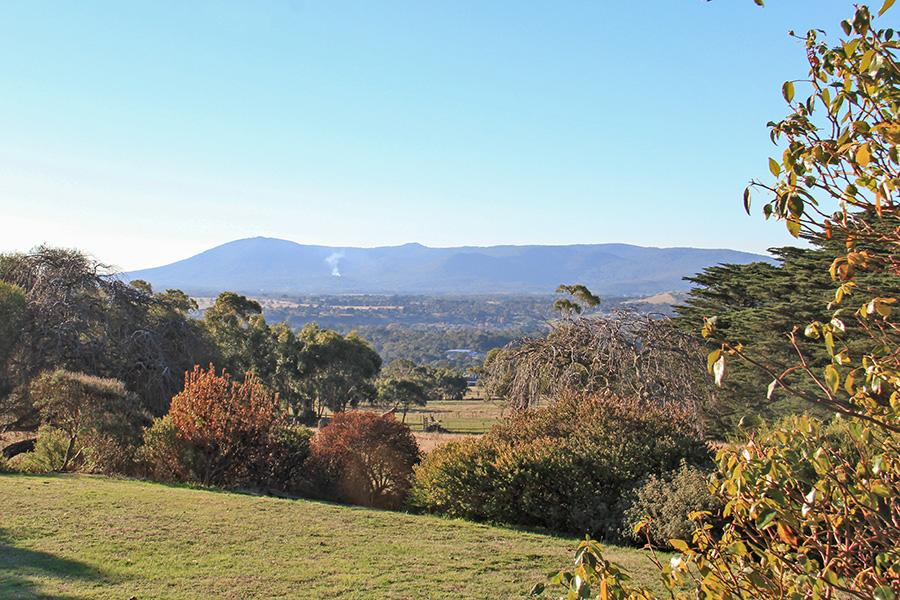
View from Mount Gisborne Road in Gisborne South

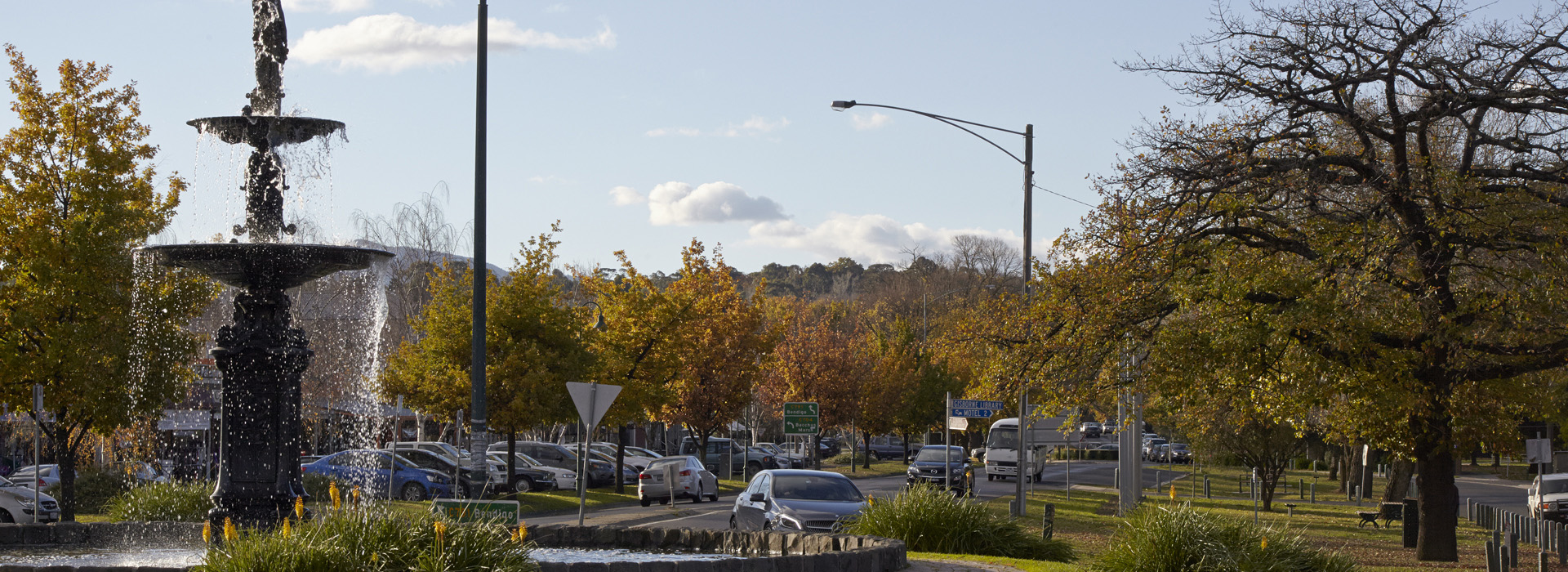
Gisborne Fountain - Hamilton St and Aitken St Gisborne

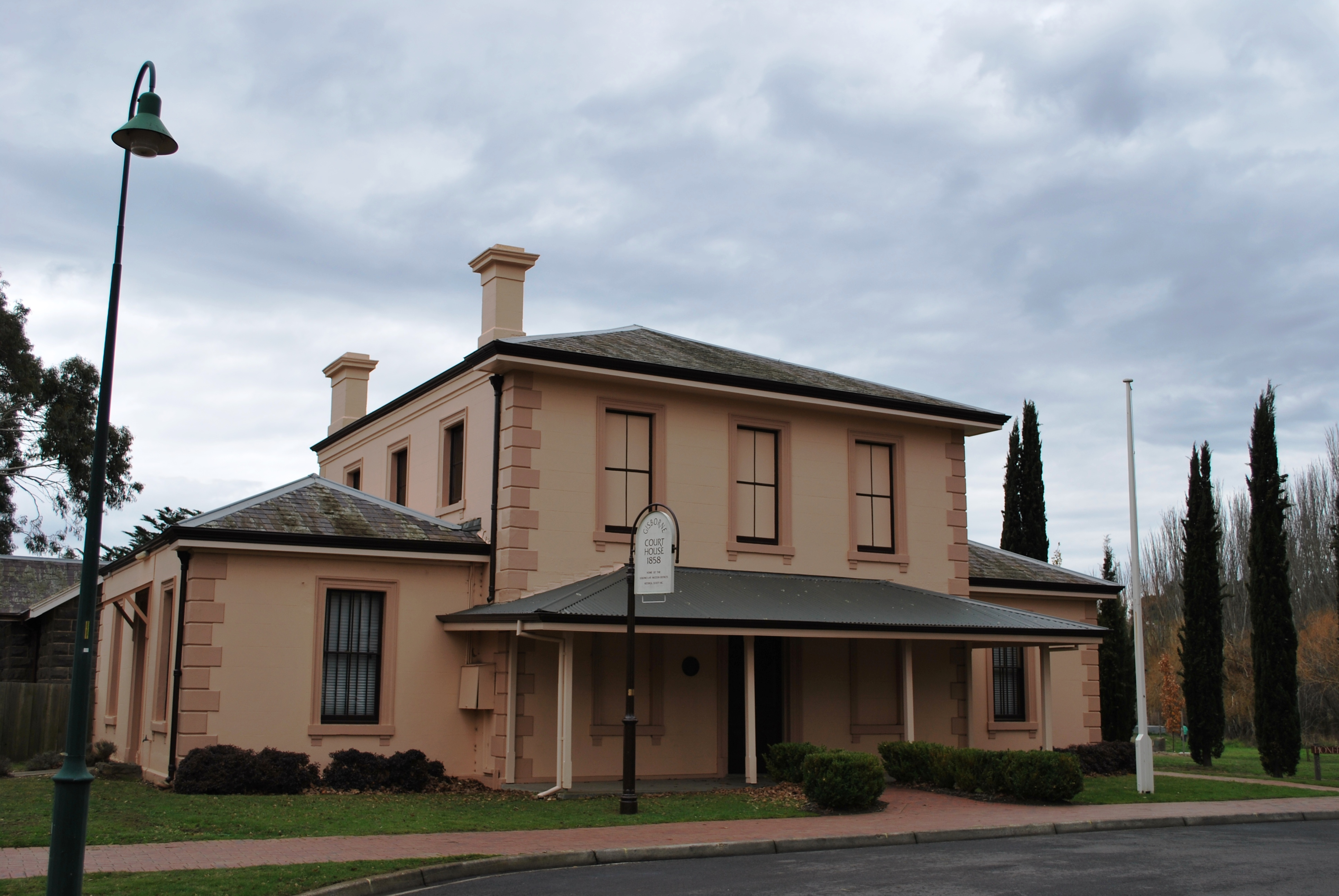
Gisborne Court House

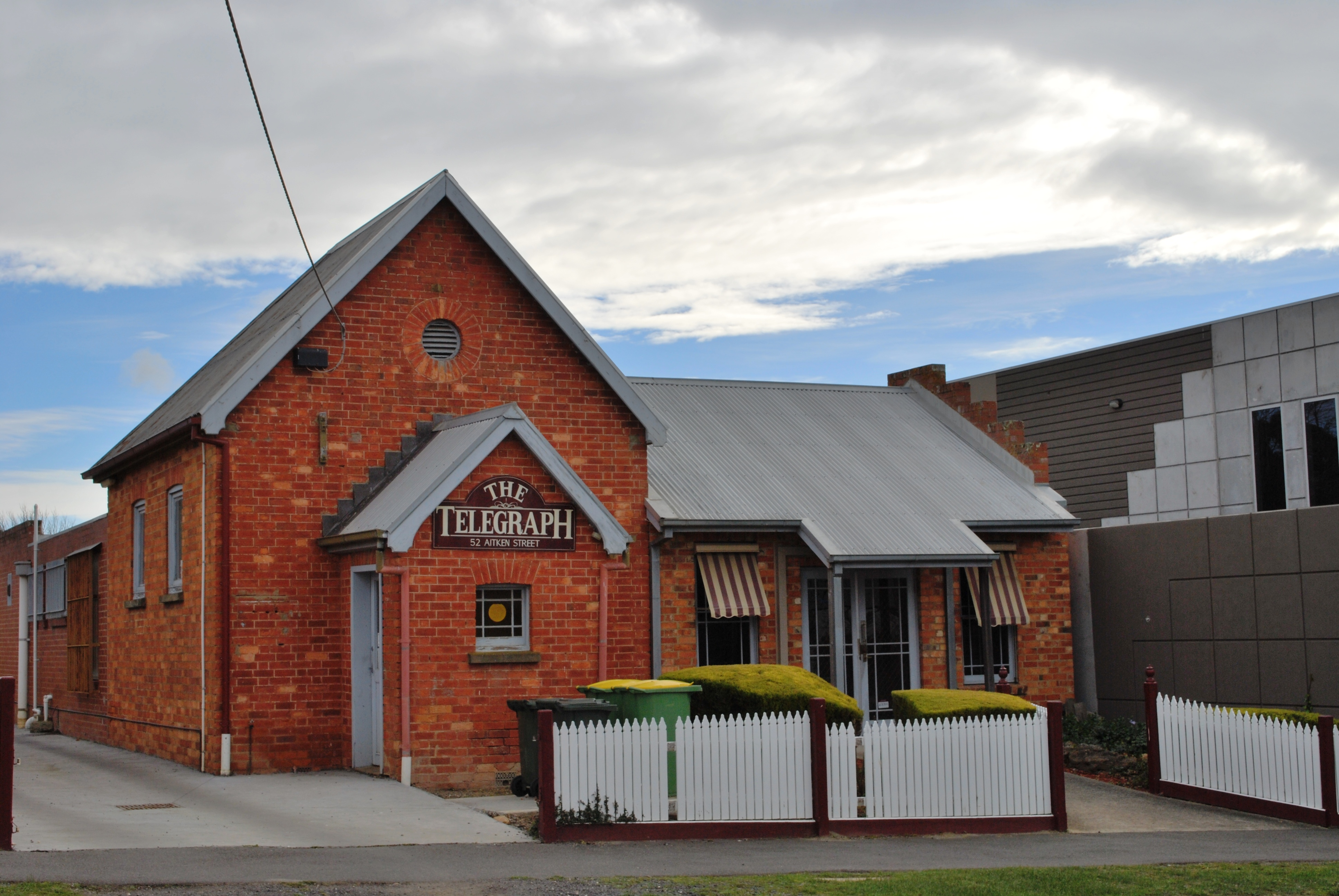
Gisborne Telegraph Office

== See also ==
- Gisborne railway station, Victoria
- New Gisborne
- Sunbury, Victoria
- Gisborne South
- Gisborne Secondary College
- Bullengarook
