= Shire of Gisborne =

Coordinates: 37°29′S 144°35′E

Shire of Gisborne Victoria
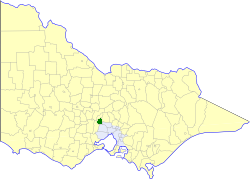
- Location in Victoria
- The Shire of Gisborne as at its dissolution in 1995
- Population: 10,330 (1992)
  - Density: 37.275/km^{2} (96.54/sq mi)
- Established: 1860
- Area: 277.13 km^{2} (107.0 sq mi)
- Council seat: Gisborne
- Region: North Central Victoria
- County: Bourke
LGAs around Shire of Gisborne:
| Newham and Woodend | Newham and Woodend | Romsey |
| Bacchus Marsh | Shire of Gisborne | Romsey |
| Bacchus Marsh | Melton | Bulla |

The Shire of Gisborne was a local government area northwest of Melbourne until its abolition in 1995, when the Shire of Macedon Ranges was created from the merging of the Shires of Gisborne, Newham and Woodend, Romsey, and parts of the Shire of Kyneton.

== History ==
Gisborne was first incorporated as a road district on 9 November 1860, and became a shire on 24 February 1871.

On 19 January 1995, the Shire of Gisborne was abolished, and along with the Shires of Newham and Woodend and Romsey, and parts of the Shire of Kyneton, was merged into the newly created Shire of Macedon Ranges.

== Wards ==
The Shire of Gisborne was divided into three ridings on 30 August 1961, each of which elected three councillors:

- Gisborne Riding
- Bullengarook Riding
- Macedon Riding

== Population ==
| Year | Population |
|---|---|
| 1954 | 2,122 |
| 1958 | 2,230* |
| 1961 | 2,159 |
| 1966 | 2,319 |
| 1971 | 2,917 |
| 1976 | 4,911 |
| 1981 | 7,074 |
| 1986 | 8,474 |
| 1991 | 9,765 |

* Estimate in the 1958 Victorian Year Book.
