= Bullengarook =

- Town
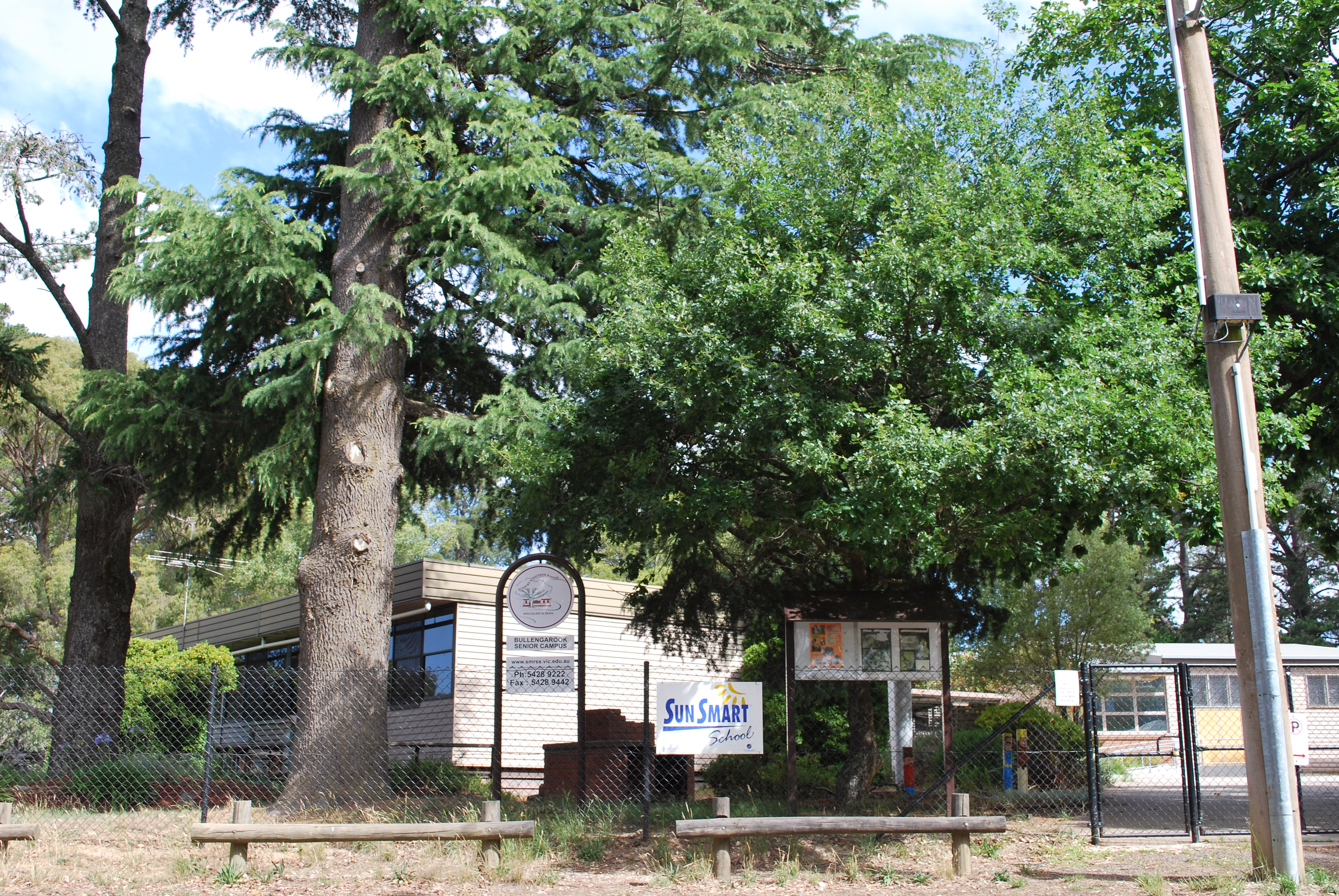
- Former Primary school

- Coordinates: 37°31′S 144°29′E
- Country: Australia
- State: Victoria
- LGA: Shire of Macedon Ranges
- Location: 68.2 km (42.4 mi) NW of Melbourne; 14 km (8.7 mi) W of Gisborne; 19 km (12 mi) N of Bacchus Marsh; 22 km (14 mi) S of Woodend

Government
  - State electorate: Macedon
  - Federal division: McEwen
- Elevation: 484 m (1,588 ft)

Population
  - Total: 645 (2016 census)
- Postcode: 3437
Localities around Bullengarook
Trentham	Woodend	Macedon
	Bullengarook	Gisborne
	Bacchus Marsh

Bullengarook /bəˈlʌŋɡərʊk/ is a locality in Victoria, Australia. The locality is centred on Bacchus Marsh Road, 14 kilometres (9 mi) west of Gisborne and 19 km north of Bacchus Marsh. Bullengarook is in the Shire of Macedon Ranges local government area. At the 2011 Census, Bullengarook and the surrounding area had a population of 603. Mount Bullengarook, the Lerderderg State Park and the headwaters of Coimadai Creek are found to the south of the township.

== Facilities ==
The community is a small one. The local primary school closed down in 2007 when the number of enrolled students fell below twenty. The school has since been repurposed as a second campus of the Sunbury & Macedon Specialist School

There is a Country Fire Authority fire station and a Recreation Reserve. The Reserve land was donated to the Shire council by a local land owner and now provides a number of community facilities including but not limited to a tennis club, cricket ground facilities, a pavilion available to the public for rental and equestrian facilities for the local children's pony club and adult riders clubs.

There are no commercial facilities.

The nearest railway station is located in New Gisborne on the Bendigo railway line. The line was constructed between 1858 and 1861.

== History ==
The local lands were inhabited by the Wurundjeri people.

Earliest records show that Europeans settled in the area in 1850. Industry included slate and gold mining. Bullengarook Post Office opened on 24 February 1868 and the Bullengarook East office opened on 15 April 1880. Bullengarook closed in 1950; in 1972 Bullengarook East was renamed Bullengarook, closing in 1976.

The local Bullengarook Bellows newspaper is still in production.
