= Shire of Newham and Woodend =

Coordinates: 37°22′S 144°32′E

- Local government area
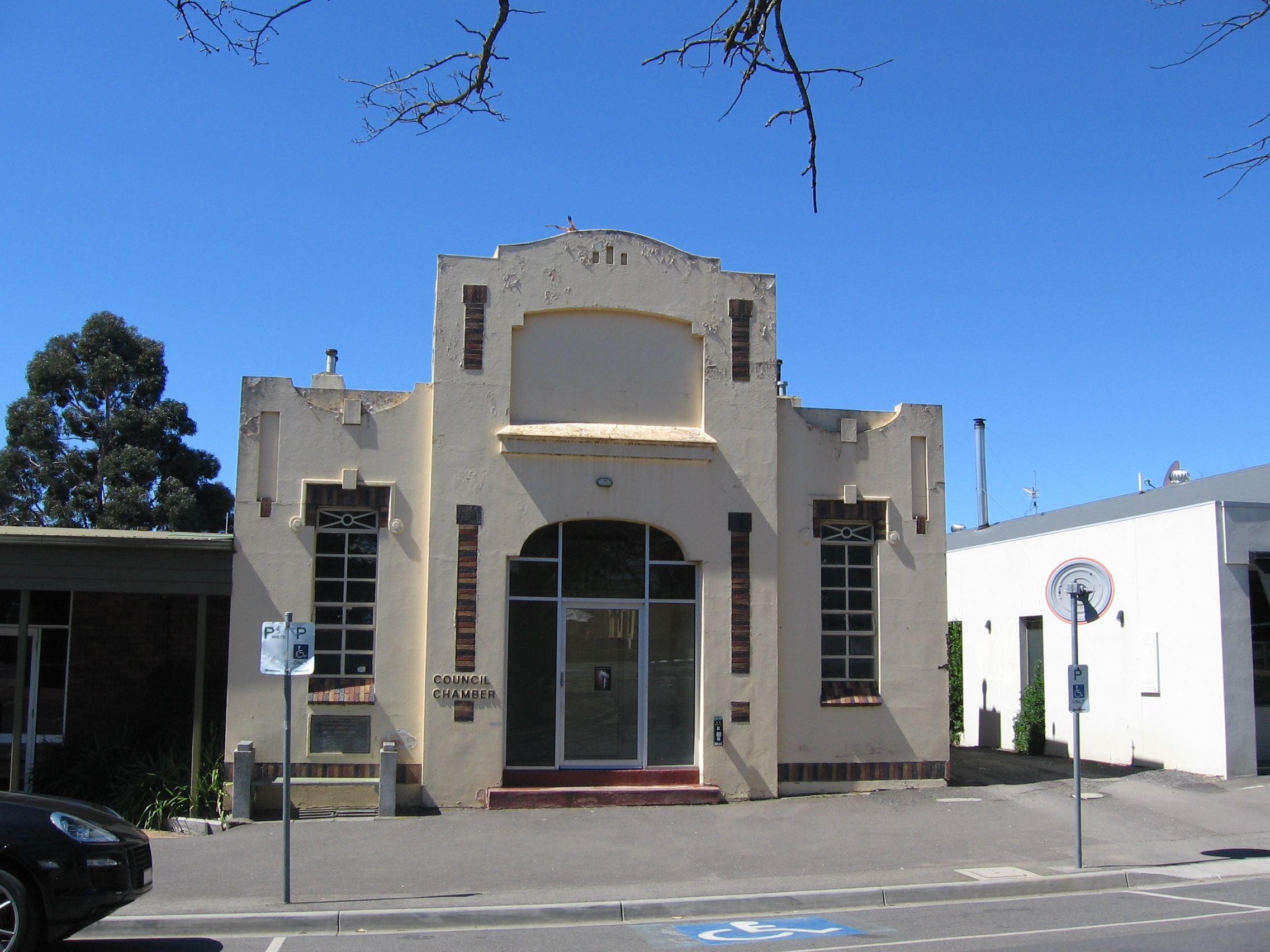
- Former Council chambers in Woodend

- The Shire of Newham and Woodend as at its dissolution in 1995
- Country: Australia
- State: Victoria
- Region: North Central Victoria
- Established: 1861
- Council seat: Woodend

Area
  - Total: 246.05 km^{2} (95.00 sq mi)

Population
  - Total(s): 5,560 (1992)
  - Density: 22.597/km^{2} (58.53/sq mi)
- County: Bourke, Dalhousie
LGAs around Shire of Newham and Woodend
Kyneton	Kyneton	Pyalong
Kyneton	Shire of Newham and Woodend	Romsey
Bacchus Marsh	Gisborne	Romsey

The Shire of Newham and Woodend was a local government area about 70 kilometres (43 mi) northwest of Melbourne, the state capital of Victoria, Australia. The shire covered an area of 246.05 square kilometres (95.0 sq mi), and existed from 1861 until 1995.

== History ==
The Woodend, Newham and Rochford Road District was incorporated on 3 December 1861, and became the Shire of Newham on 6 April 1871. Following its union with the Borough of Woodend on 11 January 1905, it became the Shire of Newham and Woodend.

On 19 January 1995, the Shire of Newham and Woodend was abolished, and along with the Shires of Gisborne, Kyneton and Romsey, was merged into the newly created Shire of Macedon Ranges.

== Wards ==
Newham and Woodend was divided into three ridings on 7 May 1953, each of which elected three councillors:

- Campaspe Riding
- Newham Riding
- Woodend Riding

== Towns and localities ==
- Ashbourne
- Cadello
- Campaspe
- Cobaw
- Hanging Rock
- Hesket
- Mount Macedon (parts)
- Newham
- Woodend*
- Woodend North

* Council seat.

== Population ==
Year	Population
1954	2,058
1958	2,150*
1961	2,102
1966	1,995
1971	2,092
1976	2,394
1981	3,404
1986	4,346
1991	5,238

* Estimate in the 1958 Victorian Year Book.
