= Shire of Romsey =

Coordinates: 37°21′S 144°45′E

- Local government area
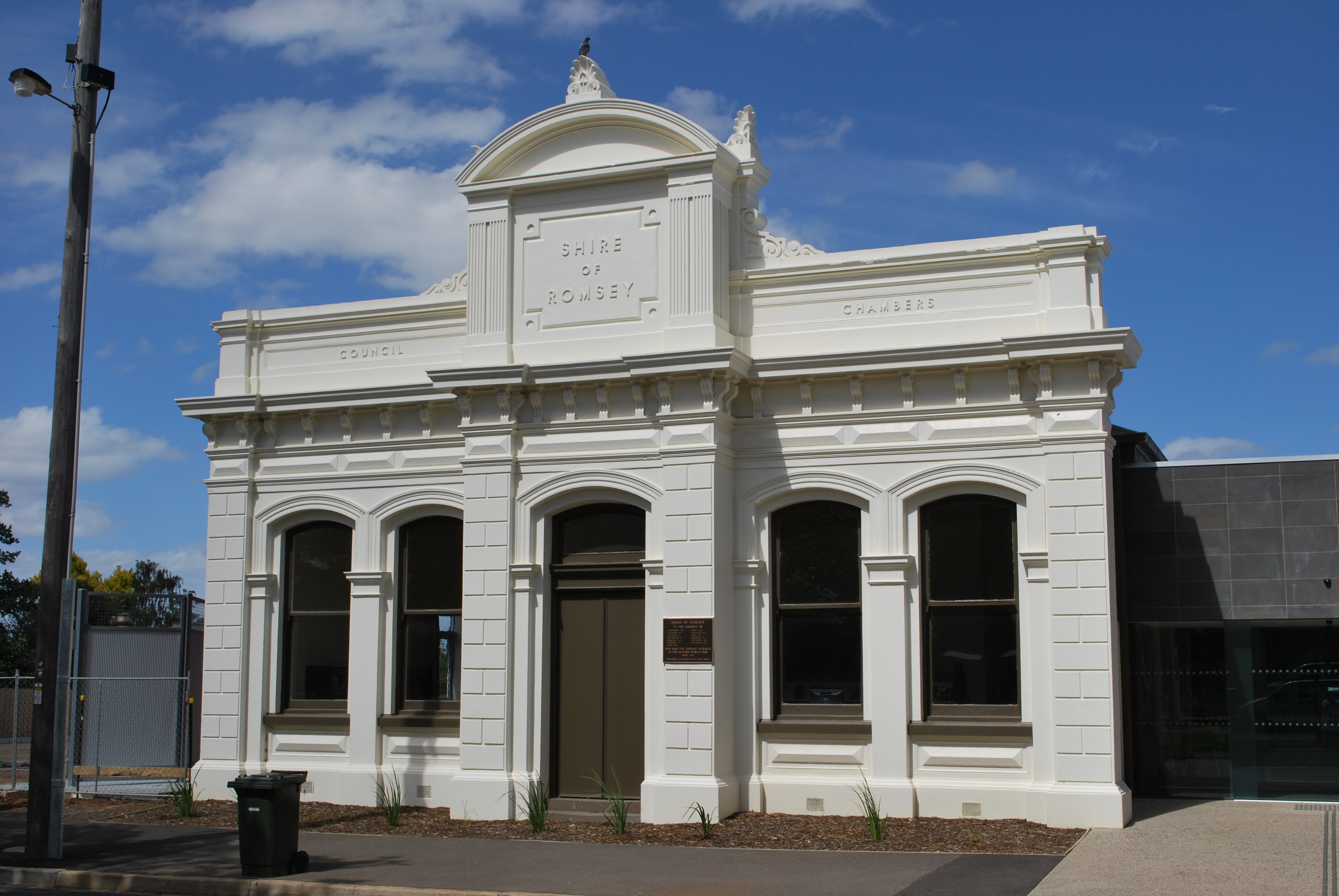
- Former Shire of Romsey Council Chambers

- The Shire of Romsey as at its dissolution in 1995
- Country: Australia
- State: Victoria
- Region: North Central Victoria
- Established: 1862
- Council seat: Romsey

Area
  - Total: 628 km^{2} (242 sq mi)

Population
  - Total(s): 8,350 (1992)
  - Density: 13.296/km^{2} (34.44/sq mi)
- County: Bourke
LGAs around Shire of Romsey
Kyneton	Pyalong	Pyalong
Newham and Woodend	Shire of Romsey	Kilmore
Gisborne	Bulla	Bulla

The Shire of Romsey was a local government area about 65 kilometres (40 mi) north-north-west of Melbourne, the state capital of Victoria, Australia. The shire covered an area of 628 square kilometres (242.5 sq mi), and existed from 1862 until 1995.

== History ==
Romsey was incorporated as a road district on 5 August 1862, and became a shire on 16 June 1871.

On 10 January 1890, the Shire of Lancefield was created from parts of the Lancefield and Rochford Ridings. However, it and the Shire of Springfield were united with Romsey on 31 May 1916. Parts of Romsey was annexed to the Shire of Kilmore on 28 May 1958.

On 19 January 1995, the Shire of Romsey was abolished, and along with the Shires of Gisborne, Kyneton and Newham and Woodend, was merged into the newly created Shire of Macedon Ranges.

== Wards ==
The Shire of Romsey was divided into four ridings on 7 February 1978, each of which elected three councillors:

- Central Riding
- Lancefield Riding
- Riddell Riding
- Romsey Riding

== Towns and localities ==
- Cherokee
- Clarkefield
- Darraweit Guim
- Kerrie
- Lancefield
- Monegeetta
- Mount William
- Riddells Creek
- Rochford
- Romsey*
- Springfield
- Tantarraboo

* Council seat.

== Population ==
Year	Population
1954	2,813
1958	2,840*
1961	2,636
1966	2,516
1971	2,575
1976	3,155
1981	4,547
1986	5,992
1991	7,842

* Estimate in the 1958 Victorian Year Book.
