= Baynton, Victoria =

Baynton Victoria
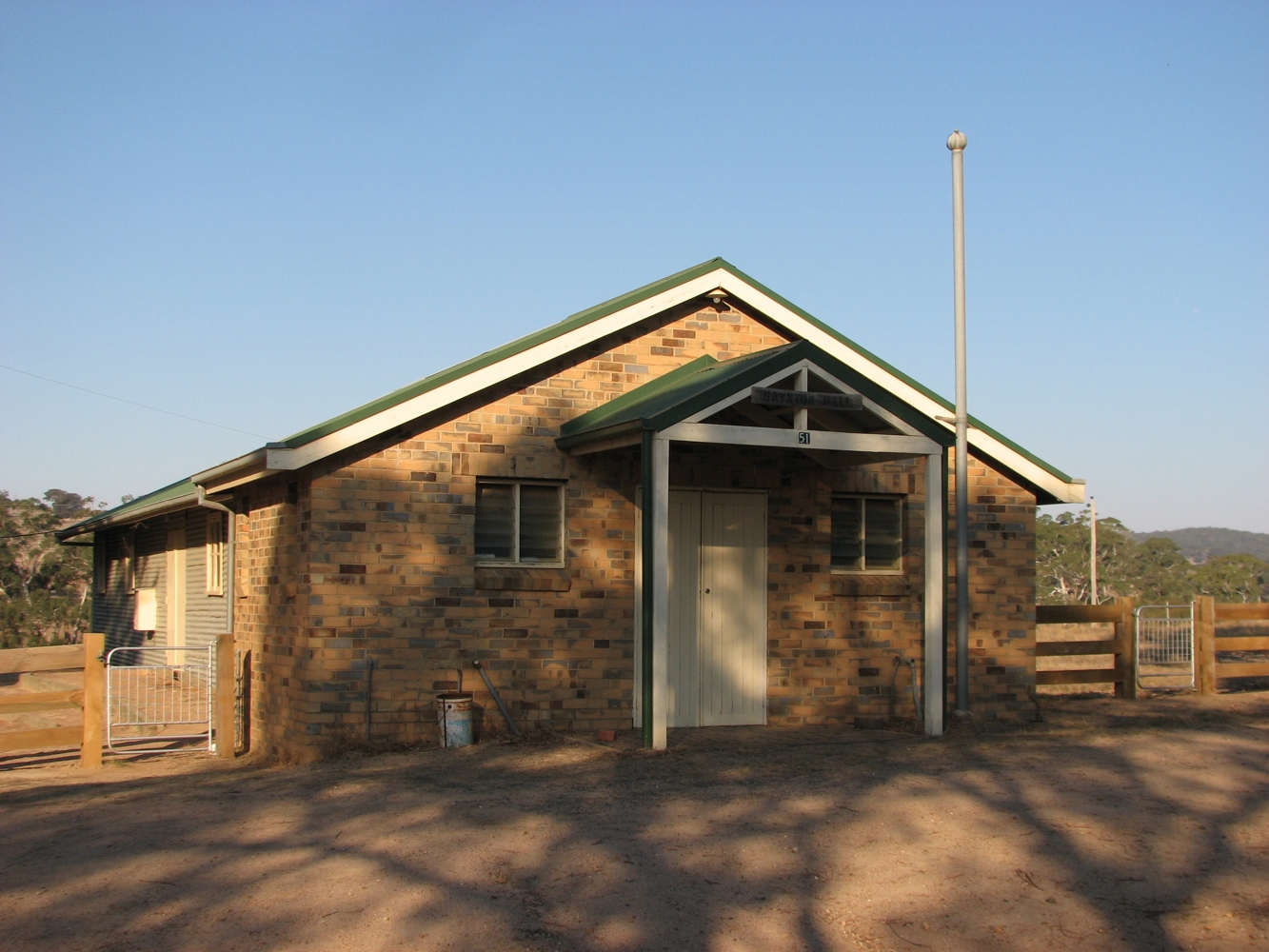
- Baynton Hall, 2008

- Coordinates: 37°8′S 144°40′E
- Population: 202 (2011 census)
- Postcode(s): 3444
- Elevation: 550 m (1,804 ft)
- Location: 90 km (56 mi) N of Melbourne; 20 km (12 mi) NE of Kyneton; 20 km (12 mi) NW of Lancefield
- LGA(s): Shire of Macedon Ranges
- State electorate(s): Macedon
- Federal division(s): Bendigo
Mean max temp	Mean min temp	Annual rainfall
19.8 °C; 68 °F	7.3 °C; 45 °F	675 mm 26.6 in

Baynton is a locality in central Victoria, Australia. Baynton is approximately 20 km (12 mi) north-east of Kyneton, and 20 km (12 mi) north-west of Lancefield. Baynton's elevation varies from 450 to 650 metres (1,475–2,130 ft) above sea level, and annual rainfall averages 675 millimetres (26.6 in).

Agriculturally, the region produces wool, lamb, beef and wine. It is home to several wineries, and tourism has become an important component of the region's economy.

== History ==
The Baynton has been occupied by Aboriginal people for thousands of years, and was the approximate meeting point of lands inhabited by the Dja Dja Wurrung, Taungurong, and Woiwurrung peoples. Trading between them was almost certainly an important activity, because tachylite deposits near Spring Hill and the Coliban River were used to create stone tools that have been found in many places in Victoria.

European settlement began in the 1830s with the arrival of Captain Sylvester Brown, who travelled overland with livestock from Sydney to set up an agricultural enterprise in Baynton. His residence, however, was short-lived, and he was followed by a succession of landholders including Dr. Thomas Baynton, the Polhman brothers, Martin McKenna (first president of the Shire of Kyneton) and J.B. Thomson.

Baynton is named after Thomas Baynton, whose extensive station was named "Darlington". Although the original homestead no longer remains, Darlington continues to be a significant local property.

One notable event in the history of Baynton was the passing of the Burke and Wills expedition in 1860, and its departure from Baynton was recorded by the expedition artist Ludwig Becker, whose sketch is housed at the State Library Victoria. Local resident J.B. Thomson alleged he joined Burke and Wills with the intention of travelling with them to northern Australia, but abandoned the party in Echuca, describing the expedition as "reckless and bound to failure".

Bushranger Ned Kelly is fabled to have stolen a horse from the public house opposite the Baynton Racecourse. Local legend says the horse's owner, J.B. Thomson, bet on a race with a stranger to the district, and when he won, they two went for a drink. The stranger then stepped out to check his horse, but did not return, stealing the faster horse, and disappearing from the district. He was later found to be none other than Ned Kelly.

Baynton township developed in the 1860s and the post office opened on 24 January 1867, closing in 1959.

== Baynton today ==
At its height as an identifiable town, Baynton was home to three schools, a church, two public houses and a cobbler's shop. Today, only the hall remains, which is used for community meetings and events. The Baynton Church, which was built in the late 19th century and rebuilt in the 1960s, was destroyed in the Black Saturday bushfires of 2009, and was not rebuilt.

Baynton remains a close-knit agricultural community, with the main enterprises including sheep, cattle, wine production and commercial forestry. The Baynton Hall, established in the early 1960s, is the home of the Baynton Film Society, and screens an Australian-based movie each year, on or around Australia Day. The Baynton-Sidonia Landcare group is active in working toward sustainable land management in the region.

Due to the relative absence of residential subdivision in the Baynton area, it remains one of the most intact farming areas in the Macedon Ranges area. In April 2012, there were celebrations for the 50th anniversary of the Baynton Hall, and a book of the history of Baynton was launched.

Baynton has been recognised as possibly the most well signposted place which does not exist as a recognisable town, due to the number of prominent signs directing to Baynton.

== People of note ==
Thomas Alexander Browne, who wrote under the pseudonym Rolf Boldrewood, was an early Australian writer, and author of the novel Robbery Under Arms. Browne was the son of Captain Sylvester Brown, and was a resident of Baynton as a young boy. Walker Thomson, who was born and raised in Baynton, was a member of the Australian forces in the South African War (1899–1902). He was involved in the siege of Mafeking and became a friend of General Robert Baden-Powell.
