= Woodend North =

- Town
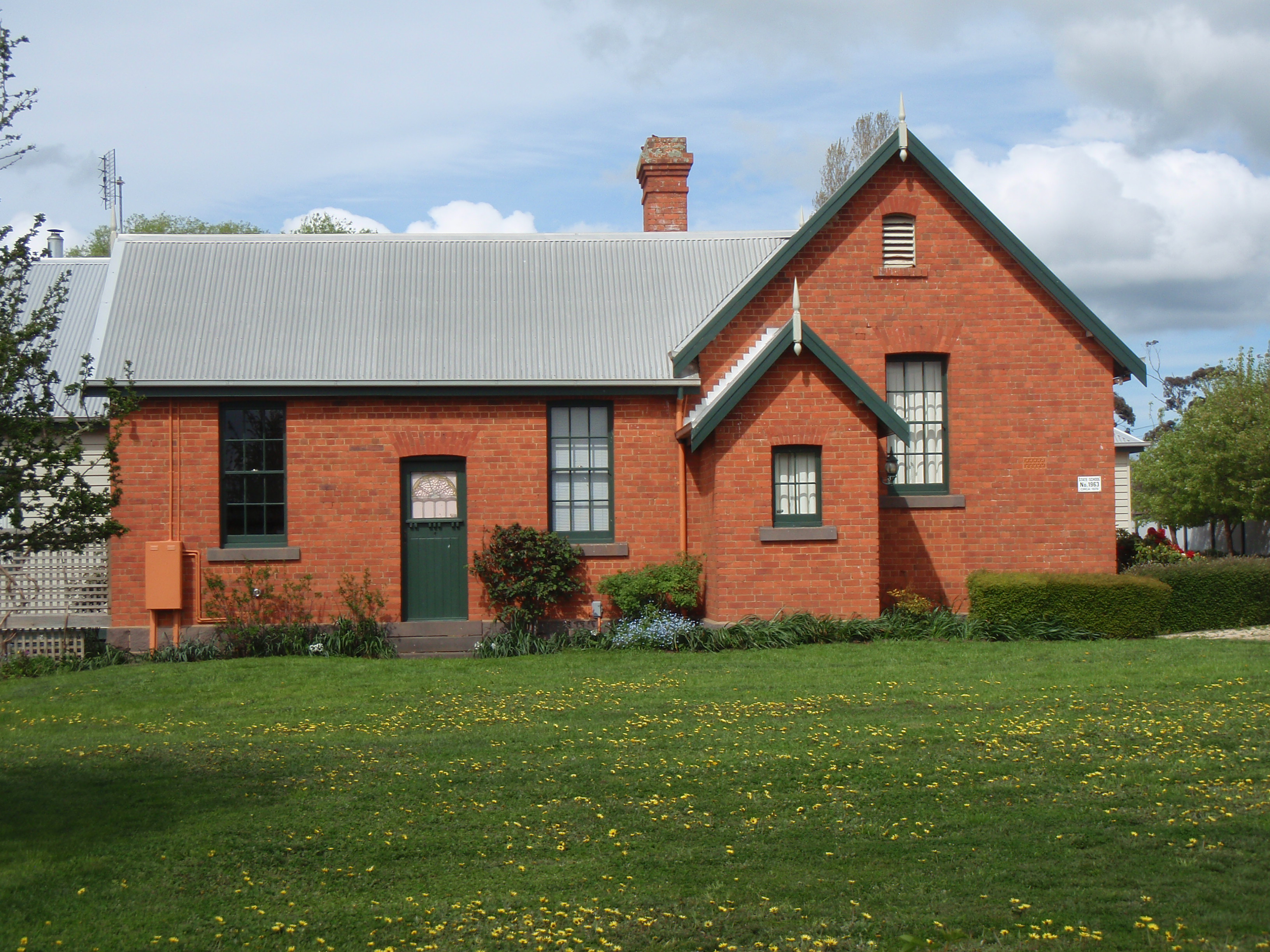
- The former Woodend North State School

- Coordinates: 37°19′S 144°32′E
- Country: Australia
- State: Victoria
- LGA: Shire of Macedon Ranges
- Location: 4 km (2.5 mi) from Woodend, Victoria; 72 km (45 mi) from Melbourne

Government
  - State electorate: Macedon
  - Federal division: McEwen
- Elevation: 550 m (1,800 ft)

Population
  - Total: 313 (2006 census)
- Postcode: 3442
Localities around Woodend North
Carlsruhe	Cadello	Cobaw
Tylden	Woodend North	Newham and Hanging Rock
Ashbourne	Woodend	Mount Macedon

Woodend North (traditionally North Woodend) is a locality 4 km north of Woodend, Victoria in the Shire of Macedon Ranges in central Victoria, Australia. Formerly a distinct locality, Woodend North has effectively become the northern extension of the township of Woodend. The locality is now a mainly residential and agricultural area, with some light secondary industrial sites. At the 2006 census, Woodend North had a population of 313.

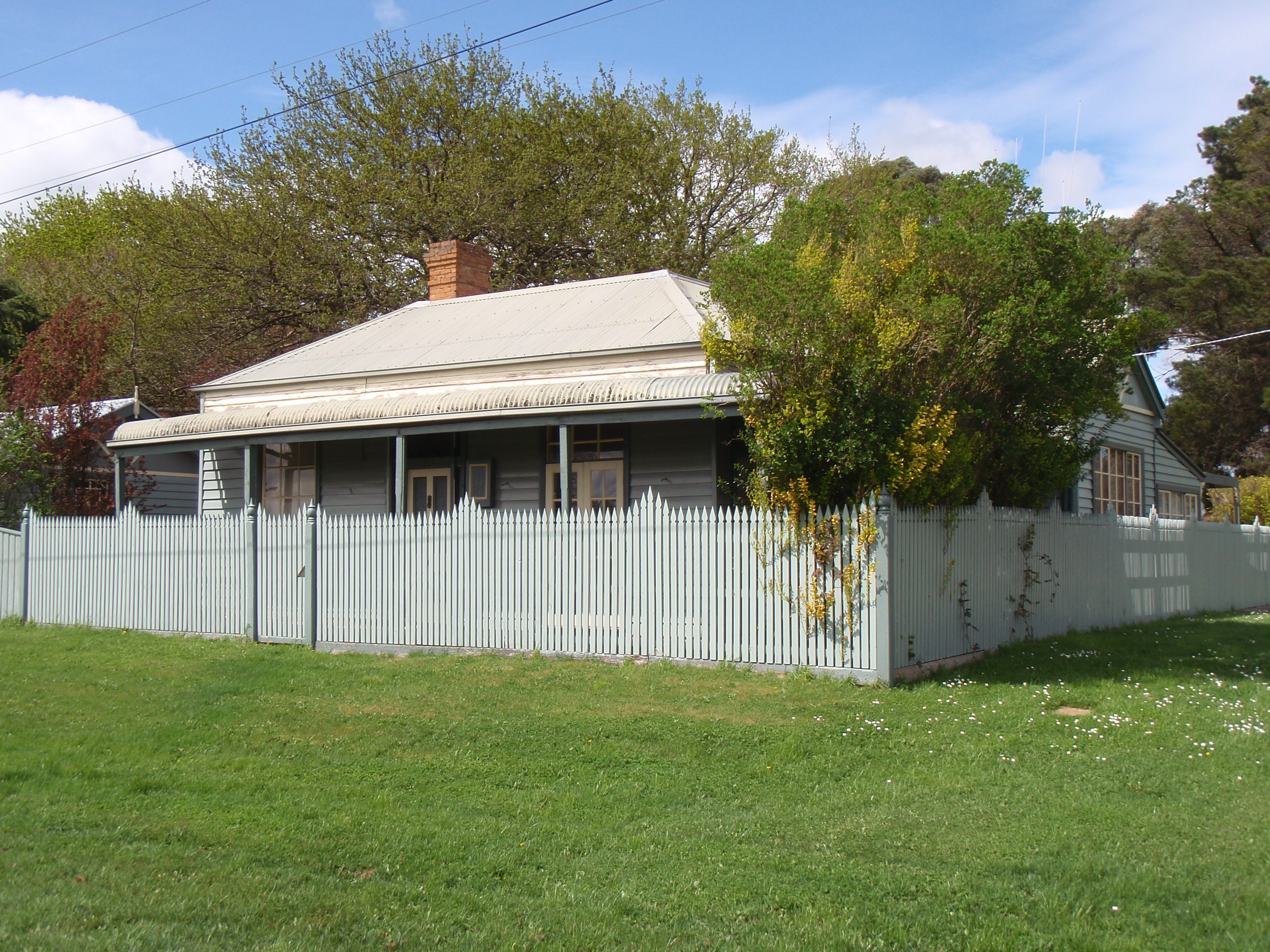
Former Springfield Hotel

== History ==
Woodend North was originally known as Springfield, supposedly in reference to natural springs in the area. The name seems to have been changed due to postal confusion with another Springfield office near Romsey.

The settlement formerly consisted of the Post Office, State School, a general store, a blacksmith, and Patterson's (flour) Mill, all of which are now closed. Further, Woodend North featured three licensed hotels, the Springfield, Highland Chief and Dalhousie. The Post Office opened as Springfield on 11 November 1862, was renamed Woodend North on 8 September 1884, and closed on 31 January 1958. The former Woodend North State School remains standing as a privately owned residence.
