= Newham Rural Fire Brigade =

Newham Fire Brigade
- Established: 25 August 1969
- Headquarters: 29 Lockwood Road, Kangaroo Flat, VIC 3555, Australia (CFA District 02 HQ)
- Location(s): Outer Metro Norwest Area Newham, Victoria
- Region served: 2
- Services: Wildfire and low structure fire
- Captain: Bryan Hornbuckle
- Staff: No paid staff
- Volunteers: 25+

The Newham Fire Brigade is a volunteer firefighting service located in Newham, Victoria at 1293 Rochford Road. The brigade is often referred to as the Newham CFA and was formerly known as the Newham Rural Fire Brigade. The brigade is part of the Mount Macedon Group in the Lodden-Mallee Region of the Country Fire Authority. Newham is located in the Macedon Ranges, which is one of Victoria's popular holiday spots and has a risk of bushfire during the summer months.

Since its beginnings in the 1930s, the Newham community has developed the brigade's modern firefighting operations in a history that typifies the CFA's volunteerism.

== History ==
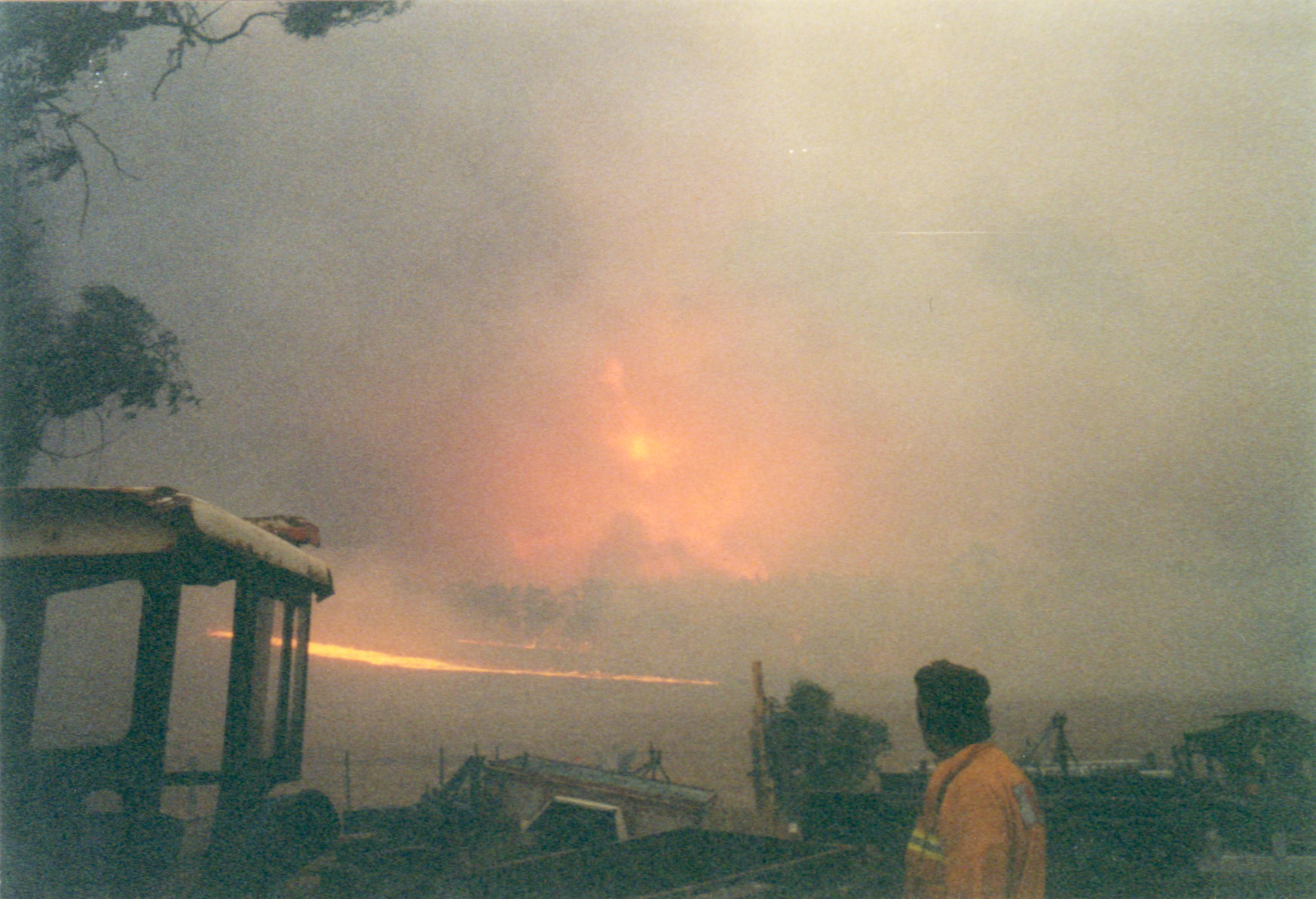
A member of the Newham Fire Brigade attending the 7 February 2009 Black Saturday fires at Kilmore East, Victoria

In 1936 four Newham residents were among the volunteers who joined in the formation of the Woodend Bush Fire Brigade. These first volunteers were W. A. Crozier, W Campbell, A. B. Trewhalla and W. J. Muir.

On 19 March 1957, a public meeting elected officers to form a Newham branch of the Woodend Rural Fire Brigade. Funds were raised for the original appliance: a roll-on, roll-off Furphy tank of 180 gallons, with a motor and pump, which was loaded from a stand on to local farmer's trucks. This unit was completed in 1957. Organisation later began to erect a fire station and construction was completed in 1960.

During 1961 the tank unit was converted into a trailer-type unit, build up by the local volunteers on a truck axle assembly. As the brigade at this time was a branch, it was ineligible for equipment from the Country Fire Authority.

In 1963 the Newham branch actively participated in the fund raising for Woodend's new VHF wireless sets, and the CFA promised a new motor and pump to replace the failing, public subscribed one on the trailer unit. After discussions with the CFA regarding further equipment for the Newham branch, and the realisation that as a branch Newham had the maximum equipment that could be allocated, the volunteers agreed in 1969 to investigate the possibility of the Newham branch being formed into a brigade.

In July 1969 at a meeting in Newham, it was resolved that the Newham Fire Brigade become a separate entity under the auspices of the Country Fire Authority. The brigade was registered by the Country Fire Authority as a "B" class brigade on the 25 August 1969. Late in 1969 a secondhand truck was purchased for $500 from community donations and the CFA provided a 400-gallon tank, motor and pump to equip it as a fire truck. A VHF mobile transceiver was purchased for $500 giving the brigade an efficiently equipped unit.

== Notable Incidents ==
Over the years, the brigade has been involved in a number of major Bushfires in Victoria, including:

- The Ashbourne Fire, 13 January 1936
- The Mount Macedon Ash Wednesday fires in 1983
- The defence of the towns of Falls Creek, Harrietville and Ensay in the 2003 Eastern Victorian alpine bushfires
- The Victorian Alps Fire Complex in 2006–2007
- Defending homes along Saunders Road and Sunday Creek Road in Kilmore East during the Black Saturday bushfires on 7 February 2009. Newham's Tanker was one of the first responding appliances
- The Brigade has also supported NSW and SA firefighters as far afield as Tenterfield NSW and Kangaroo Island in SA.

== Present Operations ==
The Newham Fire Brigade is crewed exclusively by volunteers raised from a community of approximately 300 households. The brigade has approximately 40 active qualified firefighters, some of whom are self-contained breathing apparatus operators. The brigade was supported by a Ladies' Auxiliary, which was later subsumed into the brigade to reflect modern societal standards. The support provided by the Ladies' Auxiliary is now provided by members within the brigade.

The brigade appliances are a Hino Ranger 2000-litre 2.4D tanker, a Hino 500 Series 2000-litre 2.4C tanker and a Toyota Landcruiser 400-litre slip-on. The slip-on is used for areas which are inaccessible by the larger appliances and on small fire tracks.

Current responsibilities are suppression of wildfire in Hanging Rock Reserve, the Cobaw State Forest and in surrounding grasslands; and low structure fire in an increasingly populated rural community. Between 2004 and 2012, population growth in the Macedon Ranges Shire was substantially higher (12%) than in regional Victoria as a whole (7.5%) and in metropolitan Melbourne (9%). There is an expected change in the age structure of the Shire with people over 50 years of age becoming a substantially higher proportion of the population.

A responsibility of the Newham Fire Brigade is fire suppression at Hanging Rock Reserve. This is a bushland venue of many events during summer that attracts a large number of visitors. These events include New Years Day Races, Australia Day Races, Labor Day Races and the Harvest Picnic. The Newham Fire Brigade had 41 turnouts in 2009.

== See also ==
- Index of firefighting articles
- Junior firefighter
- Glossary of firefighting terms. A list of firefighting terms and acronyms.
- Women in firefighting
