= Lauriston, Victoria =

Lauriston Victoria
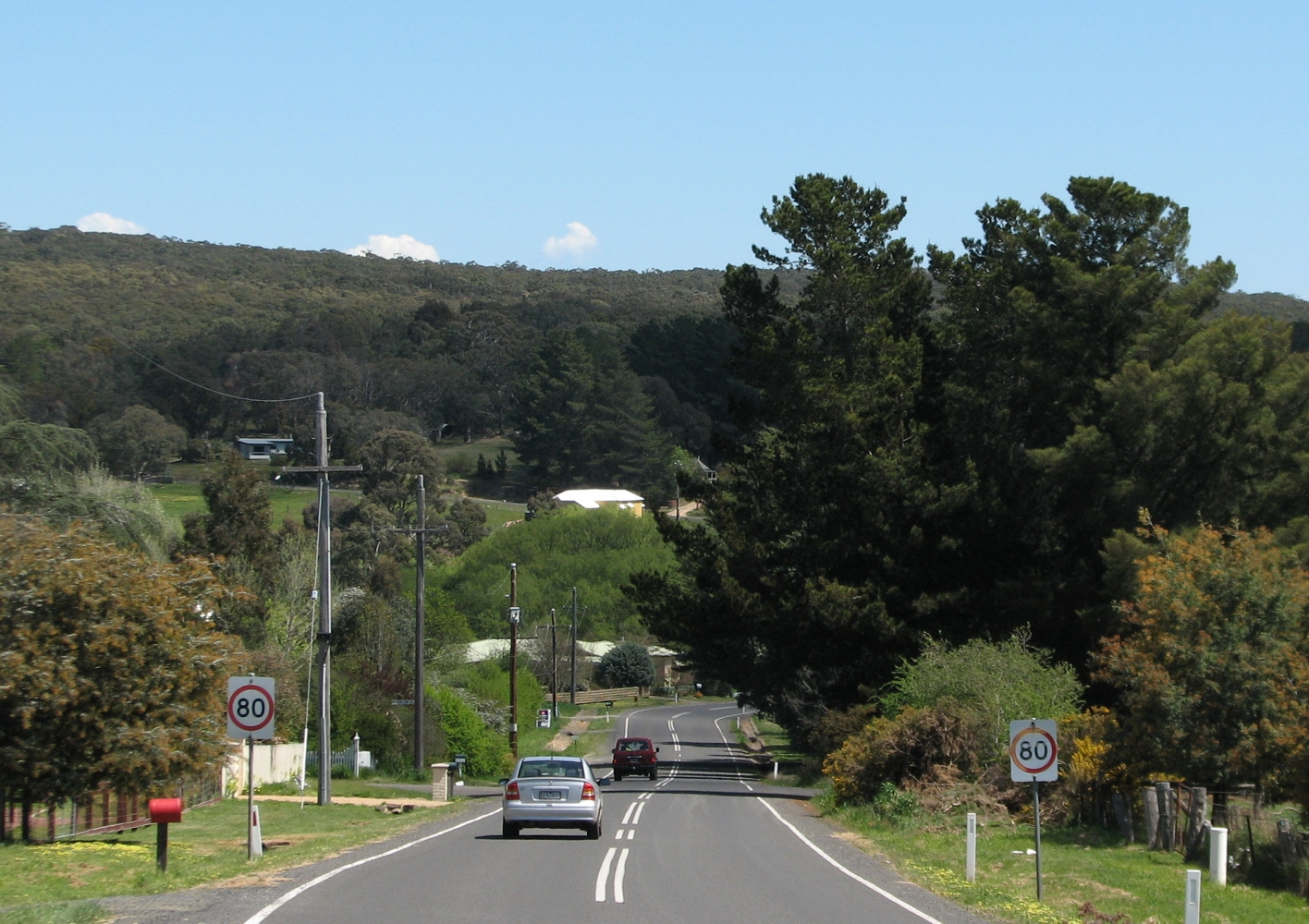
- Lauriston Road

- Coordinates: 37°15′S 144°23′E
- Population: 236 (2016 census)
- Postcode(s): 3444
- Location: 91 km (57 mi) NW of Melbourne; 65 km (40 mi) S of Bendigo; 8 km (5 mi) W of Kyneton
- LGA(s): Shire of Macedon Ranges
- State electorate(s): Macedon
- Federal division(s): Bendigo
Localities around Lauriston:
Denver	Kyneton	Kyneton
Denver	Lauriston	Woodend North
Spring Hill	Tylden	Woodend

Lauriston is a locality in Victoria, Australia. It is situated on the Coliban River, in a gully 8 kilometres (5 mi) west of Kyneton. The Lauriston Reservoir, (which serves Kyneton), is 2 kilometres (1 mi) south east of the town.

At the 2016 census, Lauriston had a population of 236.

Lauriston Post Office opened on 1 July 1864 after gold was discovered in the area and closed in 1969. In 2019 Australian folk musician, Alana Wilkinson, recorded a single, "Partner in Crime", at the community's church.
