= Bronowski Institute of Behavioural Neuroscience =

Medical research institute in Australia

- Logo: Ancient Greek Psi, Neuros, Logos centred on the broken symbol for infinity
- Motto: Science in the service of humanity
- Founders: Dr. Gregory L. Willis; Elizabeth J. Chapman
- Established: 1991; 35 years ago
- Mission: Medical research
- Focus: Biomedical Science; Biological Science; Behavioural Neuroscience; Comparative Neuroethology; Environmental Toxicology
- Director: Dr. Gregory L. Willis
- Location: Macedon Ranges, Victoria, Australia
- Website: www.bronowski.org

The Bronowski Institute of Behavioural Neuroscience is an Australian independent not-for-profit medical research institute that is financially supported entirely by philanthropy, that undertakes clinical and basic research into disorders of brain function and addresses problems of altered biological function in animals and man.

It is fully licensed by state and federal governing bodies to undertake scientific research. As funding has been provided by private means, the Institute can be referred to as an Independent Research Organisation (IRO) and the founder, Dr. Gregory Willis, an independent scientist.

The research laboratories are located in the State of Victoria, in the Macedon Ranges, north of Melbourne, with The Bronowski Clinic operating in Woodend and at the Coliban Medical Centre in Kyneton. Projects covering a diversity of areas in behavioural biology are carried out with research staff, collaborators and students from academic institutions within Australia and overseas.

== History ==
The Bronowski Institute of Behavioural Neuroscience was established in 1991 in response to a perceived need for scientists to be able to undertake important work in the absence of reliable support from funding bodies and governments. After more than a decade of research and teaching at the Monash University Department of Psychiatry at Prince Henry’s Hospital, the founder set out to establish premises and obtain funding to investigate the cause and treatment of Parkinson's disease and to undertake research in other areas of biological science.

The original work was undertaken at a very modest facility which underwent gradual conversion from 1991 to the present. Personal investment by the founder, and allied supporters, has been the key behind transformation of the facility from little more than a shed to modern premises where significant discoveries have been published in major biomedical journals.

== Research organisation ==
Self-funding by scientists was common in the post-renaissance period and up until the 20th century. After this time (circa 1900), governments and universities took on the responsibility of funding major research. By definition, independent scientist are defined as those pursuing scientific study without direct affiliation with or funding from universities, government institutions or granting bodies. It is a rare phenomenon for a self-funding scientist to form a bona fide IRO without traditional means of financial support. The ability to achieve this varies from culture to culture, being particularly difficult in countries such as Australia where tertiary education is more socialised.

Seven years after inaugural work commenced at the Bronowski Institute of Behavioural Neuroscience, significant funding was received from an independent source to aid in the development of a novel class of drugs for treating Parkinson's disease. Continued work led to subsequent discoveries in the areas of circadian function and Parkinson's disease, supported by funding from private sources in Australia, the United States and Europe.

In 1996, The Bronowski Clinic was established on the basis of findings from preclinical models of experimental Parkinson's disease showing that exposure to 24 hours of light enhanced recovery from the disease. Due to the non-invasive nature of the treatment, a science-based program for light administration in Parkinson's disease was developed with more than 250 patients treated at the Clinic to date, with many travelling from around Australia, the United States and Europe to be treated. A double blind, randomized, placebo controlled trial was just completed in Australia. Justification for such trials arises from work that was undertaken exclusively at the Bronowski research laboratories and The Bronowski Clinic and published in major biomedical journals.

== Achievements, advances and directions ==
The major advances made at The Bronowski Institute have emerged from the concept that Parkinson's disease is a disease of the retina. The Institute has undertaken numerous studies demonstrating that Parkinson's disease begins in, progresses from and can be treated from the retina. This finding has been the impetus of successful ongoing collaborations in Australia, the United States and Japan. This has also led to the speculation that melatonin is toxic, and that dopamine overdosing during chemotherapy presents a major problem in treating Parkinson's disease. This work has also been instrumental to the development of non-invasive treatments that involve the eye and to recent work attempting to reduce the total drug burden contributing to polypharmacy, life-threatening adverse effects and poor quality of life.

Additional areas of study at The Bronowski Institute include behavioural and neuroendocrine studies in comparative neuroethology as well as issues relating to environmental toxicology.

As an IRO, The Bronowski Institute has provided work-study programs, partial stipends and full scholarships to enable current and prospective students to study and learn advanced research techniques and it also provides funding for international scientists to engage in collaborative work.

== See also ==
- Health in Australia
