= Little Coliban River =

Little Coliban
- Location of the Coliban River mouth in Victoria

Location
- Country: Australia
- State: Victoria
- Region: Riverina bioregion (IBRA), Central Highlands
- Local government area: Macedon Ranges

Physical characteristics
- Source: Great Dividing Range
  - location: below Goodfellows Hill, near Tylden
  - coordinates: 37°19′56″S 144°24′45″E
  - elevation: 574 m (1,883 ft)
- Mouth: confluence with the Coliban River
  - location: Upper Coliban Reservoir
  - coordinates: 37°17′27″S 144°23′55″E
  - elevation: 501 m (1,644 ft)
- Length: 12 km (7.5 mi)

Basin features
- River system: Victorian north–central catchment, Murray-Darling basin
- Reservoir: Upper Coliban Reservoir

The Little Coliban River, a minor inland perennial river of the north–central catchment, part of the Murray-Darling basin, is located in the lower Riverina bioregion and Central Highlands region of the Australian state of Victoria. The headwaters of the Little Coliban River rise on the northern slopes of the Great Dividing Range and descend to flow north into the Coliban River within the impounded Upper Coliban Reservoir.

== Location and features ==
The river rises below Goodfellows Hill near Tylden in the Great Dividing Range and flows generally north, before reaching its confluence with the Coliban River within the Upper Coliban Reservoir. The river descends 73 metres (240 ft) over its 12-kilometre (7.5 mi) course.

== See also ==
- List of rivers of Australia § Victoria
