= Allan Mummery =

Australian rules footballer, born 1916

Personal information
- Full name: Allan John Mummery
- Born: 10 May 1916; Myrtleford, Victoria
- Died: 16 February 1966 (aged 49); Woodend, Victoria
- Original team: Myrtleford
- Height: 178 cm (5 ft 10 in)
- Weight: 83 kg (183 lb)

Playing career^{1}
Years	Club	Games (Goals)
1945	St Kilda	2 (0)
- ^{1} Playing statistics correct to the end of 1945.

Allan John Mummery (10 May 1916 – 16 February 1966) was an Australian rules footballer who played for the St Kilda Football Club in the Victorian Football League (VFL).

== Death ==
He died at Woodend, Victoria on 16 February 1966.
