= Carlsruhe, Victoria =

Carlsruhe
- Town
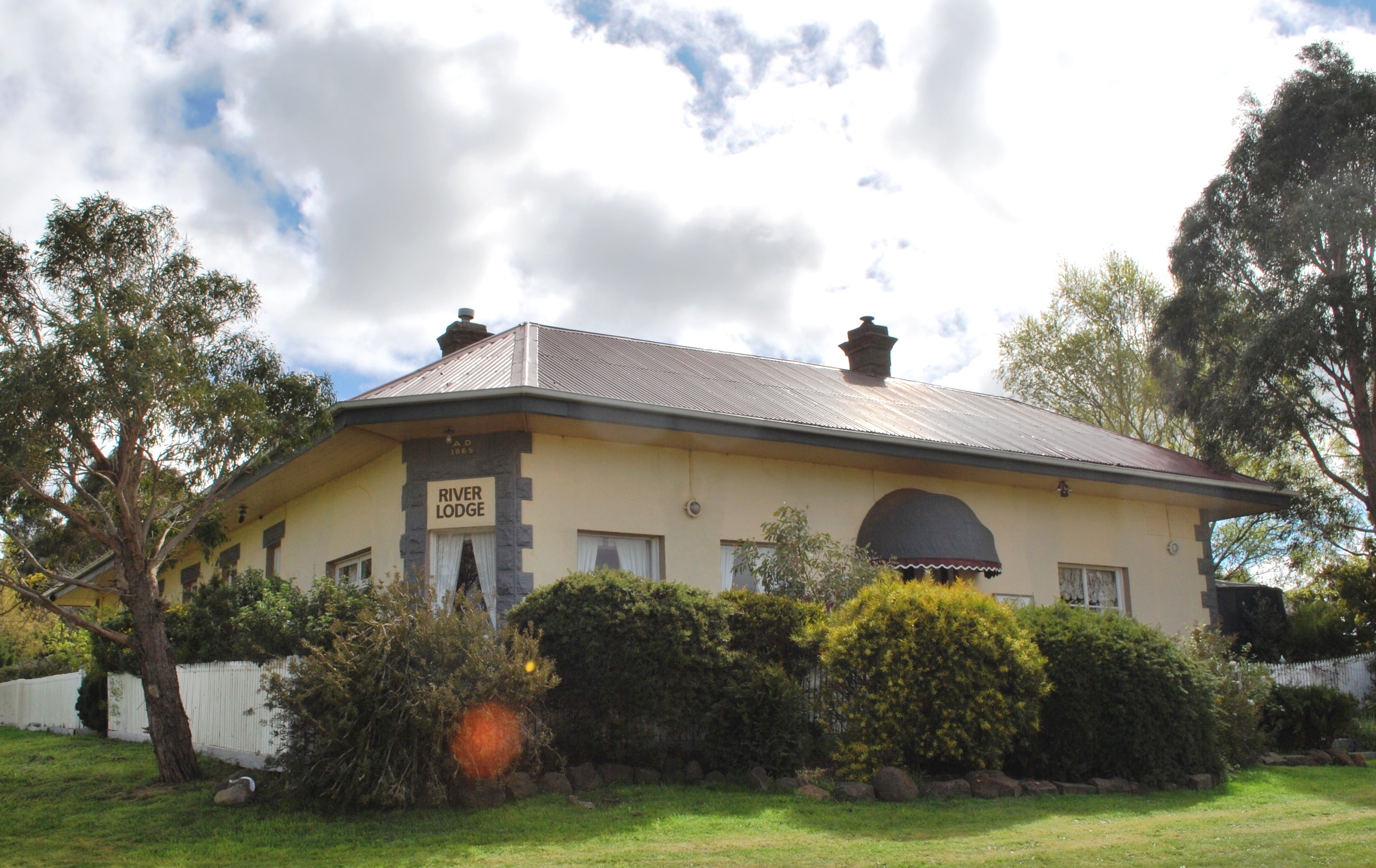
- "River Lodge" at Carlsruhe, 2009

- Interactive map of Carlsruhe
- Coordinates: 37°17′S 144°30′E
- Country: Australia
- State: Victoria
- LGA: Shire of Macedon Ranges
- Location: 80 km (50 mi) NW of Melbourne; 74 km (46 mi) S of Bendigo; 11 km (6.8 mi) NW of Woodend; 6 km (3.7 mi) SE of Kyneton

Government
  - State electorate: Macedon
  - Federal division: Bendigo, McEwen
- Elevation: 526 m (1,726 ft)

Population
  - Total: 456 (2011 census)
- Postcode: 3442
Localities around Carlsruhe
Kyneton	Kyneton	Benloch
Kyneton	Carlsruhe	Newham
Lauriston	Woodend North	Newham

Carlsruhe (/ˈkɑːrlzruː/) is a town in the Shire of Macedon Ranges between Woodend and Kyneton, alongside the old Calder Highway, although now bypassed by the Calder Freeway. It is approximately 50 minutes by road from both Melbourne and Bendigo. At the 2011 census, Carlsruhe and the surrounding area had a population of 456.

== History ==
Charles Ebden became the first European to settle in Carlsruhe whan he established himself at Sugarloaf Creek, Victoria on about 14 March 1837. He named the location after Karlsruhe, Germany, where he had received part of his education. Carlsruhe was the second inland settlement in the Port Phillip District.

Although Carlsruhe is named after the German city, the Australian pronunciation of the name is very different from its German counterpart because, in German, the final "e" is pronounced separately whereas, in English, the "e" it is silent. The German pronunciation is "Carls-ruh-e".

Carlsruhe has a graveyard with many tombstones dating back to the 19th century.

A township was established in the 1850s. The post office opened on 1 September 1854, closed after a few months and reopened in 1858. After the railway arrived in 1862, Carlsruhe Railway Station post office opened some distance away, in October 1865. The original Carlsruhe post office closed in 1957. In July 1958, the name of the Railway Station post office was changed to Carlsruhe. It closed in March 1965.

== Gallery ==
Plaque on a cairn in the centre of Carlsruhe	Map on display in Carlsruhe

== See also ==
- Carlsruhe railway station
