= Alana Wilkinson =

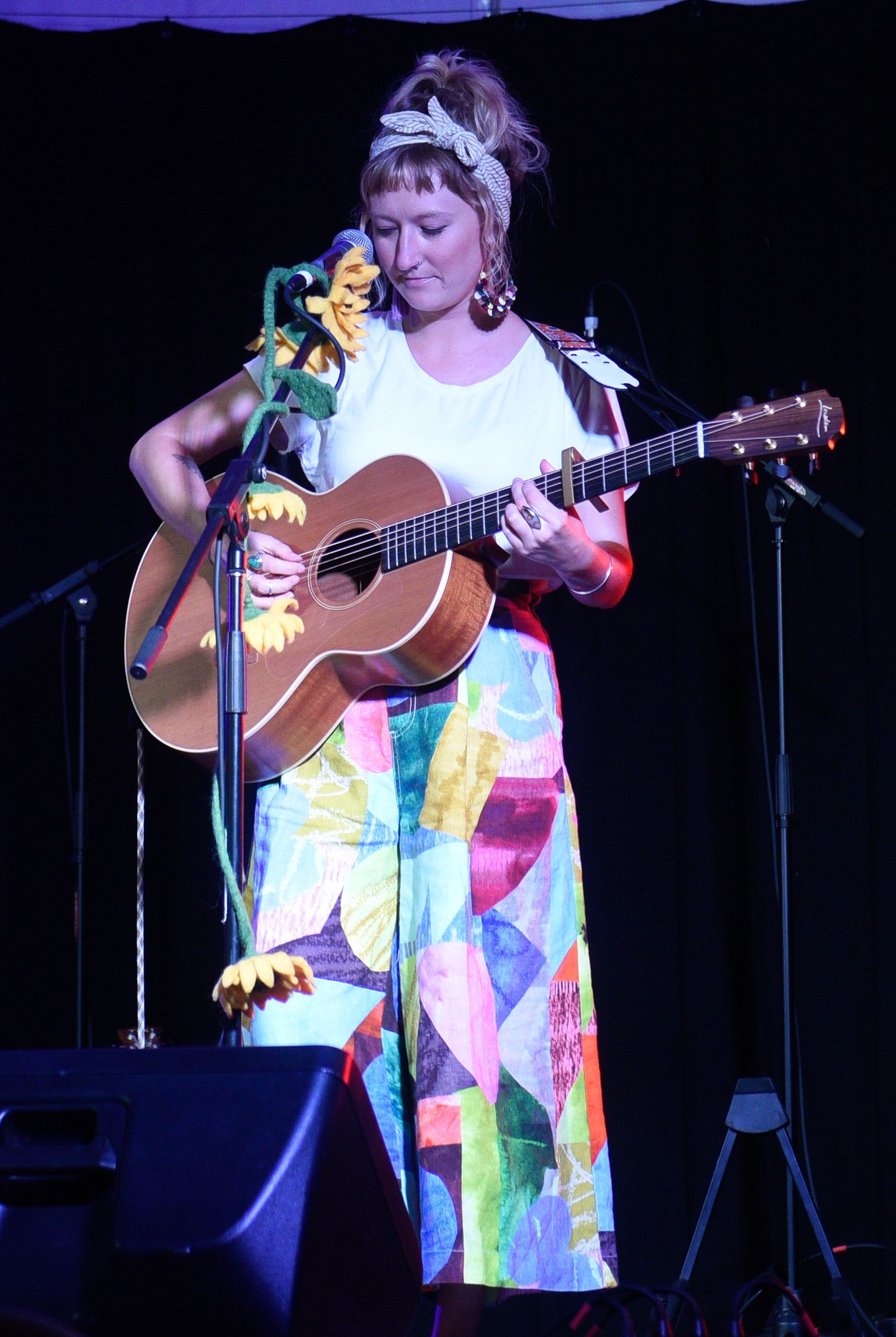

Background information
- Born: Alana Joy Wilkinson; 1991 (age 34–35)
- Origin: Melbourne, Victoria, Australia
- Genre: Folk
- Occupation: Musician
- Instruments: Vocals; acoustic guitar; piano; ukulele
- Years active: 2016–present
- Label: Independent

Alana Joy Wilkinson (born 1991) is an Australian folk music singer-songwriter and multi-instrumentalist. She released her first single in late 2018. She has released two extended plays and four singles. Wilkinson has supported national tours by fellow Australian artists Tim Freedman, Clare Bowditch and Kate Ceberano.

== Biography ==
=== Early life ===
Wilkinson was born in 1991 in Malvern, Victoria, to Jenny (a singer) and Stewart Wilkinson (a keyboardist) and grew up in "the most musical family" in Seaford. In September 2008, as a secondary student of Sandringham College, she took part in a musical play, Return to the Forbidden Planet. She was providing solo and group singing lessons and song writing workshops by April 2014. The singer described the live performances that inspired her to start her music career include Kimbra's "Settle Down", Sia's "Soon We'll Be Found" and Queen's "Somebody to Love".

=== Music career ===
Wilkinson uploaded a track, "Show You Mine", to her YouTube channel in December 2016. She was the support act for a five-piece folk band, Davies West, in early January 2017. The artist supported Eddi Reader (of Fairground Attraction) at her shows in Melbourne and Sydney in March. She sold a four-track extended play at her shows in the following month. She described the EP as "a little collection of oldies... They're really simple." She has performed at festivals in Blue Mountains, Queenscliff, Woodford, and Nannup. While singing she accompanies herself with acoustic guitar (made by George Lowden), piano or ukulele.

Her debut single, "Closer", appeared in late 2018, which was produced by Hayden Calnin. It was added to play lists at Triple J and on ABC Radio. The Partae's writer observed, "A fragile yet fulsome narrative matches the poppier side to an folk groove." She followed with a second single, "Partner in Crime", in April 2019. Pilerats' Craig Corrigan felt it was "bittersweet" detailing "a one-sided conversation she is having with her childhood best friend who unfortunately passed away." It was recorded with Calnin producing at an old church in the small community of Lauriston. For the session Wilkinson was joined by Justin Lewis on electric guitar, Angus Robb on whistles and background vocals and Xander Theofanis on bass guitar.

The musician took part in the Festival of Small Halls including an appearance at the Port Fairy Folk Festival in late 2019 alongside Scottish folk group, Paul McKenna Band. Wilkinson launched her third single, "Good for You", in February 2020, at a Fitzroy apartment building. A staff writer for write, sing, repeat found the set list was, "a delicate balance of honesty, story-telling, and hard life lessons learned – paired with comedy, wit, and just plain having a boogie." She issued her fourth single, "Rib Cage", in May 2020 ahead of her proposed album, Half Time Oranges. The track was produced by Calnin, again. She has supported national tours by fellow Australian artists Tim Freedman, Clare Bowditch, and Kate Ceberano.

In November 2023 Wilkinson won the Roddy Read Songwriting Award at the Maldon Folk Festival taking home a Maton guitar as the prize.

== Discography ==
=== Extended plays ===
- I Wanna Punch on with You (25 January 2017) Independent

=== Singles ===
Year	Title	Album
2018	"Closer": Released: November 2018; Format: Digital download	Self-titled EP
2019	"Partner in Crime": Released: May 2019; Format: Digital download	Self-titled EP
2020	"Good for You": Released: January 2020; Format: Digital download	Self-titled EP
2020	"Rib Cage": Released: June 2020; Format: Digital download	Half Time Oranges
