= Ashbourne, Victoria =

Ashbourne
- Town
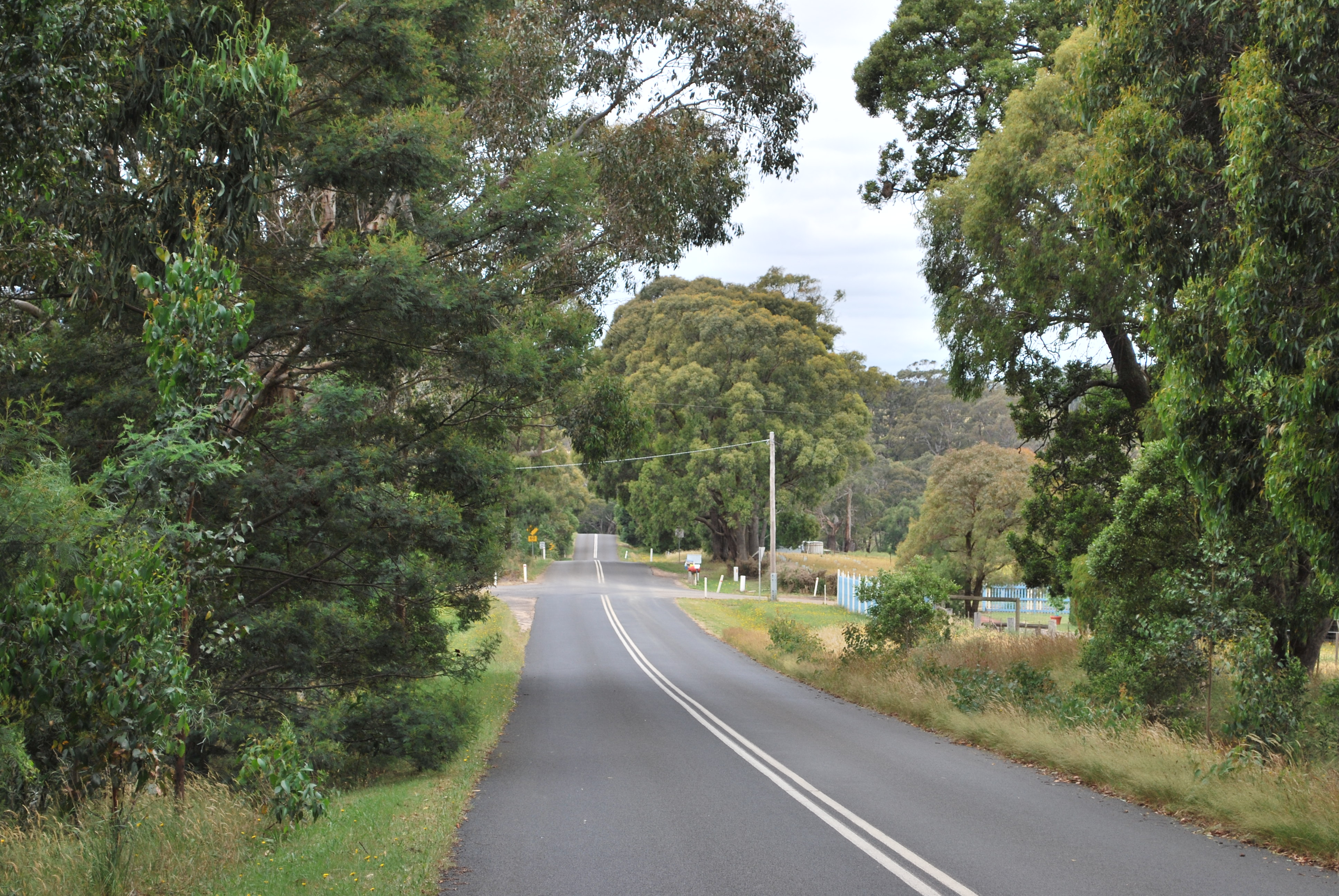
- Looking at Ashbourne from the west. The Campaspe River is in the background.

- Coordinates: 37°23′13″S 144°26′46″E
- Country: Australia
- State: Victoria
- LGA: Shire of Macedon Ranges
- Location: 72 km (45 mi) NW of Melbourne; 8 km (5.0 mi) SW of Woodend; 15 km (9.3 mi) E of Trentham

Government
  - State electorate: Macedon
  - Federal division: Bendigo, McEwen
- Elevation: 630 m (2,070 ft)

Population
  - Total: 242 (2021 census)
- Postcode: 3442

Ashbourne is a locality in Victoria, Australia. It is located on Falloons Road in the Shire of Macedon Ranges, to the west of Woodend. At the 2021 census, Ashbourne and the surrounding area had a population of 242.

Ashbourne Post Office opened on 16 December 1899 (known as Campaspe until 1900).
