= Greenhill Windmill =

Windmill in Victoria, Australia

- Interactive map of Greenhill Windmill

Origin
- Mill name: Greenhill Windmill / Windmill Farm windmill
- Mill location: Greenhill, Victoria
- Coordinates: 37.199688°S 144.435487°E
- Year built: 1856

Information
- Purpose: Corn mill
- Type: Tower mill
- Storeys: Four storey tower
- No. of sails: Four sails

Greenhill Windmill is a traditional masonry tower windmill, built in 1856 at Greenhill Farm near Kyneton, Victoria, Australia.

Joseph Hall (1804-21 August 1871) and William Hoad purchased thirty hectares of farm land located on Metcalfe Road, Green Hill, at the original Crown sales in 1855. The following year they erected the windmill, using bluestone quarried on their property.

Joseph Hall was born at Dacre, Kirkoswald, Cumberland, England, and married Annie Walton on 23 July 1831 at Kirkoswald. He became a local Kyneton pioneer who resided for a time at Sunbury Lodge prior to moving to Windmill Farm and then lived Park Hall, Lauriston where he died on 21 August 1871.

The property was bequeathed to the National Trust of Australia (Victoria) in 1984. is listed on the Victorian Heritage Register (H0311) and Shire of Metcalf Heritage Overlay (HO127) and is classified by the National Trust.

The mill is located at 1203 Kyneton-Metcalfe Road, Kyneton, Victoria 3444

- External photo
