= Sandringham College =

Location
- Sandringham, Victoria; Australia; 37°57′24″S 145°1′28″E

Information
- Type: Public
- Established: 1988
- Principal: Amy Porter
- Enrolment: ~1000
- Campus: Sandringham College 7–8 Campus; Sandringham College 9–12 Campus
- Website: www.sandringhamsc.vic.edu.au

Sandringham College, established in 1988, is a two-campus secondary college located in the south-eastern Melbourne suburb of Sandringham.

In 1987 the State Government of Victoria decided to merge four schools: Beaumaris High School, Hampton High School, Highett High School, and Sandringham Technical School. It was at the time when the Victorian Certificate of Education (VCE) was first introduced as the main certificate for the later years of schooling. The Sandringham Technical School site became the senior campus of Sandringham College; Hampton High, Beaumaris High and Highett High became Years 7–10 junior campuses.

== Campuses ==
Sandringham College comprises the following two campuses:

- Year 9–12 Campus (formerly Sandringham Campus and Sandringham Technical School), located at 11 Holloway Rd, Sandringham. It has a student population of approximately 760.
- Year 7–8 Campus (formerly Highett Campus and Highett High School), at 356 Bluff Rd, Sandringham. It has a student population of approximately 435.

The former Hampton Campus was closed in December 1988. The former Beaumaris Campus closed in December 2015, and Beaumaris Secondary College, a stand-alone school, was opened on that site in 2018.

The Year 7–8 Campus caters to students in Years 7–8, whilst the Year 9–12 campus is designed for the education of students studying for Years 9 – VCE, VCAL, or undertaking Vocational Education and Training (VET) studies. The school has an international program, with sister schools in Britain and Asia.

== Controversies ==
When the school introduced uniforms in 2014, it provoked uproar from students who objected to uniforms as being against the culture of the school. When the school introduced blazers to the uniform in 2019 in an effort to improve the image of the school, the junior campus faculty threatened to expel any student who complained about them, the item became more unpopular after the school announced that the blazer would continue to be worn in the summer months, and consequently the faculty were booed in the school assembly. The school countered by declaring that the blazers improved confidence and boosted academic results.

== Architecture and history ==
Both campuses of Sandringham College were designed by the Public Works Department of Victoria and built in the Light Timber Construction style.

- Highett High School was constructed in 1955 with Stage 2 extensions made in 1957 and 1960.
- Sandringham Technical School had two LTC wings constructed in 1955.

Both campuses are clad in grey cement tiles and, with minor alterations. As of recent, the Arts/Performance Buildings in the top-left of the school, have been demolished. The current academic focus undertaken by Sandringham College was compared by BetterEducation.com to that of McKinnon Secondary College and Melbourne High School.

== Notable alumni ==
- David Barlow
- Harrison Craig
- Jessica Jacobs
- Jeffrey Walker
- Alana Wilkinson (fl. 2008)
- Lorraine Wreford
- Sam Williamson
