= Lauriston Dam =

Dam in Victoria, Australia

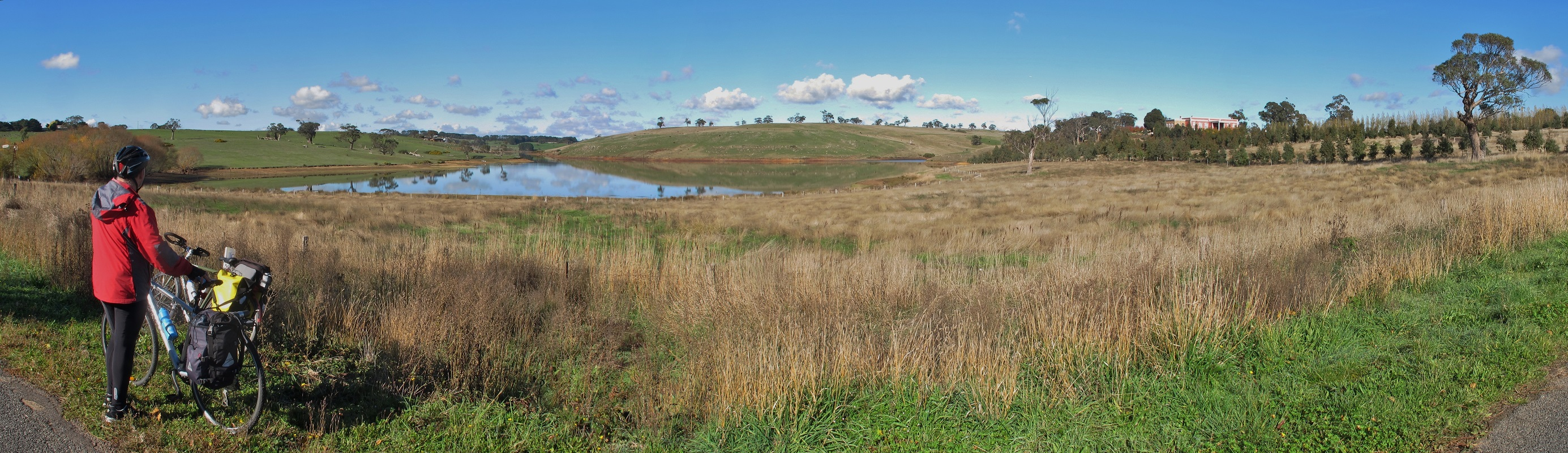
- The reservoir in 2014

- Location of the dam in Victoria
- Interactive map of Lauriston Dam
- Country: Australia
- Location: Kyneton, Central Victoria
- Coordinates: 37°15′12″S 144°22′48″E
- Purpose: Water supply
- Status: Operational
- Construction began: 1938
- Opening date: 1941
- Owner: Coliban Water

Dam and spillways
- Type of dam: Buttress dam; Rock-filled dam
- Impounds: Coliban River
- Height (foundation): 33 m (108 ft)
- Length: 244 m (801 ft)
- Dam volume: 42×10^{3} m^{3} (1.5×10^{6} cu ft)
- Spillways: 1
- Spillway type: Controlled
- Spillway length: 77 m (253 ft)
- Spillway capacity: 1,295 m^{3}/s (45,700 cu ft/s)

Reservoir
- Creates: Lauriston Reservoir
- Total capacity: 20 GL (16,000 acre⋅ft)
- Catchment area: 190 km^{2} (73 sq mi)
- Surface area: 208 ha (510 acres)
- Maximum length: 5.8 km (3.6 mi)
- Maximum width: 0.6 km (0.37 mi)
- Website coliban.com.au

The Lauriston Dam is a concrete buttress dam with rock-filled embankment across the Coliban River, 9 kilometres (5.6 mi) west of Kyneton, in Central Victoria, Australia. Completed in 1941, the resultant reservoir, Lauriston Reservoir, was created for the purpose of the supply of potable water.

The dam and reservoir are owned by Coliban Water.

== Dam and reservoir overview ==
=== Dam ===
Constructed between 1938 and 1941, the concrete-faced rock-fill dam wall is 33 metres (108 ft) high and 244 metres (801 ft) long. When full, the resultant reservoir has a storage capacity of 20 gigalitres (16,000 acre⋅ft) and covers 208 hectares (510 acres), drawn from a catchment area of 190 square kilometres (73 sq mi). The 77-metre-long (253 ft) controlled spillway has a discharge capacity of 1,295 cubic metres per second (45,700 cu ft/s). In 1949, the dam wall was raised and the secondary embankment was completed that is 7 metres (23 ft) high and 197 metres (646 ft) long, and includes both rock and earth-fill abutment sections.

=== Reservoir ===
The reservoir is a popular picnic ground for fishing and is stocked with redfin perch, rainbow and brown trout, roach and cod. A picnic and BBQ area is located near the dam wall at the end of Lauriston Reservoir Road.
