= Greenhill, Victoria =

Greenhill Victoria
- Coordinates: 37°10′17″S 144°25′49″E
- Population: 60 (2021 census)
- Postcode(s): 3444
- LGA(s): Shire of Macedon Ranges; Shire of Mount Alexander
- State electorate(s): Macedon
- Federal division(s): Bendigo

Greenhill is a locality in the Shire of Macedon Ranges and the Shire of Mount Alexander, Victoria, Australia. At the 2021 census, Greenhill had a population of 60.

Greenhill Windmill is located in Greenhill.
