= Coliban River =

River in Victoria, Australia

Coliban
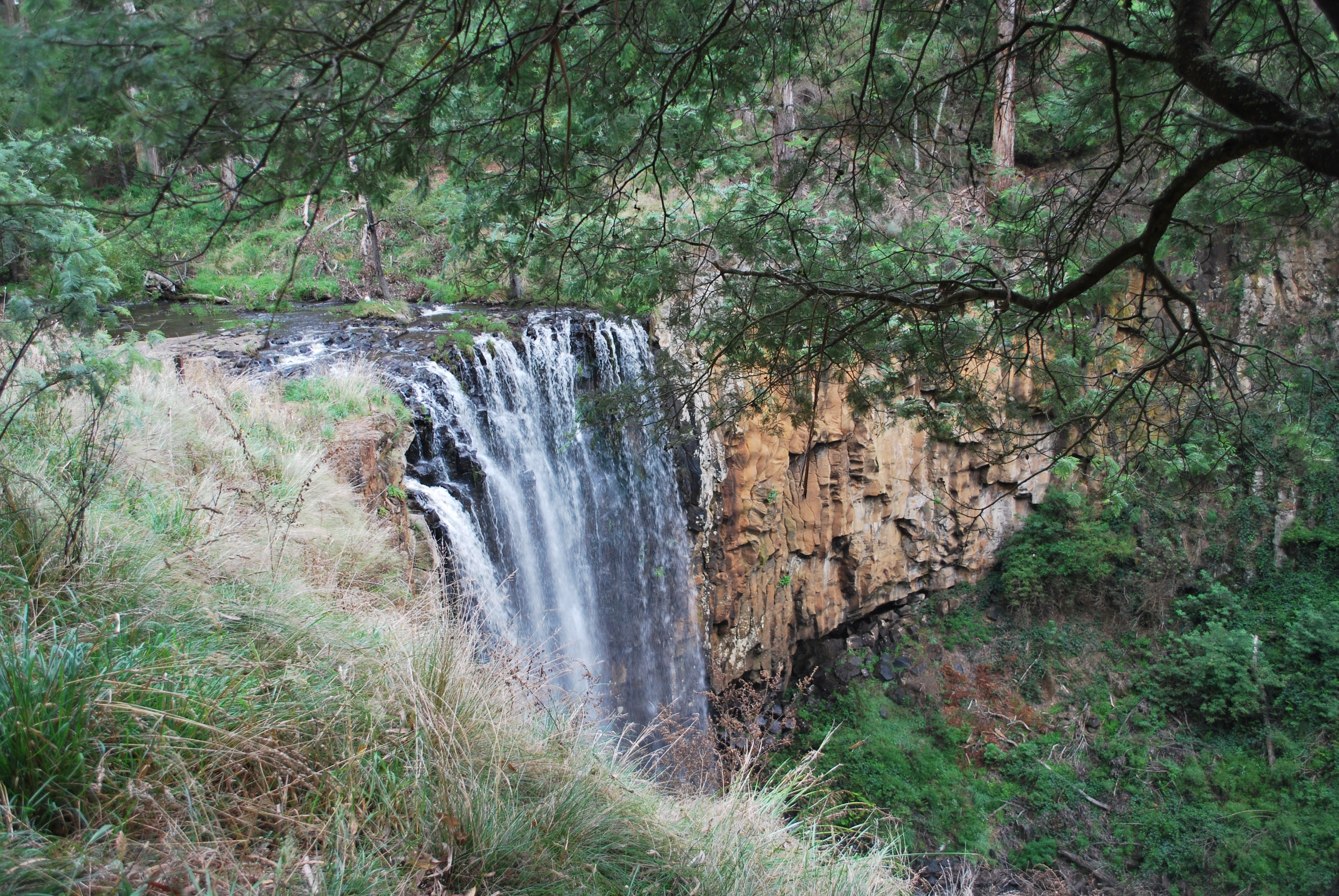
- Trentham Falls, in the upper reaches of the Coliban River

- Location of the Coliban River mouth in Victoria
- Native name: Teeranyap, Pe-er, Dindelong yaluk (Djadjawurrung); Pe-er, Dindelong yaluk (Daungwurrung)

Location
- Country: Australia
- State: Victoria
- Region: Riverina bioregion (IBRA), Central Highlands
- Local government areas: Moorabool, Hepburn, Mount Alexander, City of Greater Bendigo
- Towns: Trentham, Malmsbury, Metcalfe, Redesdale, Mintaro

Physical characteristics
- Source: Great Dividing Range
  - location: below Little Hampton
  - coordinates: 37°25′13″S 144°28′38″E
  - elevation: 701 m (2,300 ft)
- Mouth: confluence with the Campaspe River
  - location: Lake Eppalock
  - coordinates: 36°55′39.5″S 144°32′49.8″E
  - elevation: 183 m (600 ft)
- Length: 89 km (55 mi)
- Discharge
  - location: Echuca

Basin features
- River system: Victorian north–central catchment, Murray-Darling basin
- Tributaries
  - left: Kangaroo Creek, Myrtle Creek
  - right: Little Coliban River
- Waterfalls: Trentham Falls

The Coliban River, an inland perennial river of the north–central catchment, part of the Murray-Darling basin, is located in the lower Riverina bioregion and Central Highlands region of the Australian state of Victoria. The headwaters of the Coliban River rise on the northern slopes of the Great Dividing Range and descend to flow north into the Campaspe River with the impounded Lake Eppalock.

The river is a major water supply source for towns and cities in the lower Central Highlands region.

== Location and features ==
The river rises below Little Hampton near Lyonville in the Great Dividing Range and flows generally north, descending 33 metres (108 ft) over the Trentham Falls, and continuing to flow northward to the Upper Coliban, Lauriston and Malmsbury reservoirs. Subsequently, it flows through Malmsbury, Metcalfe, Redesdale and Mintaro, and finally reaches its confluence with the Campaspe River within Lake Eppalock. The river descends 518 metres (1,699 ft) over its 89-kilometre (55 mi) course.

Gold was found in the river in 1858, and water from the river was used to supply the goldfields cities of Bendigo and Castlemaine. As the population of those cities grew a water supply system consisting of 70 kilometres (43 mi) of tunnels and aqueducts was constructed. Over time, the water supply was extended to Kyneton, as well as many other smaller towns in the region. Today, the system supplies drinking water to a population exceeding 200,000. Coliban Water manages the three major water supply reservoirs, which are part of the Eppalock Proclaimed Water Supply Catchment.

== Fauna and flora ==
The river is home to the platypus as well as eight native fish species, including the Macquarie perch. Four of the fish species are endangered and the trout cod is regarded as critically endangered in the river, and may no longer be present. Indigenous vegetation in the area includes the black gum (Eucalyptus aggregata) which, though once plentiful in the area, is now rare due to vegetation clearance over many years.

== Etymology ==
In the Aboriginal Djadjawurrung language, the name for the river is Teeranyap, with no clearly defined meaning. In the Taungurung and Djadjawurrung languages, the names for the river is Pe-er, with no clearly defined meaning, and Dindelong yaluk, with yaluk meaning "river".

== See also ==
- List of rivers of Australia § Victoria
- Garfield water wheel
