= Newham, Victoria =

Newham
- Town
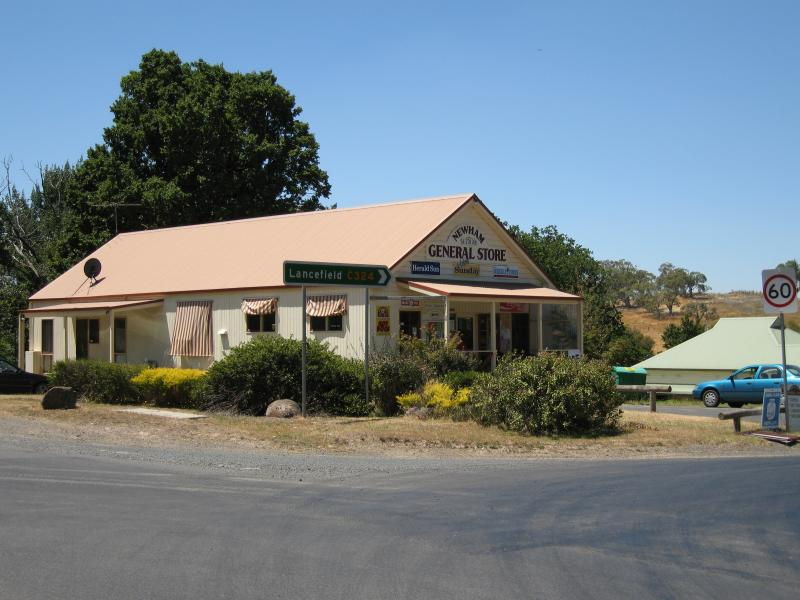
- Newham General Store, 2006

- Interactive map of Newham
- Coordinates: 37°19′S 144°36′E
- Country: Australia
- State: Victoria
- LGA: Shire of Macedon Ranges
- Location: 76 km (47 mi) NW of Melbourne; 18 km (11 mi) SE of Kyneton; 15 km (9.3 mi) W of Lancefield; 9 km (5.6 mi) E of Woodend

Government
  - State electorate: Macedon
  - Federal division: McEwen
- Elevation: 580 m (1,900 ft)

Population
  - Total: 506 (2016 census)
- Postcode: 3442
Localities around Newham
Carlsruhe	Cobaw	Benloch
Woodend North	Newham	Rochford
Woodend	Hesket	Kerrie and Romsey

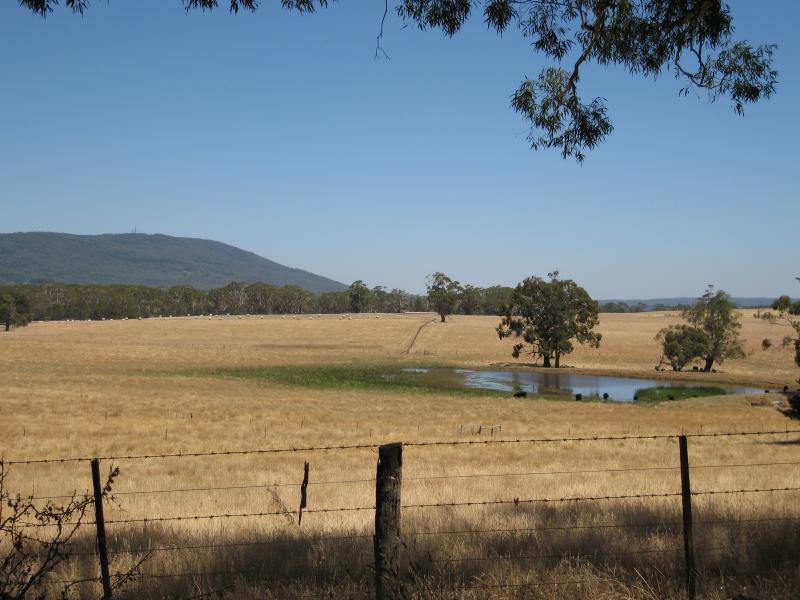
Farmland viewed from Jim Road

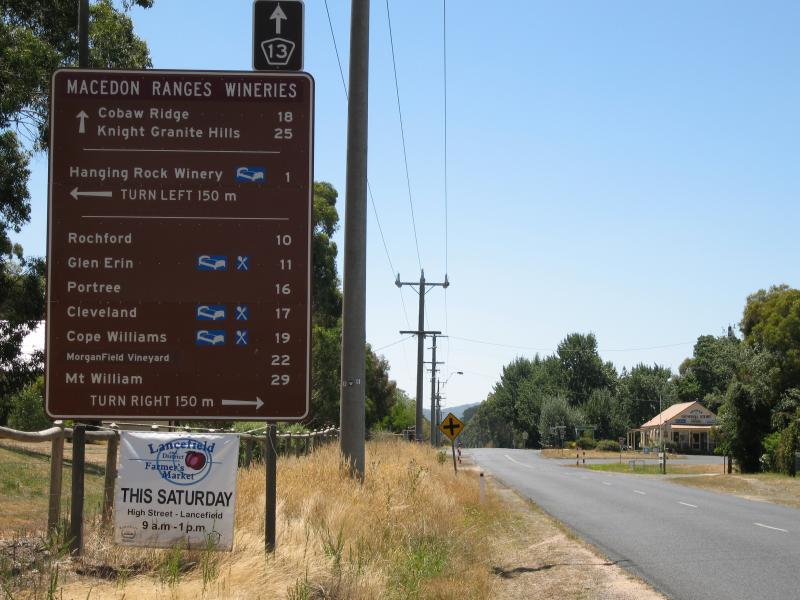
A sign on Coach Road

Newham (/ˈnjuːəm/) is a town in the Shire of Macedon Ranges in Victoria, Australia. It is situated between the towns of Kyneton, Woodend and Lancefield. At the 2006 census, the surrounding area had a population of 570. At the 2016 census, Newham and the surrounding area had a population of 506.

== History ==
The township of Newham was occupied as a station in 1847 by settlers named Peters and Dryden and called Dryden's Rock; The district of Newham and Woodend was created in December 1861; it became the Shire of Newham and Woodend in January 1905.

Newham Post Office opened on 16 September 1861 and closed in 1971.

=== Possible origins of the name ===
In 1848 it may have been named Newham after Rev. Newham, an Anglican priest. Around the 1850s, Newham was known variously as Hieland Town or Isle of Skye, perhaps indicating a Scottish heritage of the early settlers. It would appear that these names were colloquial terms rather than official names.

While it is likely that the town was named after Rev. Newham, other theories exist regarding the origins of the name Newham. Historians appear to be divided on the origins of Edward Dryden, one of the first settlers, who is thought by some to have been born in Newham, Northumberland, England. Alternatively, it has been supposed that Dryden came from Oldham, Greater Manchester, England, and that he named his new home in recognition of the new country.

== Today ==
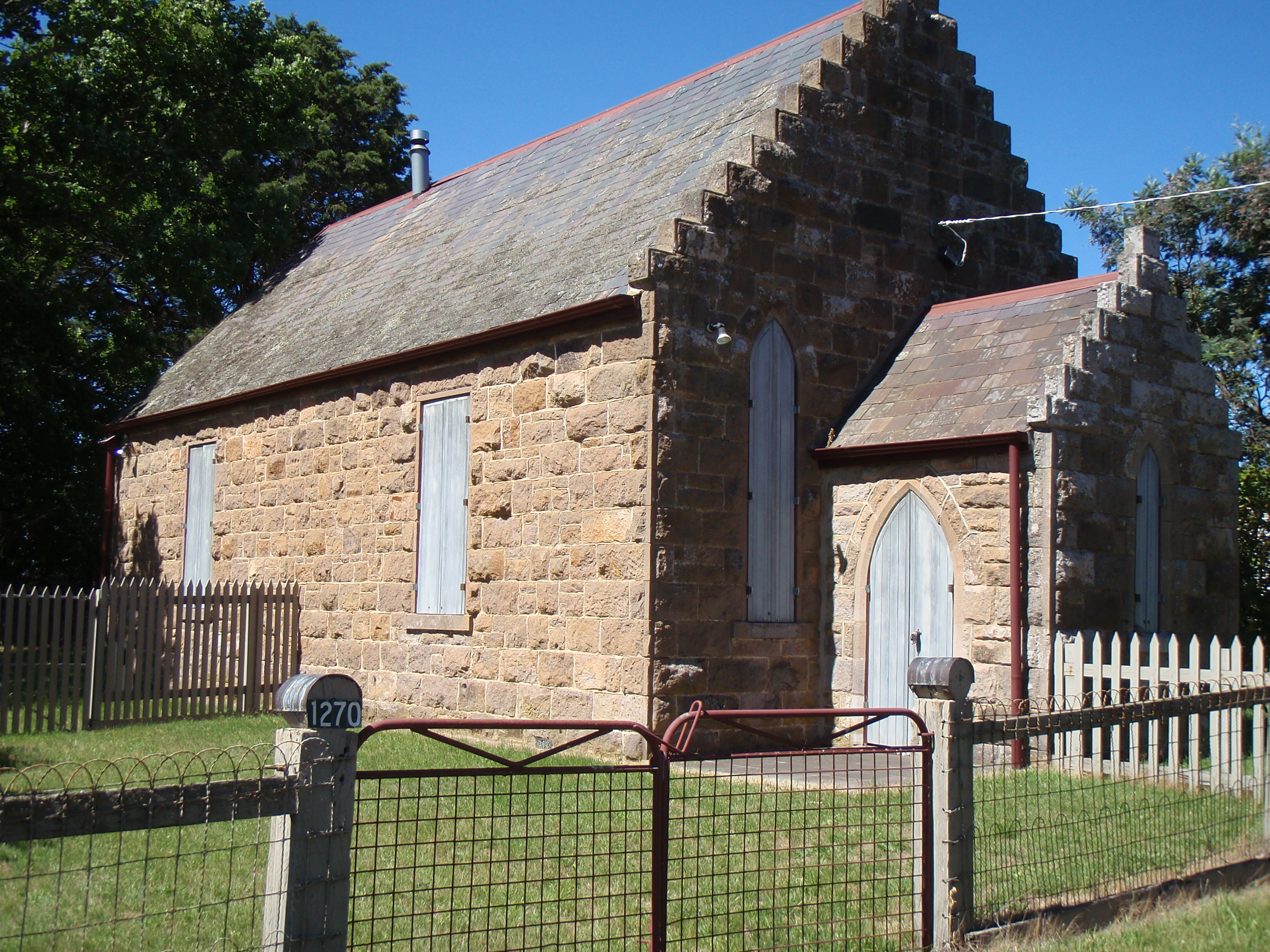
The old church, now privately owned

Newham is close to Hanging Rock and is home to the Hanging Rock Winery, which is located on Jim Road on the Jim Jim Hill. The area is currently served by the Newham General Store (which closed in September 2007 but reopened in June 2009), located on the intersection of Jim Road, Rochford Road, Coach Road and Dons Road opposite the fire station. It now operates as both a general store and cafe.

Newham has a primary school (State School 1913), a hall (1903) and a park. There is a small, unused bluestone church (1868) opposite the school. The Newham Fire Brigade station is on the corner of Dons Road and Rochford Road (opposite the General store).

On 4 December 2009, the modernisations to the 1905 Mechanics' Hall were officially opened. This hall is credited with being the birthplace of the Victorian Farmers Union, which later became the Country Party then National Party of Australia.
