= Cobaw =

- Town
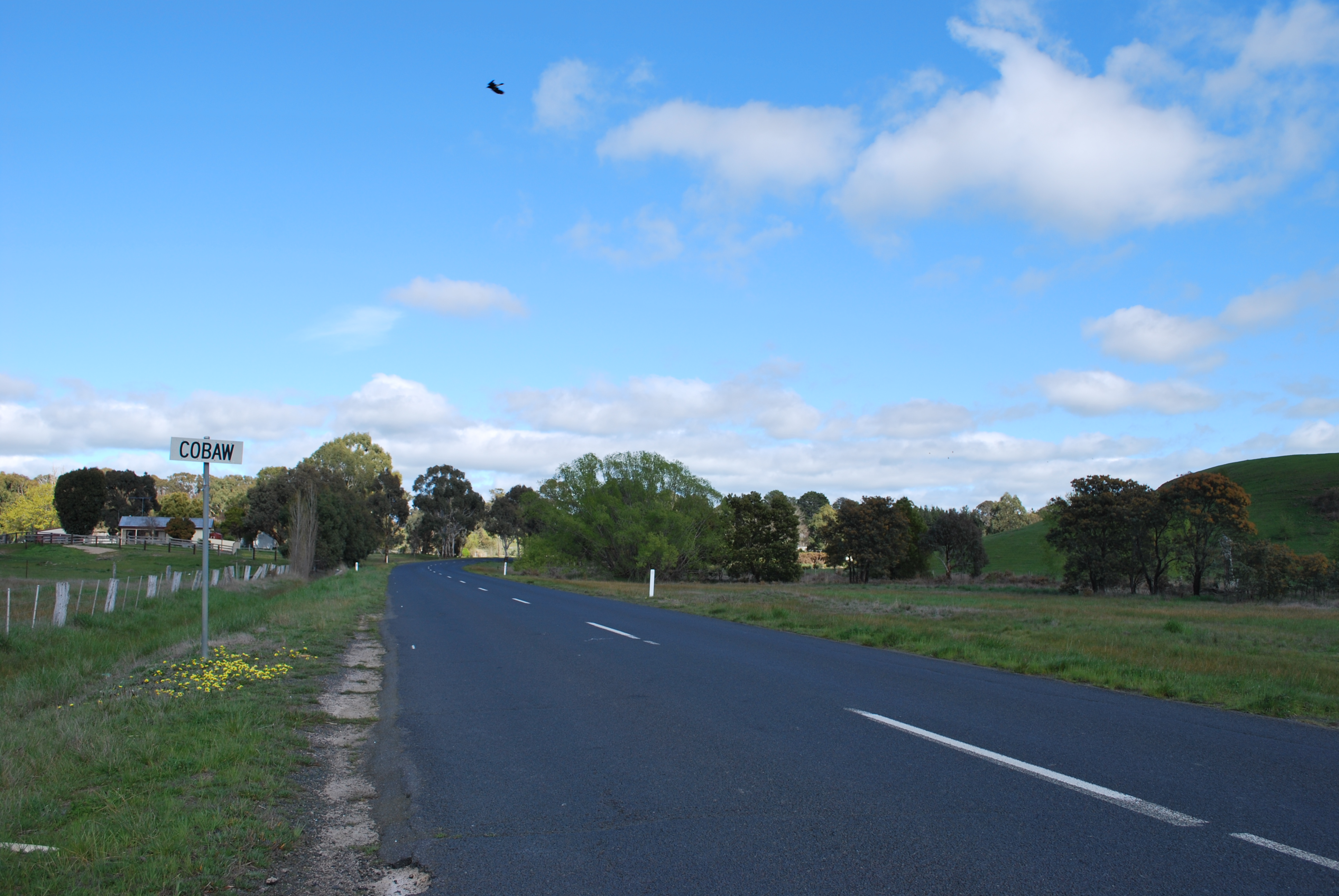
- Entering Cobaw

- Coordinates: 37°16′S 144°38′E
- Country: Australia
- State: Victoria
- LGA: Shire of Macedon Ranges

Government
  - State electorate: Macedon
  - Federal division: McEwen
- Elevation: 490 m (1,610 ft)

Population
  - Total: 70 (2,016)
- Postcode: 3442
Localities around Cobaw
Carlsruhe	Cobaw Range / State Forest.	Benloch
Carlsruhe	Cobaw	Lancefield
Newham	Newham	Rochford

Cobaw is a locality in the Macedon Ranges Shire, in Victoria, situated on Dry Creek. The Cobaw area formerly had its own Post Office and State school, now closed. Cobaw Post Office opened on 1 December 1887 and closed in 1952. The Cobaw Range is a section of the Great Dividing Range north of the settlement, running roughly east–west. The ranges are mainly granitic and reach a maximum height of 760m. Most of the western parts of this range are within the boundaries of the Cobaw State Forest. In the 2016 censes Cobaw had a population of 70.
