= Shire of Macedon Ranges =

Coordinates: 37°21′00″S 144°37′00″E

- Local government area
- Location in Victoria

- Interactive map of Shire of Macedon Ranges
- Country: Australia
- State: Victoria
- Region: Loddon Mallee
- Established: 1995
- Council seat: Kyneton

Government
  - State electorate: Macedon
  - Federal divisions: Bendigo; McEwen

Area
  - Total: 1,748 km^{2} (675 sq mi)

Population
  - Total: 51,458 (2021)
  - Density: 29.438/km^{2} (76.245/sq mi)
- Gazetted: 19 January 1995
- Website: Shire of Macedon Ranges
LGAs around Shire of Macedon Ranges
Mount Alexander	Mitchell	Mitchell
Hepburn	Shire of Macedon Ranges	Mitchell
Moorabool	Melton	Hume

The Shire of Macedon Ranges is a local government area in Central Victoria, Australia, best known for its native forests, geographical attraction Hanging Rock, and artisan food and wine industries. The region covers an area of 1,748 square kilometres (675 mi^{2}). It is located in between the cities of Bendigo and Melbourne. In August 2021 the shire had a population of 51,458. It includes the towns of Gisborne, Gisborne South, Kyneton, Lancefield, Macedon, Malmsbury, Mount Macedon, New Gisborne, Riddells Creek, Romsey and Woodend.

The Shire is named after the region's major geographical feature, the Macedon Ranges. It has become one of Victoria's most popular tourist attractions and contains some of its most sought-after real estate.

It is governed and administered by the Macedon Ranges Shire Council. It has offices located in Kyneton, Gisborne and Romsey.

Old logo used up to early 2013

Macedon Ranges was one of the highest-rated areas in Australia in the Quality of Life Index 2008. It was the highest rated in Victoria (outside Melbourne), and was 13th of 590 Australian local government areas.

== History ==
The Shire of Macedon Ranges was formed in 1995 from the amalgamation of the Shire of Romsey, Shire of Gisborne, Shire of Newham and Woodend, and most of the Shire of Kyneton (excluding the Trentham district, which was absorbed into the Hepburn Shire).

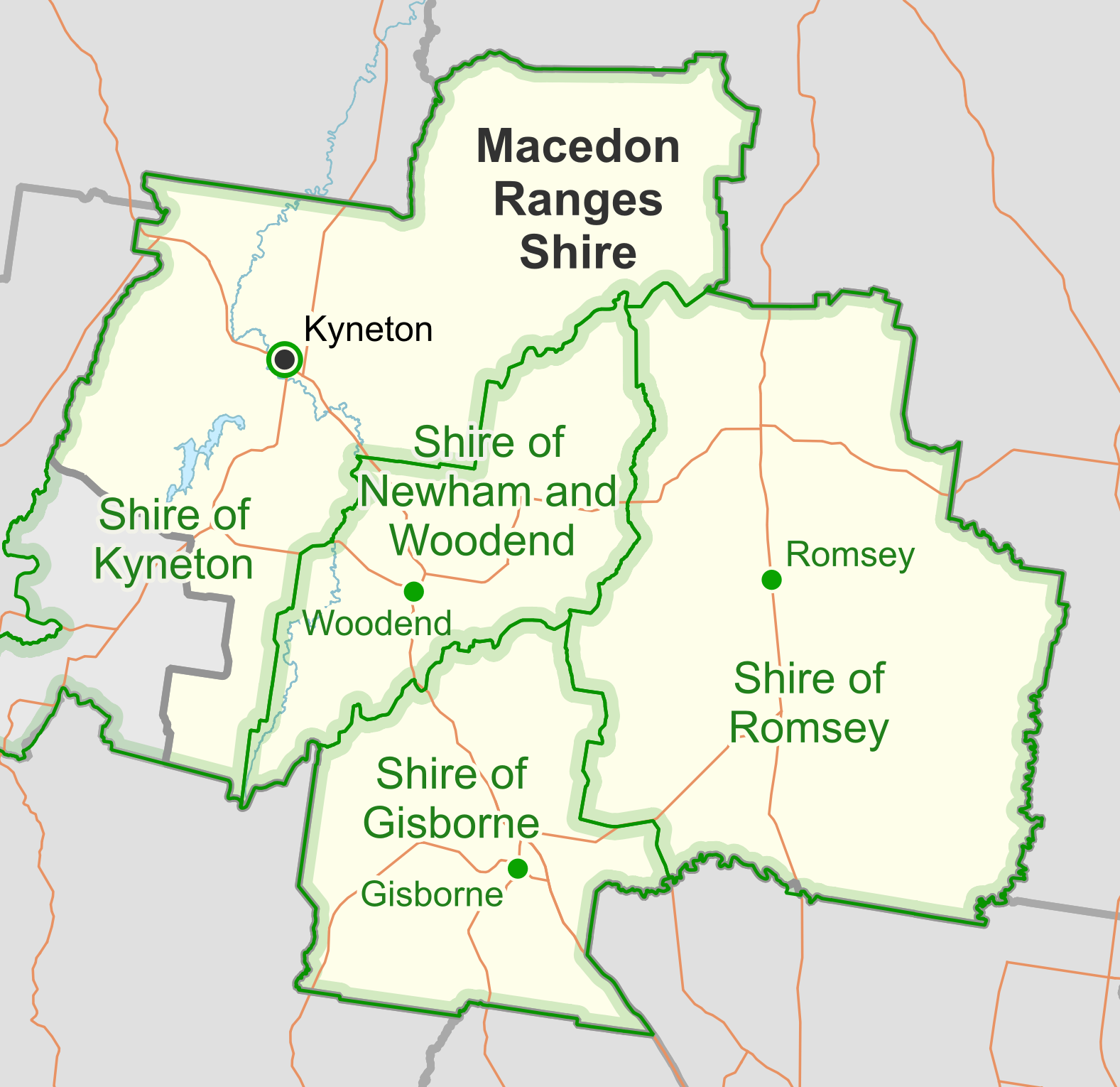
Macedon Ranges Shire's predecessor LGAs (green) as they were in 1994. The administrative centres of the former LGAs are marked by green dots.

== Council ==
=== Current composition ===
Ward boundaries in use since 2008. Expand the map and click on a ward to see the ward name.

The council is composed of three wards (East, South and West) and nine councillors, with three councillors per ward elected to represent each ward.

Since October 2024, Macedon Ranges has consisted of the following councillors:

Ward	Councillor	Notes
East Ward	Cassy Borthwick	Deputy Mayor
East Ward	Daniel Young	
East Ward	Andrew Scanlon	
South Ward	Dom Bonanno	
South Ward	Alison Joseph	
South Ward	Rob Guthrie	
West Ward	Jennifer Anderson	
West Ward	Kate Kendall	Mayor
West Ward	Janet Pearce	

=== Administration and governance ===
The Council meets in the Council chambers at Gisborne, which is also the location of one of the Council's administrative centres. It also provides customer services at both its administrative centre in Kyneton, and its service centres in Gisborne and Romsey.

The Woodend customer service centre, based at the community centre, closed on 1 January 2026.

== Education ==
Gisborne Secondary College, the largest secondary school in the shire, is located in Gisborne, and provides both academic and vocational programs for over 1000 students from across the Macedon Ranges.

Kyneton Secondary College is Kyneton's state secondary school, along with Sacred Heart College (Catholic), and Braemar College east of Woodend (Ecumenical, co-educational) as the largest non-government secondary schools in the shire.

Candlebark School (R-12, near Romsey) and Alice Miller School (7-12, near Macedon), both founded by Australian author and educator John Marsden, provide alternative education options.

There are several primary schools across the shire.

== Townships and localities ==
In the 2021 census, the shire had a population of 51,458 compared to 46,100 in the 2016 census.

Population
Locality	2016	2021
Ashbourne	196	242
Baynton	107	95
Baynton East	*	#
Benloch	135	138
Bolinda	197	185
Bullengarook	645	714
Bylands^	131	117
Cadello	13	25
Carlsruhe	327	382
Cherokee	56	68
Chintin	106	111
Clarkefield^	320	303
Cobaw	70	104
Darraweit Guim	402	402
Denver^	150	148
Drummond^	283	294
Edgecombe	94	103
Fern Hill^	104	125
Gisborne	8,999	10,142
Gisborne South	799	854
Goldie	227	253
Greenhill^	54	60
Hesket	168	178
Kerrie	81	83
Kyneton	6,951	7,513
Kyneton South	124	116
Lancefield	2,455	2,743
Lauriston	236	247
Macedon	2,040	2,073
Malmsbury^	831	905
Monegeetta	218	207
Mount Macedon	1,335	1,450
New Gisborne	2,387	2,509
Newham	506	533
Pastoria	48	75
Pastoria East	38	51
Pipers Creek	159	189
Riddells Creek	3,947	4,390
Rochford	71	71
Romsey	4,746	5,797
Sidonia	13	28
Spring Hill^	198	200
Springfield	3	9
Tantaraboo	*	#
Taradale^	448	524
Toolern Vale^	724	818
Trentham East^	153	181
Tylden^	535	645
Woodend	5,806	6,732
Woodend North	304	315

^ - Territory divided with another LGA
* - Not noted in 2016 Census
# - Not noted in 2021 Census

== See also ==
- List of places of worship in Macedon Ranges Shire
