= Coliban Water =

Regional water corporation in Victoria, Australia

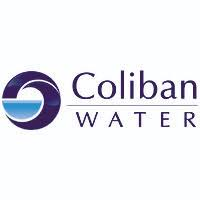

Statutory authority overview
- Formed: 1 July 1992
- Jurisdiction: Government of Victoria
- Headquarters: Bendigo, Victoria
- Motto: To provide water and sewage services for public health and the environment so our communities can sustain themselves.
- Employees: c. 300
- Minister responsible: Minister for Water (Victoria)
- Parent department: Department of Energy, Environment and Climate Action
- Website: www.coliban.com.au

Coliban Water is a regional water corporation in Victoria, Australia, established on 1 July 1992. It manages, maintains and operates more than 50 reservoirs and water storage basins across North-Central Victoria.

The service area includes 55 towns, of which the Greater City of Bendigo is the largest. The region serviced by Coliban Water extends from Cohuna and Echuca in the north to Kyneton and Trentham in the south. The western boundary incorporates Boort, Wedderburn, Bealiba and Dunolly, with Heathcote and Tooborac to the east.

Coliban Water's head office is located in Bendigo.

== History ==
Edward Nucella Emmett worked to establish a reliable water supply for Bendigo, he was the main promoter of Bendigo Waterworks Company, a precursor of Coliban Water. Given the financial problems of the Victorian colonial government and the lack of local government funds he worked to privately fund a new water supply. The Sandhurst Municipal Council controlled a 22-acre ‘Water Reserve’ site along the Bendigo Creek at Golden Square. With funding from wealthy investors in Melbourne he formed the company that was incorporated through parliament. Joseph Brady was the first engineer for the project.

== See also ==
- List of reservoirs and dams in Australia
