= Tylden, Victoria =

Tylden
- Town
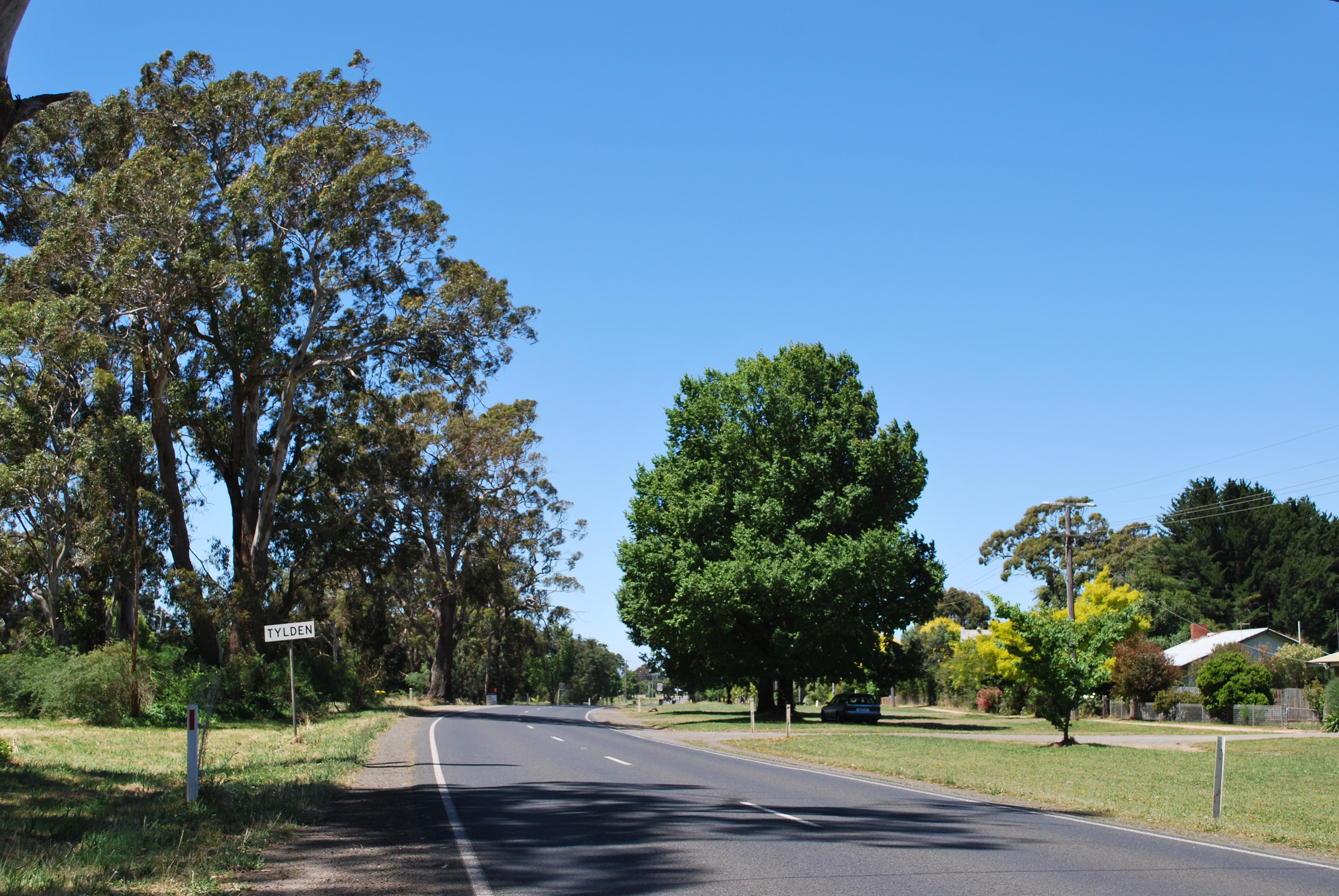
- Road entrance to Tylden, 2011

- Interactive map of Tylden
- Coordinates: 37°20′0″S 144°25′0″E
- Country: Australia
- State: Victoria
- LGA: Shire of Macedon Ranges
- Location: 83 km (52 mi) N of Melbourne; 74 km (46 mi) S of Bendigo; 77 km (48 mi) NE of Ballarat; 11 km (6.8 mi) S of Kyneton; 13 km (8.1 mi) W of Woodend

Government
  - State electorate: Macedon
  - Federal division: Bendigo, Ballarat
- Elevation: 588 m (1,929 ft)

Population
  - Total: 645 (2021 census)
- Postcode: 3444

Tylden is a town in central Victoria, Australia in the Shire of Macedon Ranges local government area, 83 kilometres (52 mi) north-west of the state capital, Melbourne. At the 2021 census, Tylden has a population of 645. Tylden is on Dja Dja Wurrung country.

== History ==
The Tylden post office was opened on 7 January 1860.

In March 1880, Tylden railway station was opened when the branch line to Daylesford was completed as far as Trentham. In February 1928, the station became unstaffed and was supervised from Carlsruhe station. Tylden station was closed in July 1978, along with the whole Daylesford line.

The notable RAAF commander, Joe Hewitt, was born in Tylden.

== Today ==
Tylden is home to the large Woodside Park Stud and thoroughbred racehorse pre-training facility, established at a cost of A$20m. The creation of the training facility was strongly opposed by residents. In recent years it has been taken over by Mark Rowsthorn and is focusing on the breeding of thoroughbreds rather than a racing stable. Wadham Park is now known as Woodside Park Stud.

== See also ==
Former Tylden railway station
