= Hanging Rock, Victoria =

Rock formation in Victoria, Australia

Hanging Rock (Ngannelong)
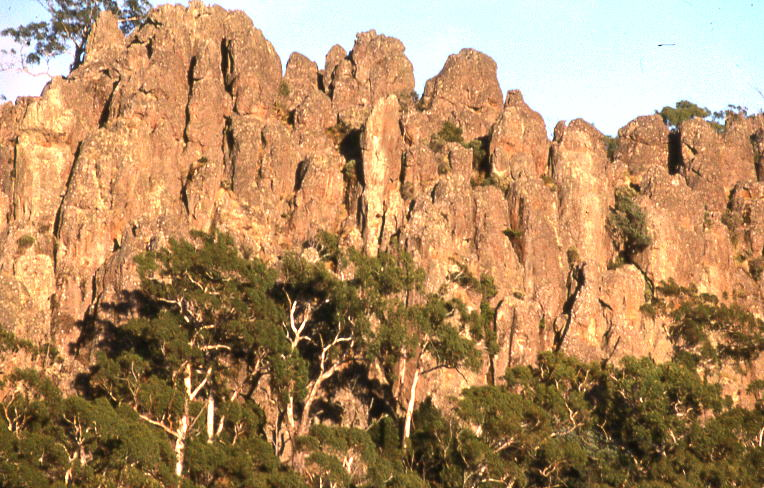

Highest point
- Elevation: 718 m (2,356 ft)AHD
- Prominence: 105 metres (344 ft) above plain
- Coordinates: 37°19′49″S 144°35′42″E

Geography
- Location within Victoria
- Location: Victoria, Australia
- Parent range: Macedon

Geology
- Rock age: 6.25 million years
- Mountain type: Mamelon

Hanging Rock (also known as Dryden's Mount or Dryden's Rock, and to some Aboriginal Australians as Ngannelong) is a distinctive geological formation in central Victoria, Australia. A former volcano, it lies 718 m above sea level, and 105 m above the surrounding plain, between the two small townships of Newham and Hesket, approximately 70 km north-west of Melbourne, and a few kilometres north of Mount Macedon.

In the middle of the 19th century, the original occupants of the place—the Dja Dja Wurrung, Woi Wurrung and Taungurung people—were forced from it. They had been its occupants for thousands of years and, colonisation notwithstanding, continue to maintain cultural and spiritual connections to it.

In the late 20th century, the area became widely known as the setting of Joan Lindsay's novel Picnic at Hanging Rock.

== Toponyms ==
Attempts to uncover Hanging Rock's Aboriginal name have proven difficult. Some think it is "Anneyelong" because of an inscription underneath an engraving of the rock made by German naturalist William Blandowski after an expedition in 1855–56. Historian and toponymist Ian D. Clark believes Blandowski misheard the name, and the word was possibly "Ngannelong" or something similar.

The name "Diogenes Mount" was bestowed on the rock by the surveyor Robert Hoddle in 1843, in keeping with the spirit of several ancient Macedonian names given to places by explorer Thomas Mitchell during his 1836 expedition through western Victoria, which passed close to Hanging Rock. Other names include Mount Macedon, Mount Alexander, and the Campaspe River. Six other European names (Mount Diogenes, Diogenes' Head, Diogenes Monument, Dryden's Rock, Dryden's Monument and Hanging Rock) have also been recorded.

== Geology ==
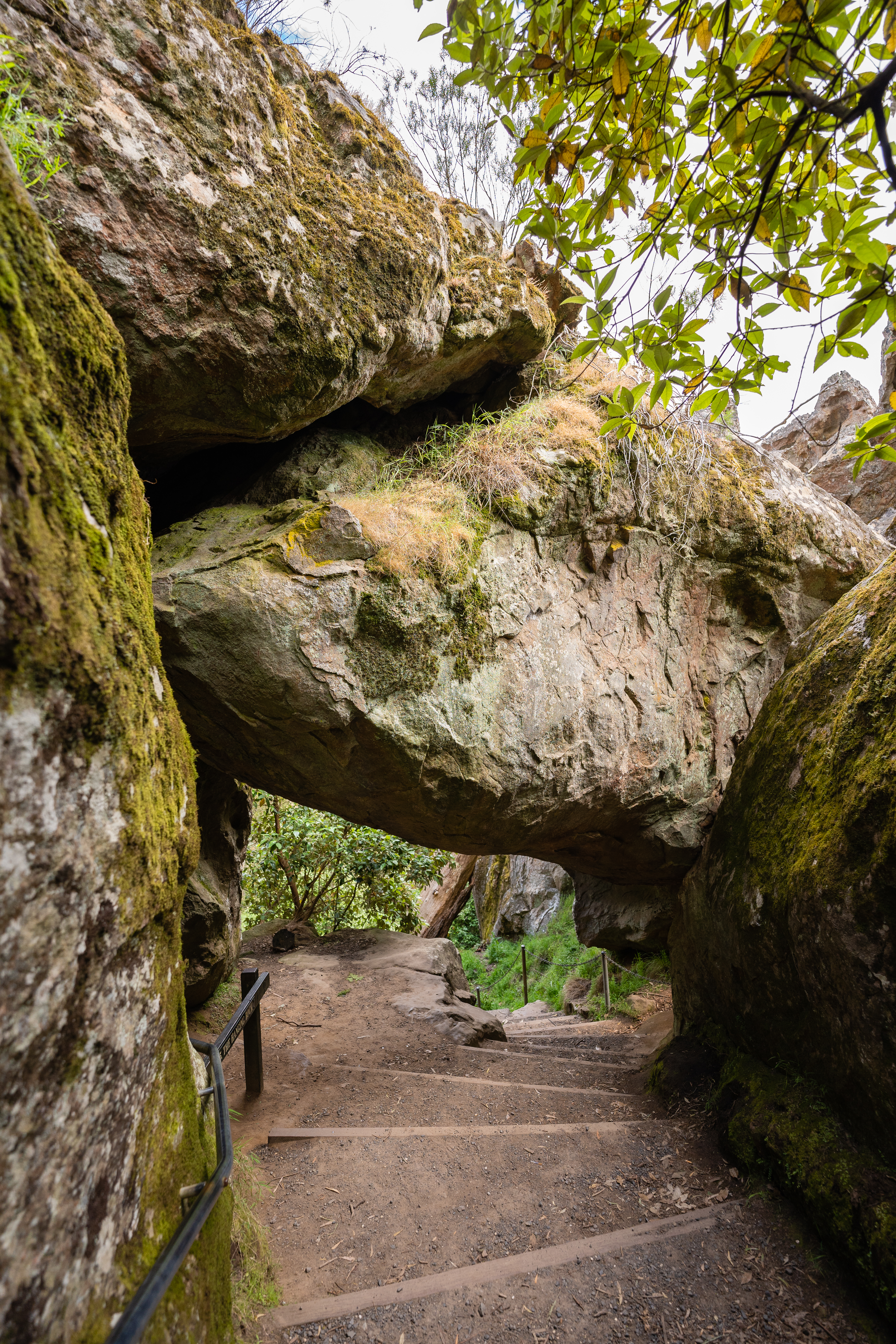
The 'Hanging Rock' over the path to the summit that gives the site as a whole its name, 2019

Hanging Rock is a mamelon, created 6.25 million years ago by stiff lava oozing from a vent and congealing in place. It is not a volcanic plug. There are two other mamelons nearby, created during the same period: Camels Hump, to the south on Mount Macedon and, to the east, Crozier's Rocks. Alternative names for Crozier's Rocks are Brock's Monument, Alexander's Head and Mount Crystal. All three mamelons are composed of soda trachyte. As the magma at Hanging Rock cooled and contracted, it split into rough columns. Over time, the columns weathered into the many pinnacles that can be seen today.

The three mamelons demonstrate the mechanism of plate tectonics. As the Australian Plate moved northwards towards East Asia over 27 million years, it passed over a volcanic hotspot. That resulted in the formation of a chain of volcanoes stretching from Hillsborough (33 million years ago) in Northern Queensland to Hanging Rock (6.5 million years ago), which is part of the southernmost end of that volcanic activity. This chain also includes the Warrumbungles (New South Wales, 15.5 million years ago) and the Glass House Mountains (Southern Queensland, 24.3 million years ago). Those volcanoes all have the same chemical composition.

Hanging Rock contains numerous distinctive rock formations, including the "Hanging Rock" itself, a boulder suspended between other boulders, under which is the main entrance path, the Colonnade, the Eagle and the UFO. Hanging Rock's highest point is 718 metres above sea level and 105 metres above the plain below.

== Community ==
Horse races have been held at Hanging Rock for over 100 years; the Hanging Rock Racing Club holds two race meetings a year, on New Year's Day and Australia Day (26 January).

The Friends of Hanging Rock, established in 1987, is a community group that holds events open to the public, such as planting days and wildlife tours.

In 2013, the Hanging Rock Action Group was formed by local residents to call for adequate community consultation about the Macedon Ranges Shire Council's proposal to build a 200-person conference centre and 100-bed hotel in the Eastern Paddock, adjacent to and very visible from the Rock. The local community's anger over this issue led to 7 of 9 councillors being voted out in the following elections.

Hanging Rock is the centrepiece for the Hanging Rock Recreation Reserve, a public reserve managed by the Macedon Ranges Shire Council. The reserve includes a horseracing track, picnic grounds, creek, interpretation centre and cafe. The reserve is a habitat for endemic flora and fauna, including koalas, wallabies, possums, phascogales, wedge-tailed eagles, and kookaburras.

There is also a "Picnic at Hanging Rock" costumed event held in February around Valentine's Day, organised by Central Highlands Victorian Historical Group. Participants dress in Victorian or Edwardian attire and picnic at the base before climbing the Rock for photo opportunities.

The reserve is open to the public during daylight hours seven days a week. Entry is charged per vehicle. Camping is possible by arrangement.

Hanging Rock Reserve is listed on the Victorian Heritage Register as a place of historical, aesthetic and social significance to the State of Victoria.

Hanging Rock Reserve is under review by the Department of Environment, Land, Water and Planning to determine future governance and administrative arrangements for management of the site.

== Treatments in novel and film ==
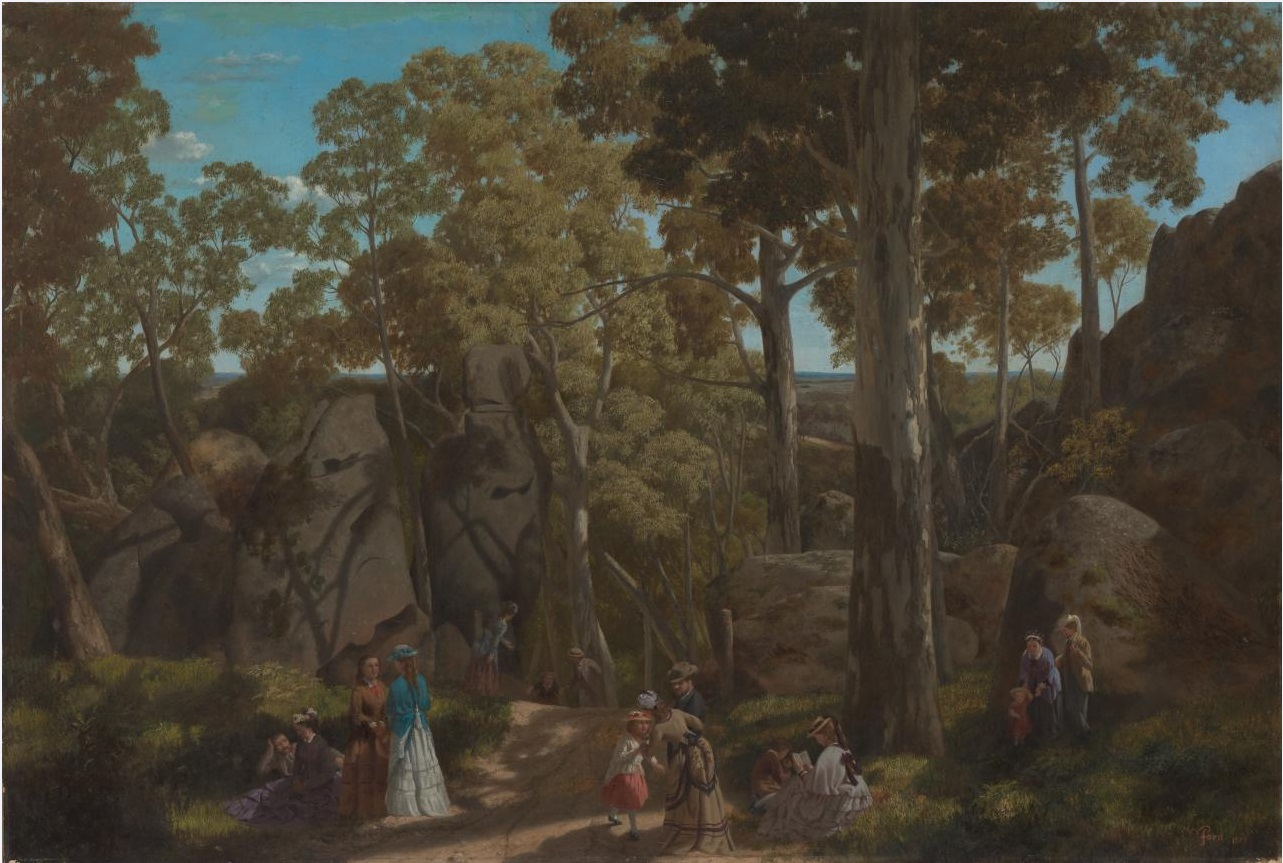
William Ford, At the Hanging Rock, 1875, National Gallery of Victoria

Hanging Rock was the inspiration and setting for the novel Picnic at Hanging Rock, written by Joan Lindsay and published in 1967. The novel dealt with the disappearance of a number of schoolgirls during a visit to the site.

The novel's popularity led to several adaptations in film, theatre, radio and television, with the 1975 film Picnic at Hanging Rock directed by Peter Weir the most prominent example. The film's success was responsible for a substantial increase in visits to the rock and a renewal of interest in the novel.

== Concert venue ==
Hanging Rock reserve is used as an occasional outdoor concert venue by major international acts on tours.

The following events have taken place at Hanging Rock as part of a trial by Frontier Touring and the Macedon Ranges Shire Council:

- Leonard Cohen – November 2010
- Rod Stewart – February 2012
- Bruce Springsteen – March 2013 (Wrecking Ball tour)

In 2014, the Rolling Stones were scheduled to play a night concert (30 March) at Hanging Rock as part of their "14 On Fire" tour. The death of Mick Jagger's partner, L'Wren Scott, resulted in the tour's postponement. The tour was rescheduled and resumed in Adelaide on October 25. The Hanging Rock concert was rescheduled for November 8, but Jagger cancelled the concert due to a throat infection.

In October 2013, Frontier Touring signed a five-year agreement with the Macedon Ranges Shire Council to hold up to four concerts per year at Hanging Rock, effective from 31 October 2014.

Subsequent concerts have been:

- The Eagles – February 2015 (History of the Eagles)
- Rod Stewart – March 2015
- Cold Chisel – November 2015
- Ed Sheeran – February 2017
- Bruce Springsteen – February 2017
- Midnight Oil – November 2017
- Elton John – January 2020 (Farewell Yellow Brick Road)
- Nick Cave and Warren Ellis – November 2022

== Gallery ==
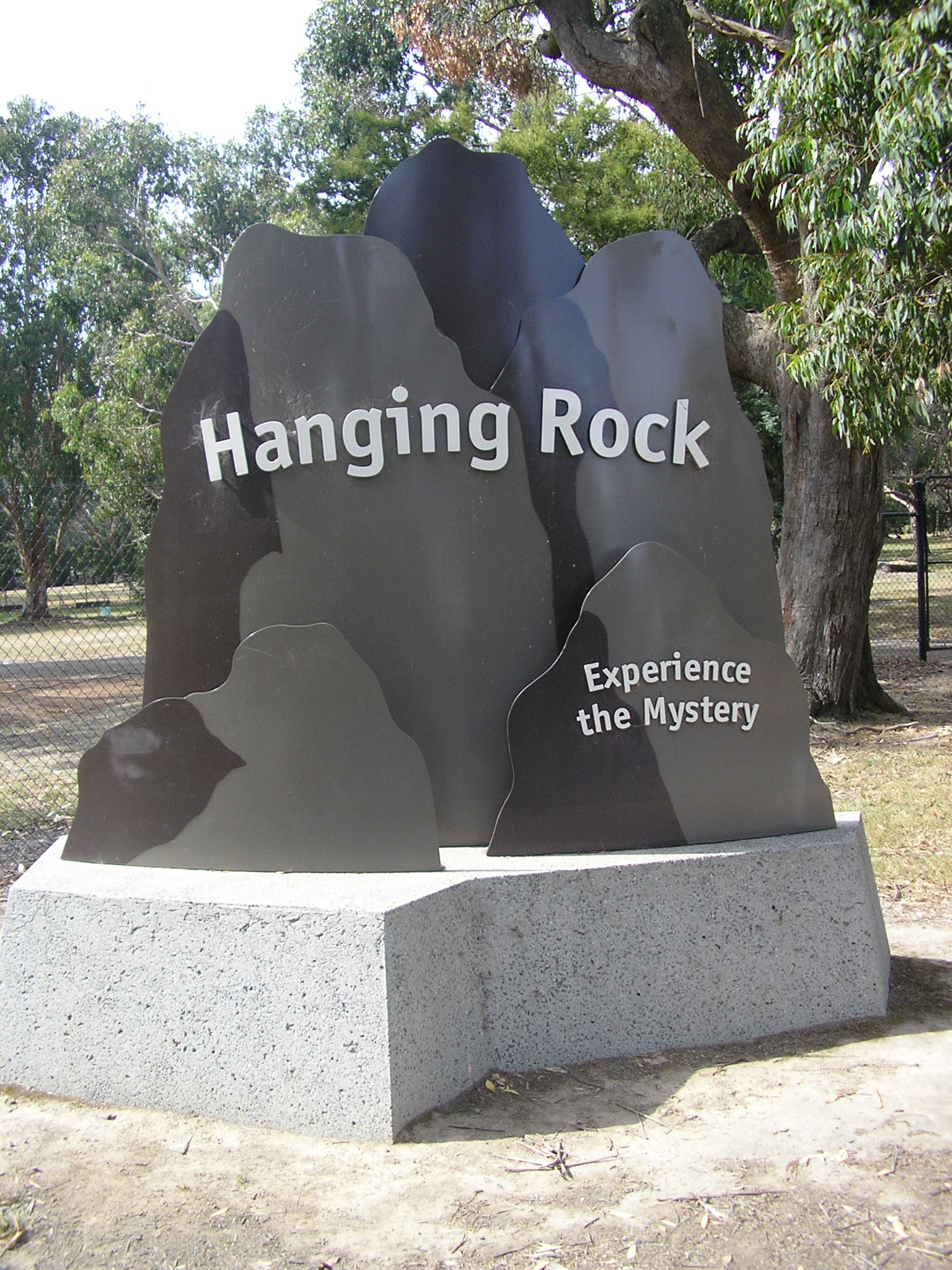
Entrance to Hanging Rock, 2005

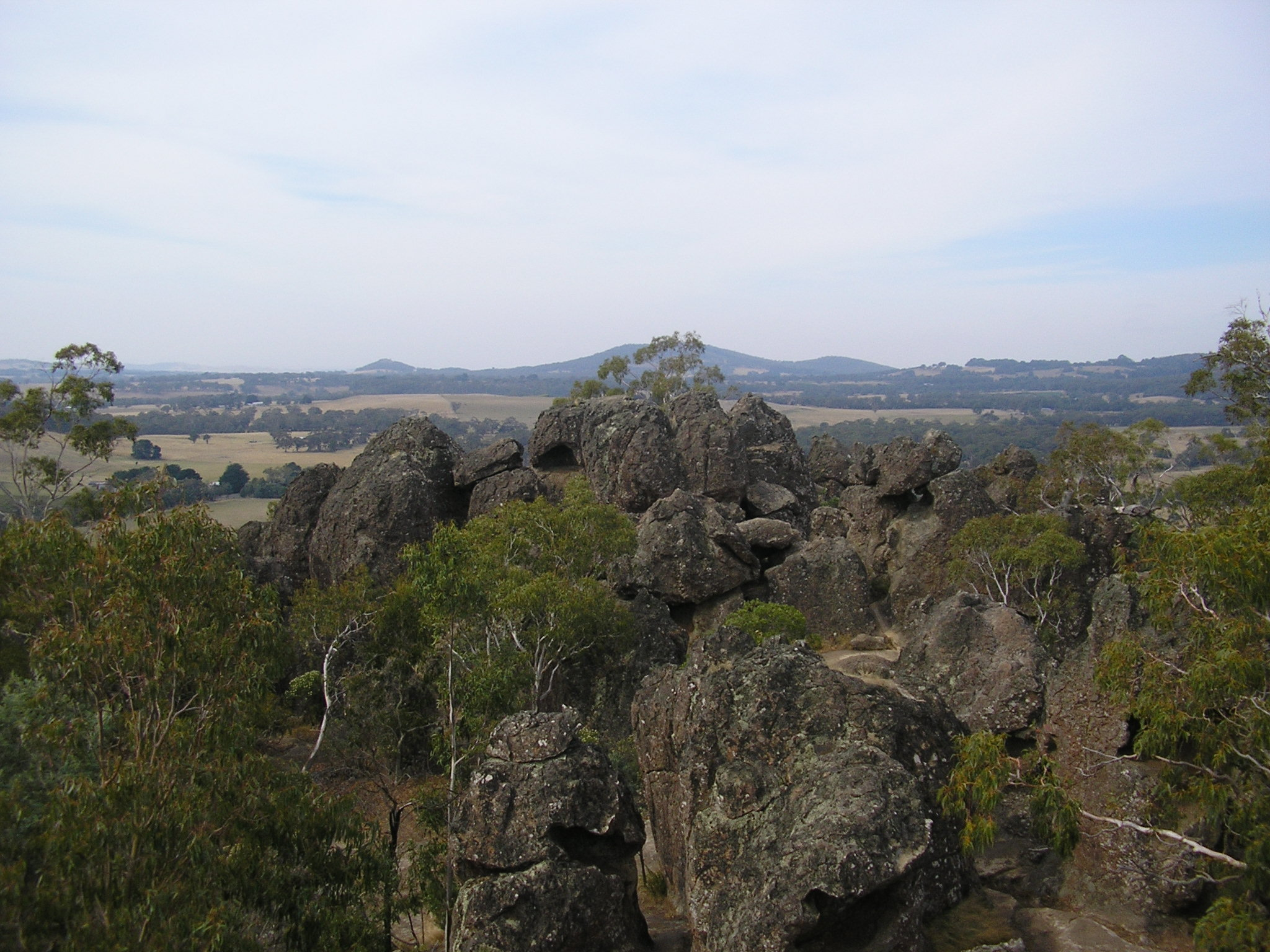
Rock formations, 2005

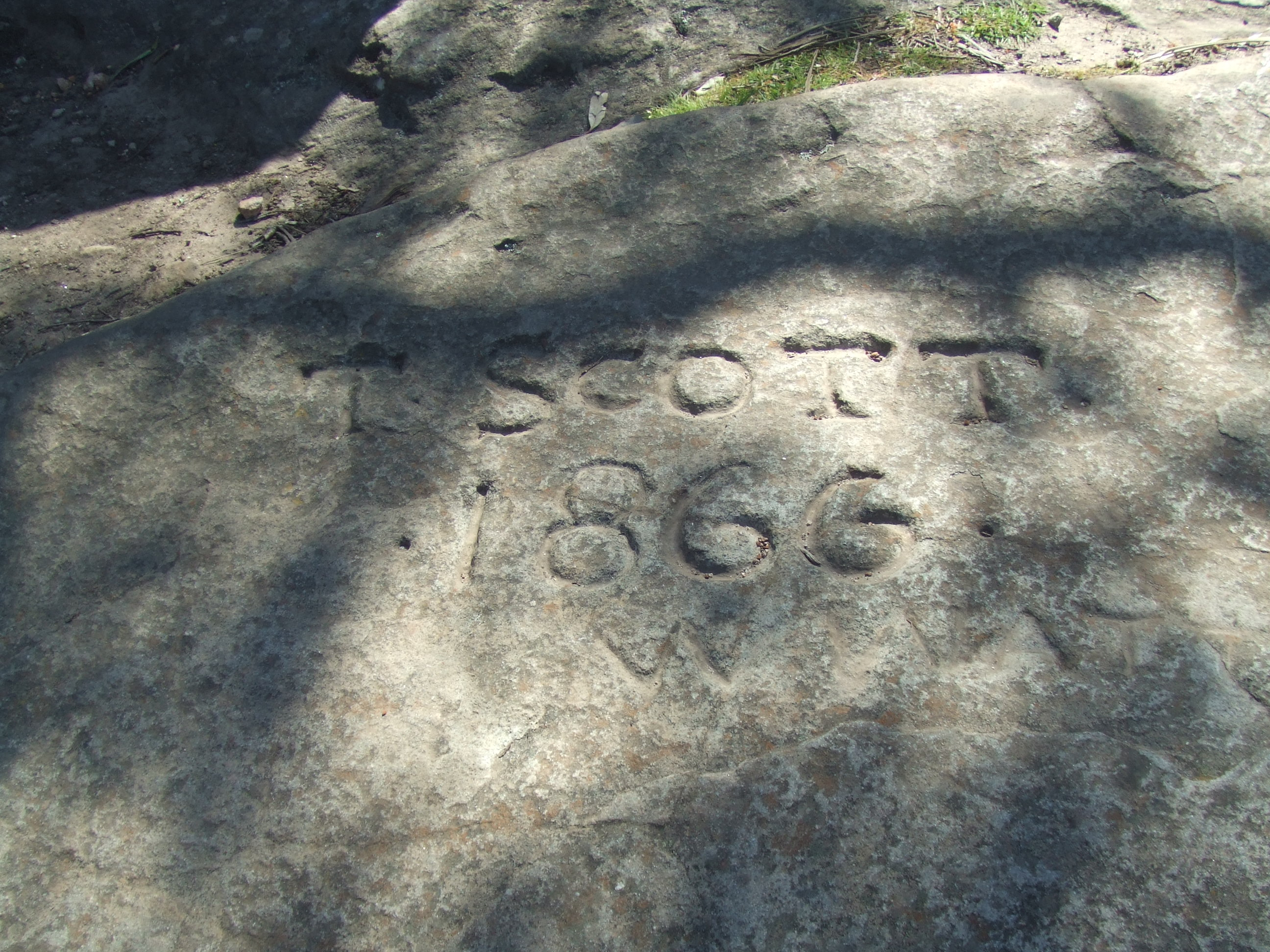
Engraving near the summit, 2009

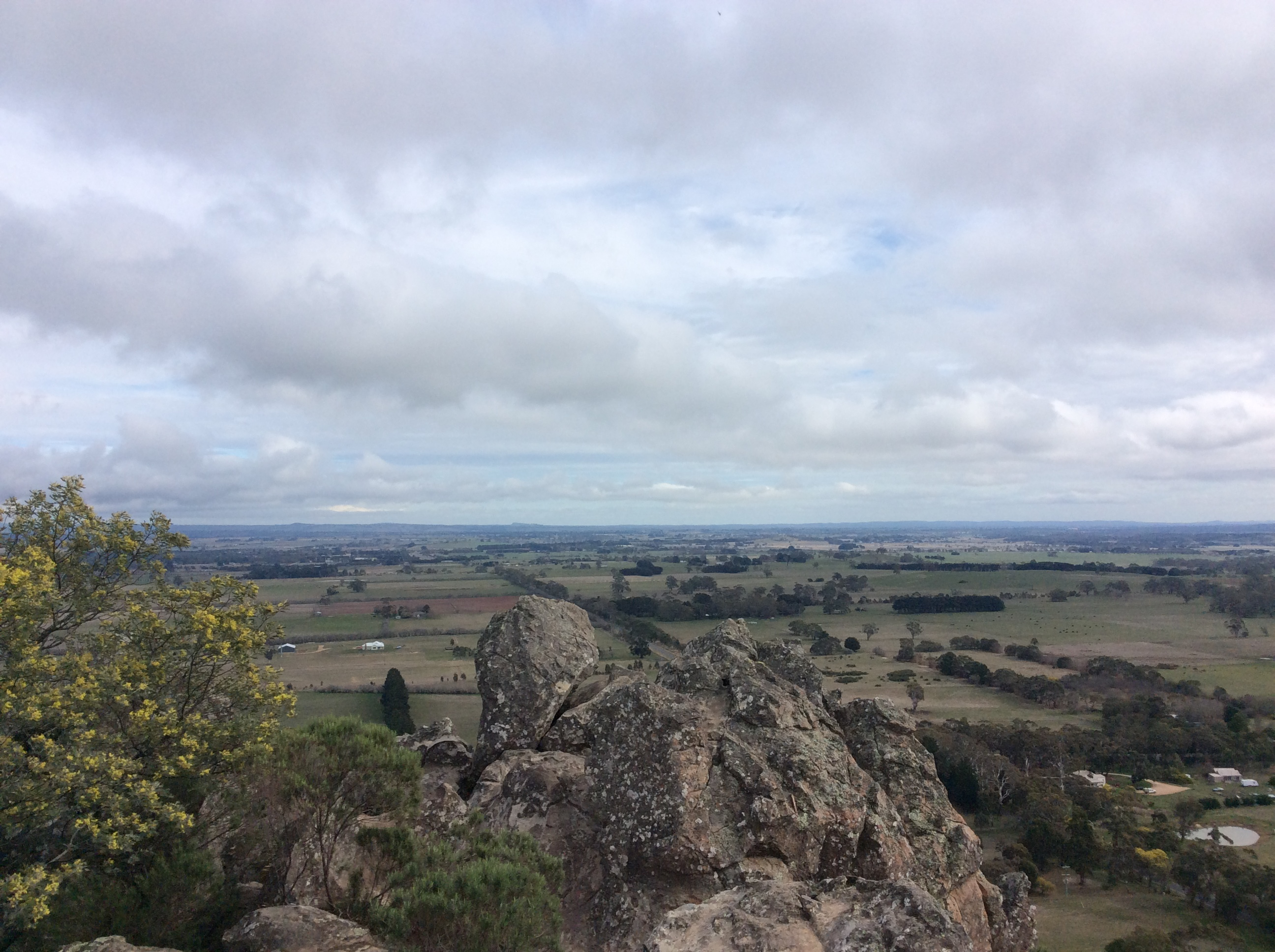
View from Hanging Rock, 2015

== See also ==
- List of mountains in Victoria
