= Woodend, Victoria =

Woodend
- Town
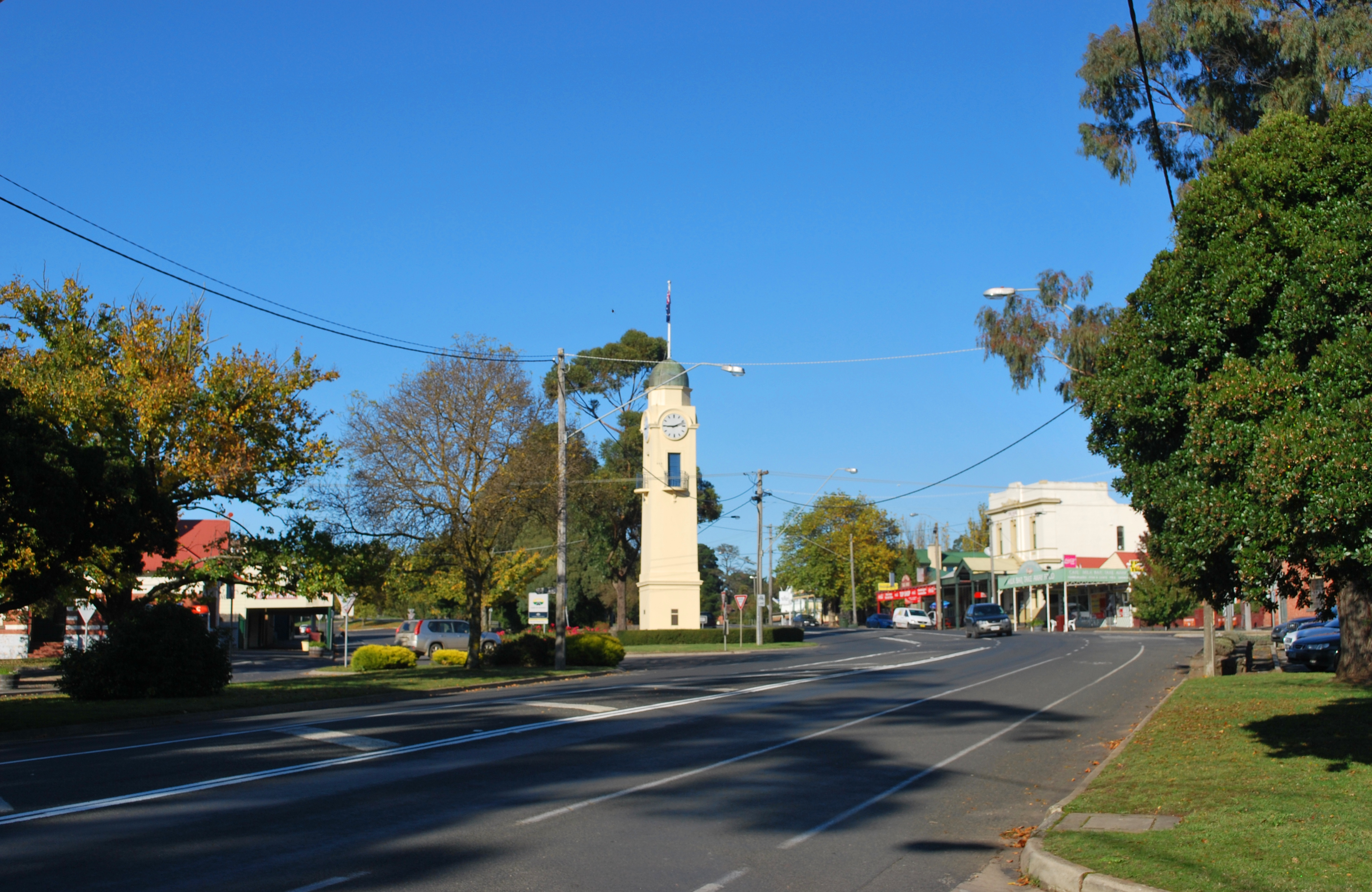
- Woodend's Main Street

- Interactive map of Woodend
- Coordinates: 37.363°S 144.526°E
- Country: Australia
- State: Victoria
- LGA: Shire of Macedon Ranges
- Location: 71 km (44 mi) NW of Melbourne; 79 km (49 mi) SE of Bendigo; 41 km (25 mi) SE of Daylesford

Government
  - State electorate: Macedon
  - Federal division: McEwen
- Elevation: 580 m (1,900 ft)

Population
  - Total: 6,732 (2021 census)
- Postcode: 3442
- Mean max temp: 15.3 °C (59.5 °F)
- Mean min temp: 7.1 °C (44.8 °F)
- Annual rainfall: 843.9 mm (33.22 in)
Localities around Woodend
Spring Hill and Lauriston	Kyneton	Newham
Tylden, Victoria	Woodend	Hesket
Gisborne	Macedon	Mount Macedon

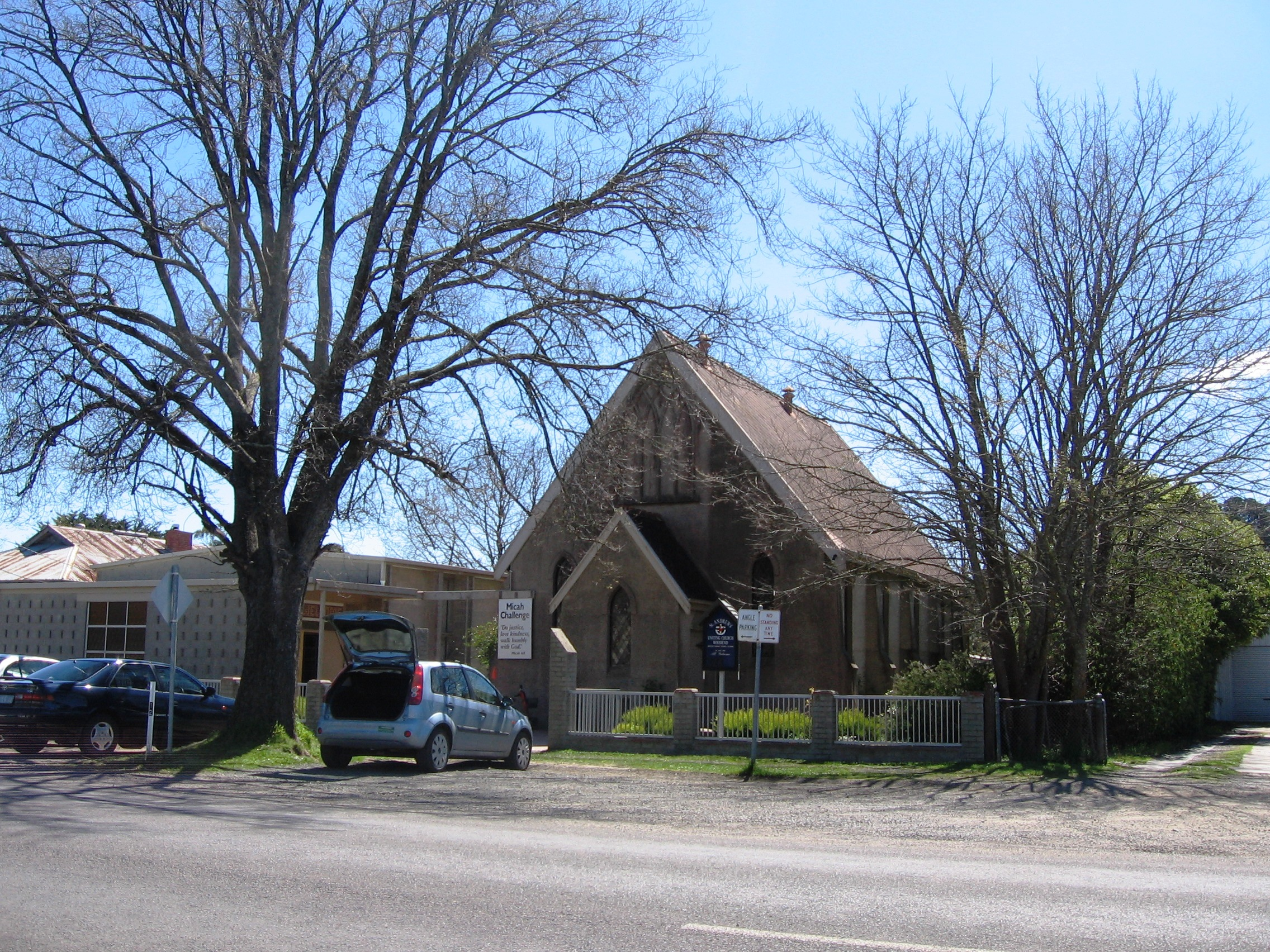
Woodend Uniting Church

Woodend (/wʊdˈɛnd/) is a town in Victoria, Australia. The town is in the Shire of Macedon Ranges local government area and is bypassed to the east and north by the Calder Freeway (M79), located about halfway between Melbourne and Bendigo. At the 2021 census, Woodend had a population of 6,732.

== History ==
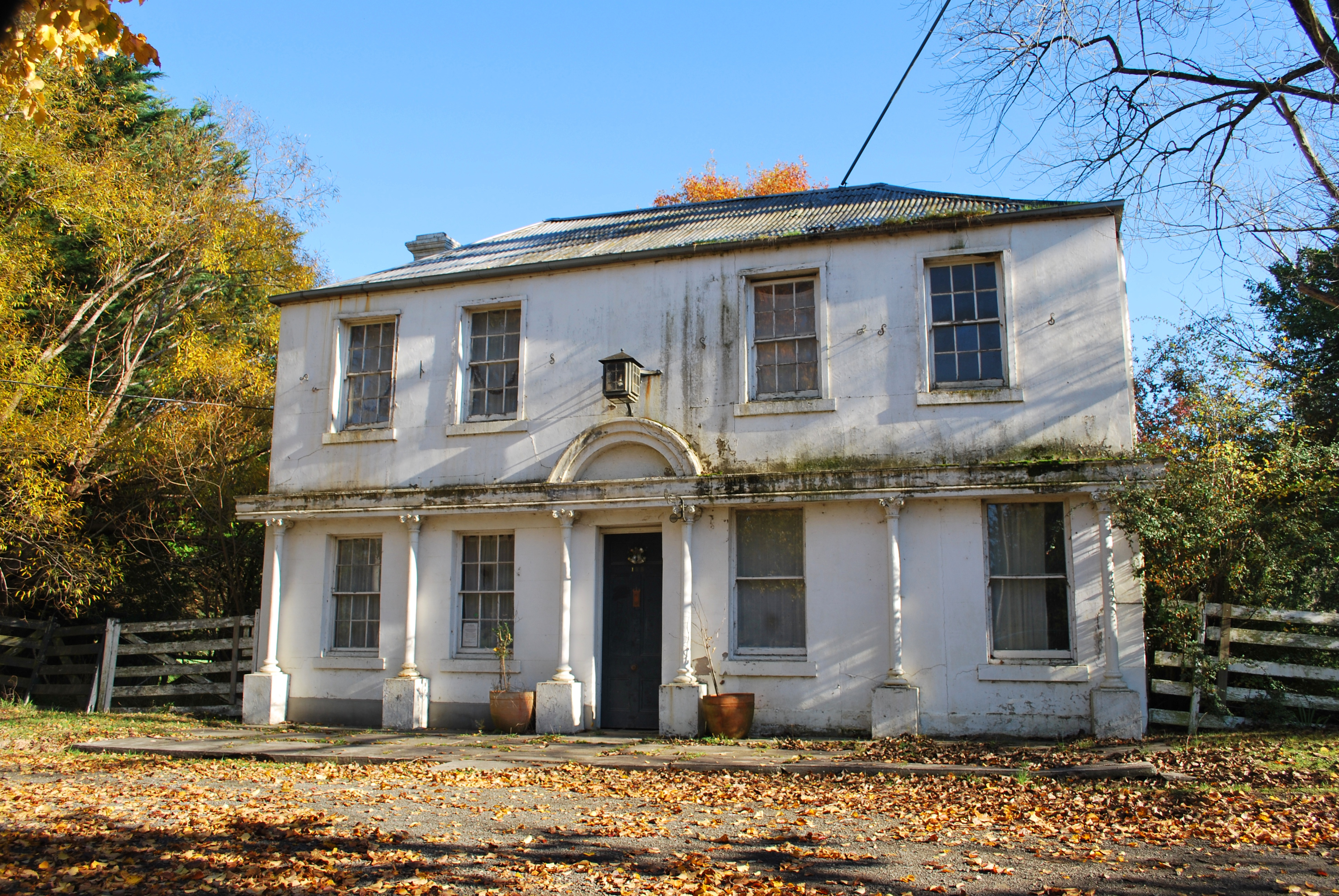
Islay House built in the Colonial style

Woodend was first surveyed in 1836 by Major Thomas Mitchell, who opened it up for settlement. When gold was discovered in the area (towards Bendigo and Ballarat), Woodend became the main thoroughfare through the Black Forest, and accommodated many gold-diggers and their families. Woodend Post Office opened on 20 July 1854; however, it closed shortly after, only to be reopened in one of the citizens' homes.

The Woodend Magistrates' Court closed on 1 January 1983.

== Tourism and attractions ==
Woodend is close to such attractions as Mount Macedon and Hanging Rock located at nearby Newham, and numerous waterfalls. The area supports a large horse-racing community. Woodend's location in the foothills of the Great Dividing Range means that, unlike most of Australia, snowfalls are not uncommon.

The Woodend Winter Arts Festival, held on the King's Birthday Weekend in June, features music performances, talks, exhibitions, literary events and educational programs.

Woodend Children's Park in the centre of the town provides a meeting place for young and old, locals and visitors, with the motto: "A park to explore, to enjoy, to play". Woodend Children's Park opened behind the service station in October 2009.

The largest sporting group in the town is the Woodend Junior Football Club which incorporates 190 players, from 130 families, playing Australian rules football in eight junior teams ranging from Under-9s to Under-16s. There are several mountain bike tracks near Woodend, in the Wombat State Forest and also on Mount Macedon. The local Wombat MTB Club maintains the tracks in the area and arranges events and bike tours. Golfers play at the course of the Woodend Golf Club on Davy Street. The Woodend tennis club on Earnshaw St has six plexipave courts and its vibrant, progressive and rapidly growing membership has become a social hub for the local community. The annual Melbourne Autumn Day (MAD) ride is held in Woodend by the Melbourne Bicycle Touring Club.

The oldest church in Woodend is the Anglican Church of St Mary's, a Gothic bluestone building constructed in 1864. The church's stained glass windows were produced by William Montgomery (1850–1927), former president of the Victorian Artists Society.

The events and news of the town are published in the town's community newsletter, The New Woodend Star, which publishes free archival copies of the newsletter online for reference.

Arrow Health, a drug and alcohol rehabilitation centre is located in Woodend.

A local Woodend information website is also available called Woodend Village News. This also has a local weather page, showing historical weather information, including UV intensity, wind speed and direction, amount of rain, maximum and minimum temperatures, along with wind chill and barometric pressure.

== See also ==
- Woodend railway station, Victoria
- Woodend/Hesket Football Club
