= Riddells Creek railway station =

Railway station in Victoria, Australia

Riddells Creek
- Westbound view from Platform 1, October 2026

General information
- Location: Hamilton Street, Riddells Creek, Victoria 3431; Shire of Macedon Ranges; Australia
- Coordinates: 37°27′54″S 144°40′47″E
- System: PTV regional rail station
- Owner: VicTrack
- Operator: V/Line
- Lines: Bendigo Echuca (Deniliquin)
- Distance: 56.90 kilometres from Southern Cross
- Platforms: 2 side
- Tracks: 2
- Connections: Bus

Construction
- Structure type: Ground
- Parking: 50
- Cycle facilities: Yes
- Accessible: Yes

Other information
- Status: Operational, staffed part-time
- Station code: RCK
- Fare zone: Myki Zone 2
- Website: Public Transport Victoria

History
- Opened: 8 July 1861; 165 years ago
- Rebuilt: 2010; 2014
- Former names: Riddell (1904-1976)

Services
Preceding station	V/Line	Following station
Clarkefield towards Southern Cross	Bendigo line	Gisborne towards Bendigo, Epsom or Eaglehawk
Clarkefield towards Southern Cross	Echuca line	Gisborne towards Echuca
Location
- Location within Victoria

Riddells Creek railway station is a regional railway station operated by V/Line on the Deniliquin line, part of the Victoria rail network. It serves the north-western suburb and town of Ridells Creek, in Victoria, Australia. Riddells Creek is a ground-level unstaffed station, featuring two side platforms. The station opened on 8 July 1861, with the current waiting room and ticket office provided in 2010 and extended platforms provided in 2014.

Initially opened as Riddells Creek, the station was renamed to Riddell on 9 May 1904. It then was renamed back to its current name of Riddells Creek on 12 October 1976.

== History ==
Riddells Creek opened with the line on 8 July 1861. The station, like the township itself, was named after local settler John Riddell, who acquired property in the area in 1841. Riddell later became a member of the Victorian Legislative Council and the Victorian Legislative Assembly.

In 1864, a goods shed and goods platform was provided on the down platform (Platform 2). By 1879, the station had a signal box and was a block post, using the telegraph instruments, with Winter's instruments provided by 1890.

The station was renamed Riddell on 9 May 1904, as part of a policy by the Victorian Railways to adopt short station names. By this time, there was two sidings to the south of Platform 2.

On 12 October 1976, the station was renamed back to Riddells Creek.

A six lever frame was provided in 1927, to control the signals, until it was closed as a block post in April 1993. After this, the signals and interlocking were abolished, and a crossover at the up end of the station was spiked.

As part of the Regional Fast Rail project in 2005, the station received a refurbishment, including new platform facings and new fencing. In 2010, the goods shed was refurbished into a waiting room and ticket office. In January 2014, the platforms were extended to accommodate longer trains.

== Platforms and services ==
Riddells Creek has two side platforms. In the morning, trains to Melbourne depart from Platform 2, and trains to Bendigo depart from Platform 1, with this arrangement reversing in the afternoon. This is to allow services in the peak direction of travel to use the single 160 km/h track that was upgraded in 2006, as part of the Regional Fast Rail project.

It is serviced by V/Line Bendigo and Echuca line services.

Riddells Creek platform arrangement
Platform	Line	Destination	Notes	Via	Source
1	Bendigo line Echuca line	Southern Cross	Services towards Melbourne depart from this platform in the afternoon.	Sunbury	
1	Bendigo line Echuca line	Bendigo, Echuca	Services towards Bendigo depart from this platform in the morning.	Woodend	
2	Bendigo line Echuca line	Southern Cross	Services towards Melbourne depart from this platform in the morning.	Sunbury	
2	Bendigo line Echuca line	Kyneton, Bendigo, Epsom, Eaglehawk, Echuca	Services towards Bendigo depart from this platform in the afternoon.	Woodend	

== Transport links ==
Dysons operates one route via Riddells Creek station, under contract to Public Transport Victoria:

- Lancefield – Gisborne
