= Macedon railway station =

Railway station in Macedon, Victoria, Australia

Macedon
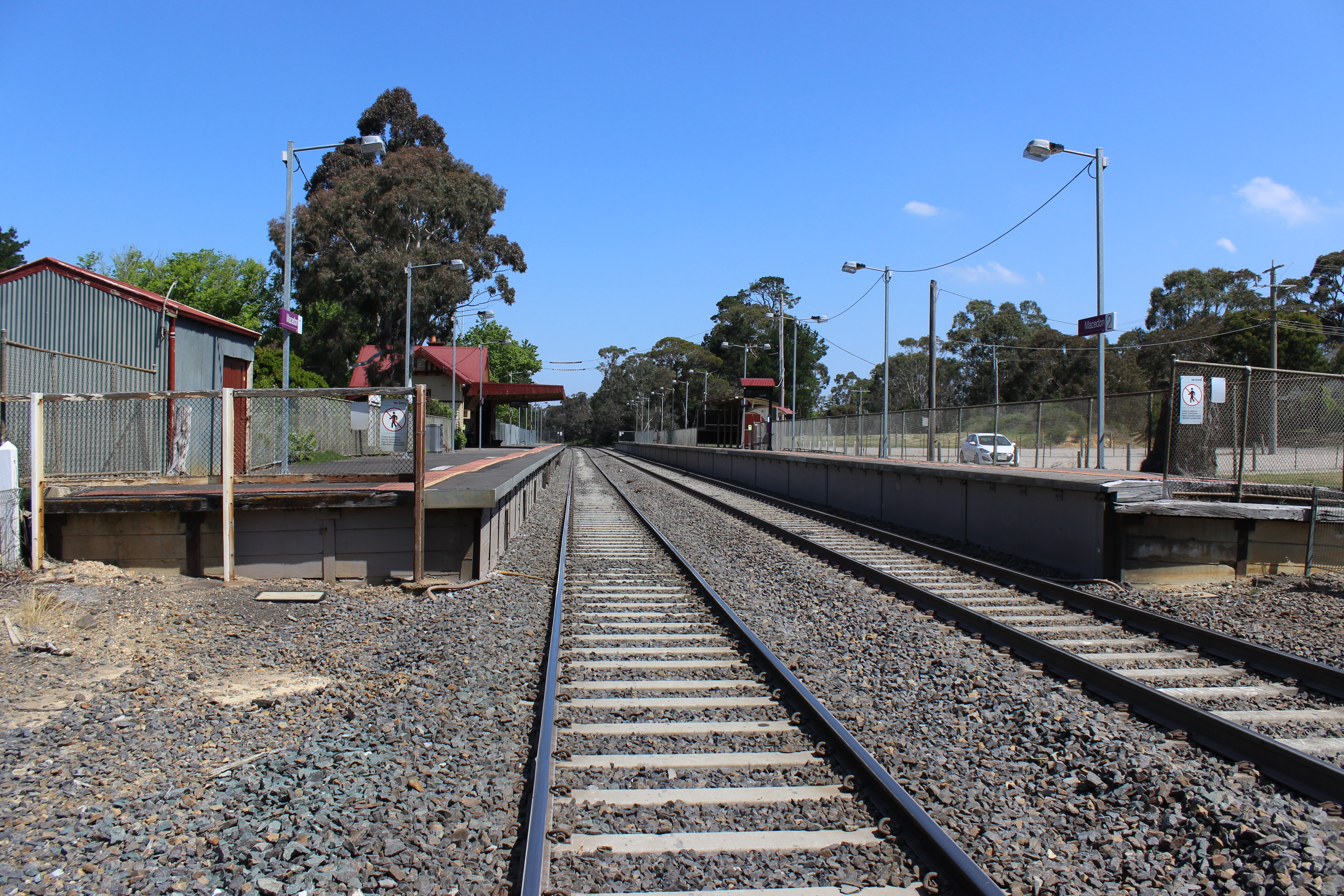
- Southbound view of the station platforms, November 2017

General information
- Location: Smith Street, Macedon, Victoria 3440; Shire of Macedon Ranges; Australia
- Coordinates: 37°25′25″S 144°33′40″E
- System: PTV regional rail station
- Owner: VicTrack
- Operator: V/Line
- Lines: Bendigo Echuca (Deniliquin)
- Distance: 69.79 kilometres from Southern Cross
- Platforms: 2 side
- Tracks: 2

Construction
- Structure type: Ground
- Parking: Yes
- Cycle facilities: Yes
- Accessible: Yes

Other information
- Status: Operational, unstaffed
- Station code: MDN
- Fare zone: Myki zone 3/4
- Website: Public Transport Victoria

History
- Opened: 8 July 1861; 165 years ago
- Rebuilt: March 2014 (platform extensions)
- Former names: Middle Gully (1861-1870)

Services
Preceding station	V/Line	Following station
Gisborne towards Southern Cross	Bendigo line	Woodend towards Bendigo, Epsom or Eaglehawk
Gisborne towards Southern Cross	Echuca line	Woodend towards Echuca
Location
- Location within Victoria

Macedon railway station is a regional railway station operated by V/Line on the Deniliquin line, part of the Victoria rail network. It serves the north-western suburb and town of Macedon, in Victoria, Australia. Macedon is a ground-level unstaffed station, featuring two side platforms. The station opened on 8 July 1861, with the current platform extensions provided in March 2014.

Initially opened as Middle Gully, the station was given its current name of Macedon on 1 April 1870.

== History ==
Sidings and a crossover once existed at the station. By 1984, they were abolished. In 1994, the Victoria Street level crossing, which was located at the down end of the station, was closed to road traffic except for emergency access vehicles. It was closed altogether in 1995.

In March 2014, the platforms were extended to accommodate longer trains.

== Platforms and services ==
Macedon has two side platforms. Before 9 am, trains to Melbourne depart from Platform 2, and trains to Bendigo depart from Platform 1, with this arrangement reversing after 9 am. This is to allow services in the peak direction of travel to use the single 160 km/h track that was upgraded in 2006, as part of the Regional Fast Rail project.

It is serviced by V/Line Bendigo and Echuca line services.

Macedon platform arrangement
Platform	Line	Destination	Notes	Via	Source
1	Bendigo line Echuca line	Southern Cross	Services towards Melbourne depart from this platform in the afternoon.	Sunbury	
1	Bendigo line Echuca line	Bendigo, Echuca	Services towards Bendigo depart from this platform in the morning.	Woodend	
2	Bendigo line Echuca line	Southern Cross	Services towards Melbourne depart from this platform in the morning.	Sunbury	
2	Bendigo line Echuca line	Kyneton, Bendigo, Epsom, Eaglehawk, Echuca	Services towards Bendigo depart from this platform in the afternoon.	Woodend	
