= Gisborne railway station =

Railway station in Victoria, Australia

Gisborne
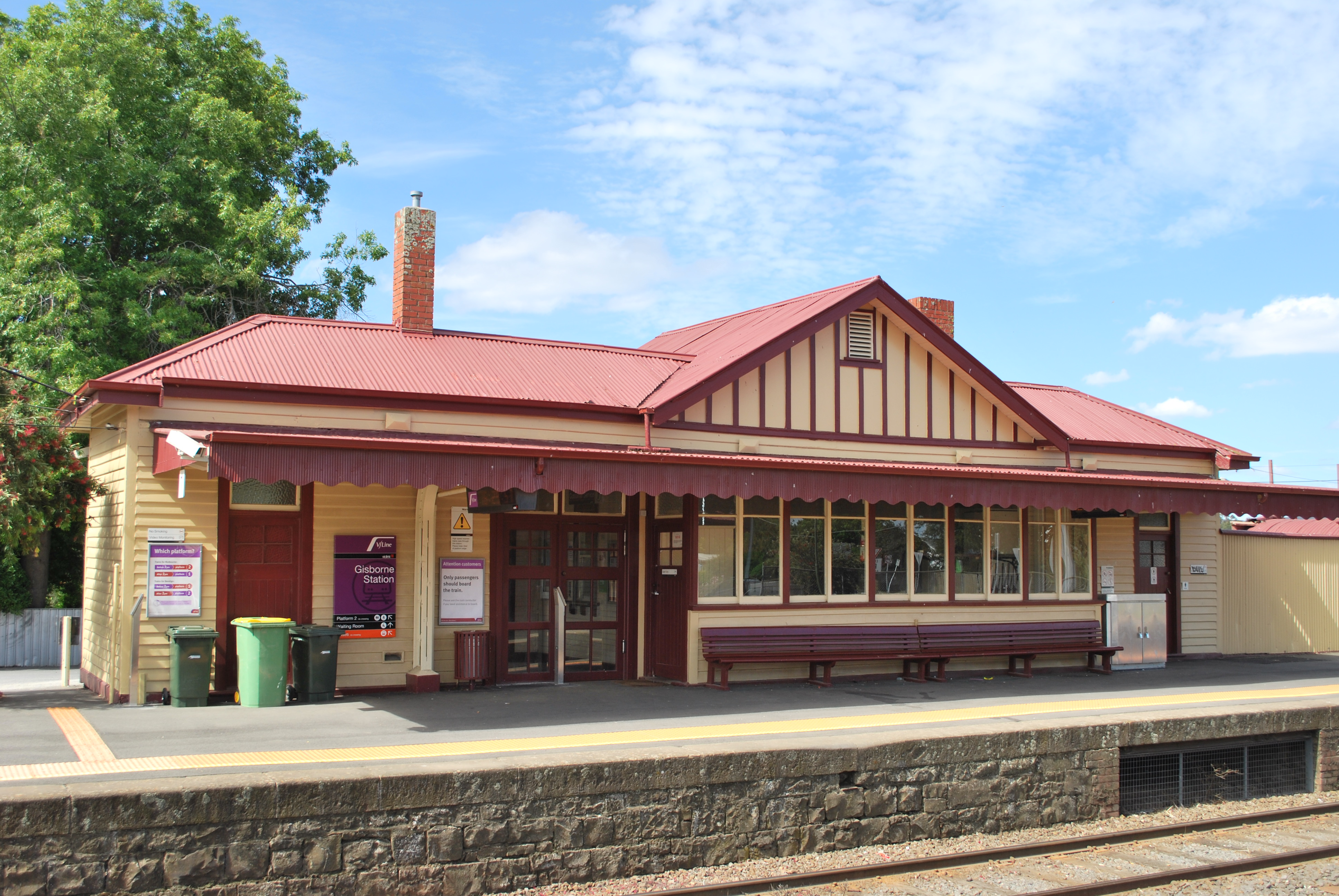
- Station building in 2008

General information
- Location: Station Road, New Gisborne, Victoria 3438; Shire of Macedon Ranges; Australia
- Coordinates: 37°27′32″S 144°35′56″E
- System: PTV regional rail station
- Owner: VicTrack
- Operator: V/Line
- Lines: Bendigo Echuca Swan Hill (Deniliquin)
- Distance: 64.21 kilometres from Southern Cross
- Platforms: 2 side
- Tracks: 2
- Connections: Bus

Construction
- Structure type: Ground
- Parking: 250 bays
- Cycle facilities: Yes (Parkiteer cage)
- Accessible: Yes

Other information
- Status: Operational, staffed part-time
- Station code: GSB
- Fare zone: Myki zone 3/4
- Website: Public Transport Victoria

History
- Opened: 8 July 1861; 165 years ago

Passengers
- 2013–2014: 141,393
- 2014–2015: 145,318 ▲2.77%
- 2015–2016: 148,318 ▲2.06%
- 2016–2017: 152,358 ▲2.72%
- 2017–2018: Not measured
- 2018–2019: 162,500 ▲6.65%
- 2019–2020: 129,050 ▼20.58%
- 2020–2021: 60,000 ▼53.5%

Services
Preceding station	V/Line	Following station
Riddells Creek towards Southern Cross	Bendigo line	Macedon towards Bendigo, Epsom or Eaglehawk
Riddells Creek towards Southern Cross	Echuca line	Macedon towards Echuca
Watergardens towards Southern Cross	Swan Hill line	Woodend towards Swan Hill
Location
- Location within Victoria

Gisborne railway station is a regional railway station operated by V/Line on the Deniliquin and Bendigo lines, part of the Victoria rail network. It serves the north-western suburb and town of New Gisborne, in Gisborne, Victoria, Australia. Gisborne is a ground-level part-time staffed station, featuring two side platforms. The station opened on 8 July 1861.

== History ==
Gisborne station opened on 8 July 1861, when the railway line was extended from Sunbury to Woodend. Like the town itself, the station was after Henry Fyshe Gisborne, who was Commissioner of Crown Lands for the Port Phillip District between 1839 and 1840.

In 1910, the station became a block post for all trains on the line. In 1922, an interlocking frame was provided in the station building on Platform 1.

By 1990, siding "B" and the track that passed through the former goods shed were abolished. In 1994, the connection between siding "A" and a crossover, that was located at the up end of the station, was removed. In 1996, boom barriers replaced hand gates at the Station Road level crossing, located at the down end of the station. The up end crossover was also removed by that year. In 2000, the goods shed was destroyed by fire.

On 17 January 2005, the interlocking frame was abolished. In March 2014, the platforms were extended to accommodate longer trains.

== Platforms and services ==
Gisborne has two side platforms. During the morning peak, services to Southern Cross depart from Platform 2, and services to Bendigo depart from Platform 1, with this arrangement reversing after 9:00 am. This is to allow services in the peak direction of travel to use the single 160 km/h track that was upgraded in 2006, as part of the Regional Fast Rail project.

One of the station buildings were once at the old Holden railway station and was relocated once it closed

The station is serviced by V/Line Bendigo, Echuca and Swan Hill line services.

Gisborne platform arrangement
Platform	Line	Destination	Notes	Via	Source
1	Bendigo line Echuca line Swan Hill line	Southern Cross	Services towards Melbourne depart from this platform in the afternoon.	Sunbury	
1	Bendigo line Echuca line Swan Hill line	Bendigo, Echuca	Services towards Bendigo depart from this platform in the morning.	Woodend	
2	Bendigo line Echuca line Swan Hill line	Southern Cross	Services towards Melbourne depart from this platform in the morning.	Sunbury	
2	Bendigo line Echuca line Swan Hill line	Kyneton, Bendigo, Epsom, Eaglehawk, Echuca, Swan Hill	Services towards Bendigo depart from this platform in the afternoon.	Woodend	

== Transport links ==
Dysons operates one route via Gisborne station, under contract to Public Transport Victoria:

- Lancefield – Gisborne

Gisborne Transit operates two routes to and from Gisborne station, under contract to Public Transport Victoria:

- 473 : to Gisborne
- 474 : to Gisborne (on-demand service)
