= Clarkefield railway station =

Railway station in Victoria, Australia

Clarkefield
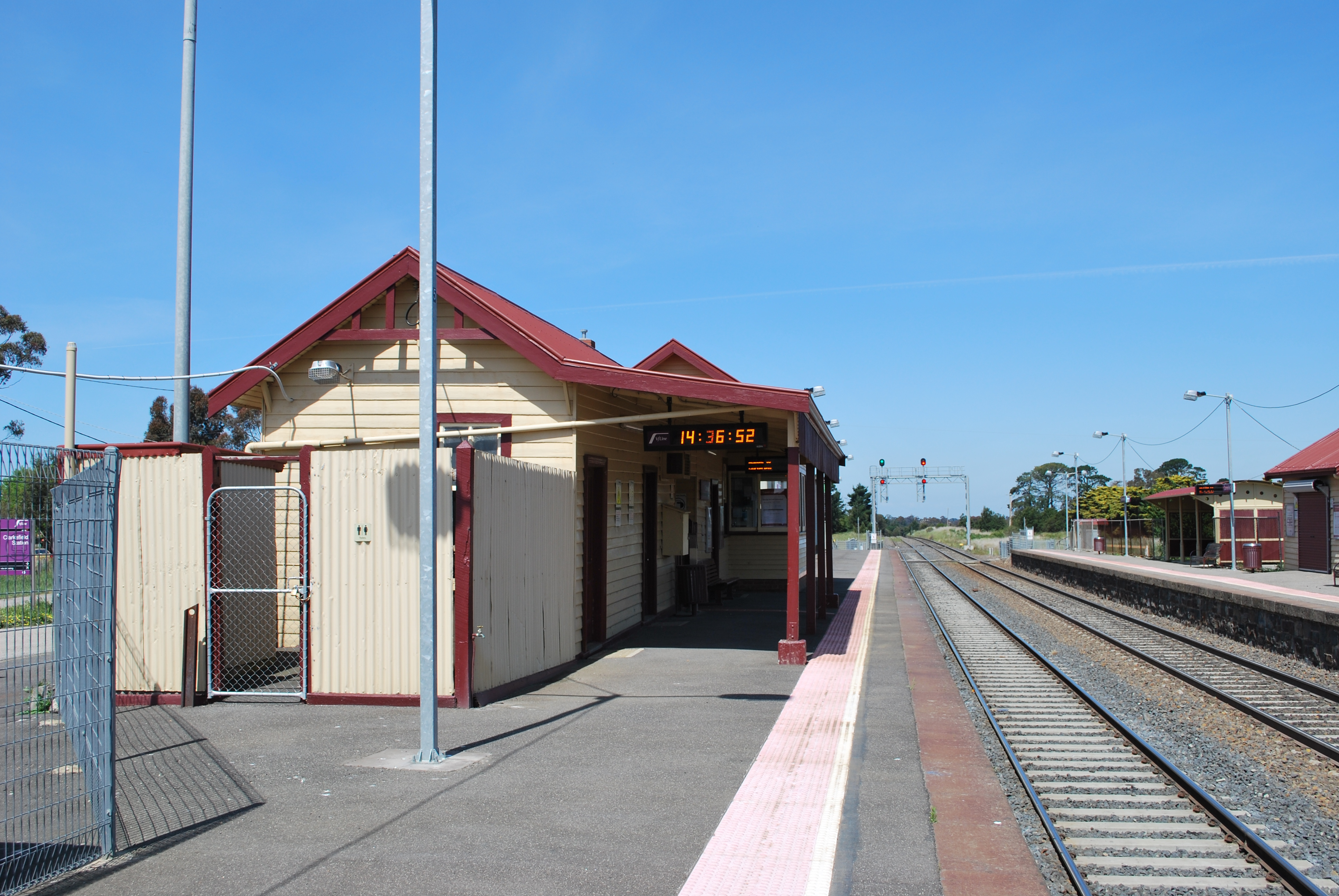
- Southbound view from Platform 1, October 2012

General information
- Location: Station Street, Clarkefield, Victoria 3430; Shire of Macedon Ranges; Australia
- Coordinates: 37°29′01″S 144°44′45″E
- System: PTV regional rail station
- Owner: VicTrack
- Operator: V/Line
- Lines: Bendigo Echuca (Deniliquin)
- Distance: 50.42 kilometres from Southern Cross
- Platforms: 2 side
- Tracks: 2
- Connections: Bus

Construction
- Structure type: Ground
- Parking: 5
- Accessible: Yes

Other information
- Status: Operational, staffed part-time
- Station code: CFD
- Fare zone: Myki zone 2
- Website: Public Transport Victoria

History
- Opened: December 1862; 163 years ago
- Former names: Lancefield Road (1862-1881); Lancefield Junction (1881-1926); Clarkfield (1926)

Services
Preceding station	V/Line	Following station
Sunbury towards Southern Cross	Bendigo line	Riddells Creek towards Bendigo, Epsom or Eaglehawk
Sunbury towards Southern Cross	Echuca line	Riddells Creek towards Echuca
Former services
Preceding station	Disused railways	Following station
Junction	Lancefield line	Bolinda
Location
- Location within Victoria

Clarkefield railway station is a regional railway station operated by V/Line on the Deniliquin line, part of the Victoria rail network. It serves the north-western suburb and town of Clarkefield, in Victoria, Australia. Clarkefield is a ground-level unstaffed station, featuring two side platforms. The station opened in December 1862.

The station had various names. It initially opened as Lancefield Road, then it was renamed to Lancefield Junction in 1881. Then it had two various names of the same pronunciation, but different spelling. It was renamed to Clarkfield on 11 January 1926, then finally was given its current name of Clarkefield on 23 February 1926.

== History ==
Clarkefield opened in December 1862, a year after the line opened between Sunbury and Woodend. The station, like the township itself, was named after local pastoralist, businessman and philanthropist, Sir William Clarke. Clarke later became a member of the Victorian Legislative Council.

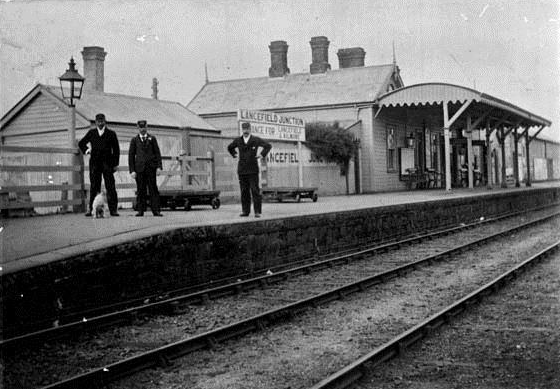
Lancefield Junction station platform and building, 1890

The station was the junction for the Lancefield branch line, which operated between 1881 and 1956. The station was historically known as Lancefield Junction for this reason.

Catch points were in use at Clarkefield in 1929. By 1935, they were abolished. In 1947, the signal box at the station was replaced with a signal bay.

After the closure of the Lancefield line in 1956, a small remnant of the line became a refuge siding. Around 1958/1959, a siding that operated between the up mainline track and the former dock platform was abolished, and the siding leading to the turntable was removed by 1959.

In 1977, the connections from the refuge siding to the up line was spiked out of use, with the auxiliary frame also abolished around this time.

On 17 January 2005, the signal bay at the station was abolished.

Disused station Rupertswood is located between Clarkefield and Sunbury stations.

== Platforms and services ==
Clarkefield has two side platforms. In the morning, trains to Melbourne depart from Platform 2, and trains to Bendigo depart from Platform 1, with this arrangement reversing in the afternoon. This is to allow services in the peak direction of travel to use the single 160 km/h track that was upgraded in 2006, as part of the Regional Fast Rail project.

It is serviced by V/Line Bendigo and Echuca line services.

Clarkefield platform arrangement
Platform	Line	Destination	Notes	Via	Source
1	Bendigo line Echuca line	Southern Cross	Services towards Melbourne depart from this platform in the afternoon.	Sunbury	
1	Bendigo line Echuca line	Bendigo, Echuca	Services towards Bendigo depart from this platform in the morning.	Woodend	
2	Bendigo line Echuca line	Southern Cross	Services towards Melbourne depart from this platform in the morning. Services	Sunbury	
2	Bendigo line Echuca line	Kyneton, Bendigo, Epsom, Eaglehawk, Echuca	towards Bendigo depart from this platform in the afternoon.	Woodend	

== Transport links ==
Dysons operates one route via Clarkefield station, under contract to Public Transport Victoria:

- Lancefield – Sunbury station
