= Malmsbury railway station =

Railway station in Victoria, Australia

Malmsbury
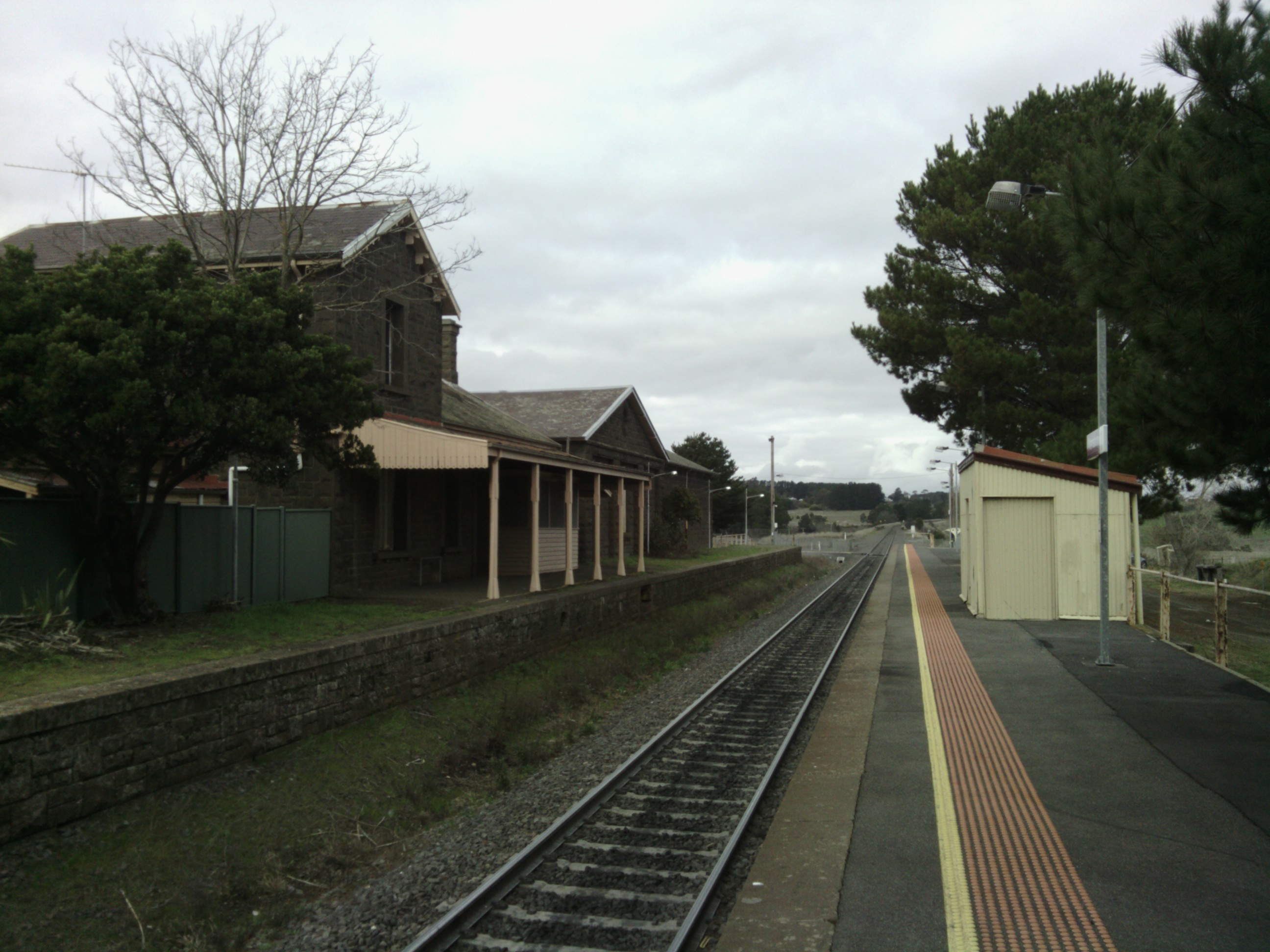
- Eastbound view from the single station platform, July 2015

General information
- Location: Daylesford–Malmsbury Road, Malmsbury, Victoria 3446; Shire of Macedon Ranges; Australia
- Coordinates: 37°11′23″S 144°22′31″E
- System: PTV regional rail station
- Owner: VicTrack
- Operator: V/Line
- Lines: Bendigo Echuca Swan Hill (Deniliquin)
- Distance: 102.16 kilometres from Southern Cross
- Platforms: 1 side platform
- Tracks: 1

Construction
- Structure type: At-grade
- Parking: Yes
- Accessible: Yes

Other information
- Status: Operational, unstaffed
- Station code: MMY
- Fare zone: Myki zone 7/8
- Website: Public Transport Victoria

History
- Opened: 21 October 1862; 164 years ago

Services
Preceding station	V/Line	Following station
Kyneton towards Southern Cross	Bendigo line	Castlemaine towards Bendigo, Epsom or Eaglehawk
Kyneton towards Southern Cross	Echuca line	Castlemaine towards Echuca
Kyneton One-way operation	Swan Hill line 1 weekday & 1 weekend service	Castlemaine towards Swan Hill
Former service
Preceding station	Disused railways	Following station
Redesdale Junction	Deniliquin line	Taradale

Victorian Heritage Register
- Official name: Malmsbury Railway Station
- Designated: 20 August 1982
- Reference no.: H1574
Location
- Location within Victoria

Malmsbury railway station is a regional railway station operated by V/Line on the Deniliquin and Bendigo lines, part of the Victoria rail network. It serves the north-western town of Malmsbury, in Victoria, Australia. Malmsbury is a ground-level unstaffed station, featuring one side platform. The station opened on 21 October 1862.

Disused stations at Taradale and Elphinstone are located between Malmsbury and Castlemaine. Chewton station, which has been demolished, was also located between Malmsbury and Castlemaine, while the former Redesdale Junction was located between Malmsbury and Kyneton.

== History ==
In 1968, a carriage dock and a number of sidings were removed. Further sidings were removed in 1978.

A large bluestone station building remains on the disused northern platform, and there is a collection of shelter sheds on the southern platform. As part of the Regional Fast Rail project in 2006, the double-track line from Kyneton to Bendigo was converted to single track, with the track on the former Melbourne-bound platform removed.

On 31 January 2024, the station building on the disused northern platform was damaged by fire. The fire brigade managed to confine the blaze to the former station office and signal bay. Police charged two teenagers from Bendigo with arson.

== Platforms and services ==
Malmsbury has one side platform. It is served by V/Line Bendigo and Echuca line trains in both directions, and one weekday and one weekend Swan Hill line service.

Malmsbury platform arrangement
Platform	Line	Destination	Via	Source
1	Bendigo line Echuca line Swan Hill line	Southern Cross	Sunbury	
1	Bendigo line Echuca line Swan Hill line	Bendigo, Epsom, Eaglehawk, Echuca, Swan Hill	Castlemaine	
