= Woodend railway station, Victoria =

Railway station in Victoria, Australia

Woodend
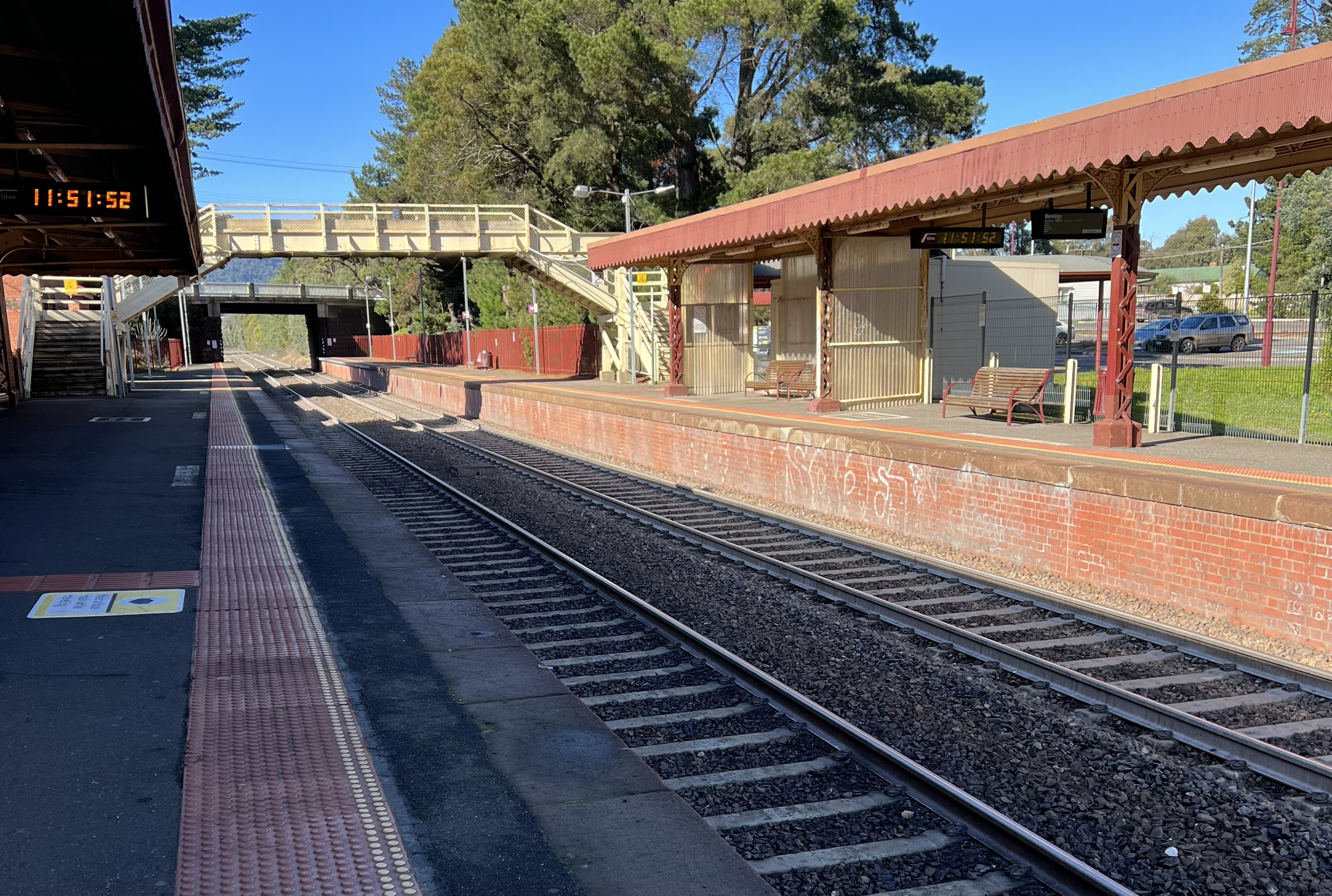
- Eastbound view from Platform 1, July 2022

General information
- Location: Calder Highway, Woodend, Victoria 3442; Shire of Macedon Ranges; Australia
- Coordinates: 37°21′33″S 144°31′34″E
- System: PTV regional rail station
- Owner: VicTrack
- Operator: V/Line
- Lines: Bendigo Echuca Swan Hill (Deniliquin)
- Distance: 78.09 kilometres from Southern Cross
- Platforms: 2 side
- Tracks: 2
- Connections: Bus

Construction
- Structure type: Ground
- Parking: Yes
- Cycle facilities: Yes
- Accessible: Yes

Other information
- Status: Operational, staffed
- Station code: WNO
- Fare zone: Myki zone 4/5
- Website: Public Transport Victoria

History
- Opened: 8 July 1861; 165 years ago

Services
Preceding station	V/Line	Following station
Macedon towards Southern Cross	Bendigo line	Kyneton towards Bendigo, Epsom or Eaglehawk
Macedon towards Southern Cross	Echuca line	Kyneton towards Echuca
Gisborne towards Southern Cross	Swan Hill line	Kyneton towards Swan Hill
Location
- Location within Victoria

Woodend railway station is a regional railway station operated by V/Line on the Deniliquin and Bendigo lines, part of the Victoria rail network. It serves the north-western suburb and town of Woodend, in Victoria, Australia. Woodend is a ground-level staffed station, featuring two side platforms. The station opened on 8 July 1861.

The disused Carlsruhe station is located between Woodend and Kyneton stations.

== History ==
At the time of opening, Woodend was the terminus of the railway line which had been extended from Sunbury. It remained the terminus until the line was further extended to Kyneton the next year. (Note: The line terminated at Sunbury for two years after 1859, until Woodend became the terminus in 1861. Kyneton station was opened in 1862)

In December 1897, the original station building was destroyed by fire.

In 1960, a crossover at the up end of the station was abolished.

The station once had extra sidings on the far side of Platform 2, as well as a turntable. The sidings were abolished in February 1990, and the turntable was relocated to Castlemaine in the early 1990s, for use by the Victorian Goldfields Railway.

In March 1995, the signal box was abolished, and was replaced with a signal bay in the Platform 1 station building. A crossover at the down end of the station had been removed by March of that year, along with the turntable road. On 17 January 2005, the signal bay itself was abolished.

The original stationmaster's house still stands. It was built in 1897 and, at the time, the stationmaster was able to see along the track from the doorways.

== Platforms and services ==
Woodend has two side platforms and is served by V/Line Bendigo, Echuca and Swan Hill line trains.

During the morning peak, trains to Melbourne depart from Platform 2, and trains to Bendigo depart from Platform 1. That is reversed after 8:30am, to allow trains travelling in the "peak" direction to use the one 160 km/h track, upgraded in 2006 as part of the Regional Fast Rail project.

Woodend platform arrangement
Platform	Line	Destination	Notes	Via	Source
1	Bendigo line Echuca line Swan Hill line	Southern Cross	Services towards Melbourne depart from this platform in the afternoon.	Sunbury	
1	Bendigo line Echuca line Swan Hill line	Bendigo, Echuca	Services towards Bendigo depart from this platform in the morning.	Castlemaine	
2	Bendigo line Echuca line Swan Hill line	Southern Cross	Services towards Melbourne depart from this platform in the morning.	Sunbury	
2	Bendigo line Echuca line Swan Hill line	Kyneton, Bendigo, Epsom, Eaglehawk, Echuca, Swan Hill	Services towards Bendigo depart from this platform in the afternoon.	Castlemaine	

== Transport links ==
Dysons operates one bus route via Woodend station, under contract to Public Transport Victoria:

- FlexiRide Woodend

V/Line operates a bus service connecting Daylesford with Woodend station, giving passengers from Daylesford, and intermediate towns including Lyonville, Trentham and Tylden, access to the rail network.

- V/Line Coach Service

== Gallery ==
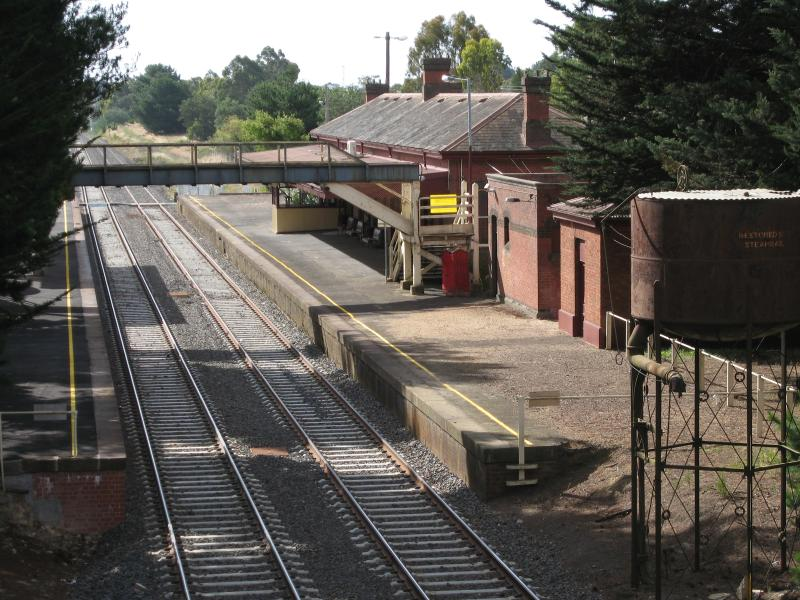
Westbound view of station platforms and building, September 2006

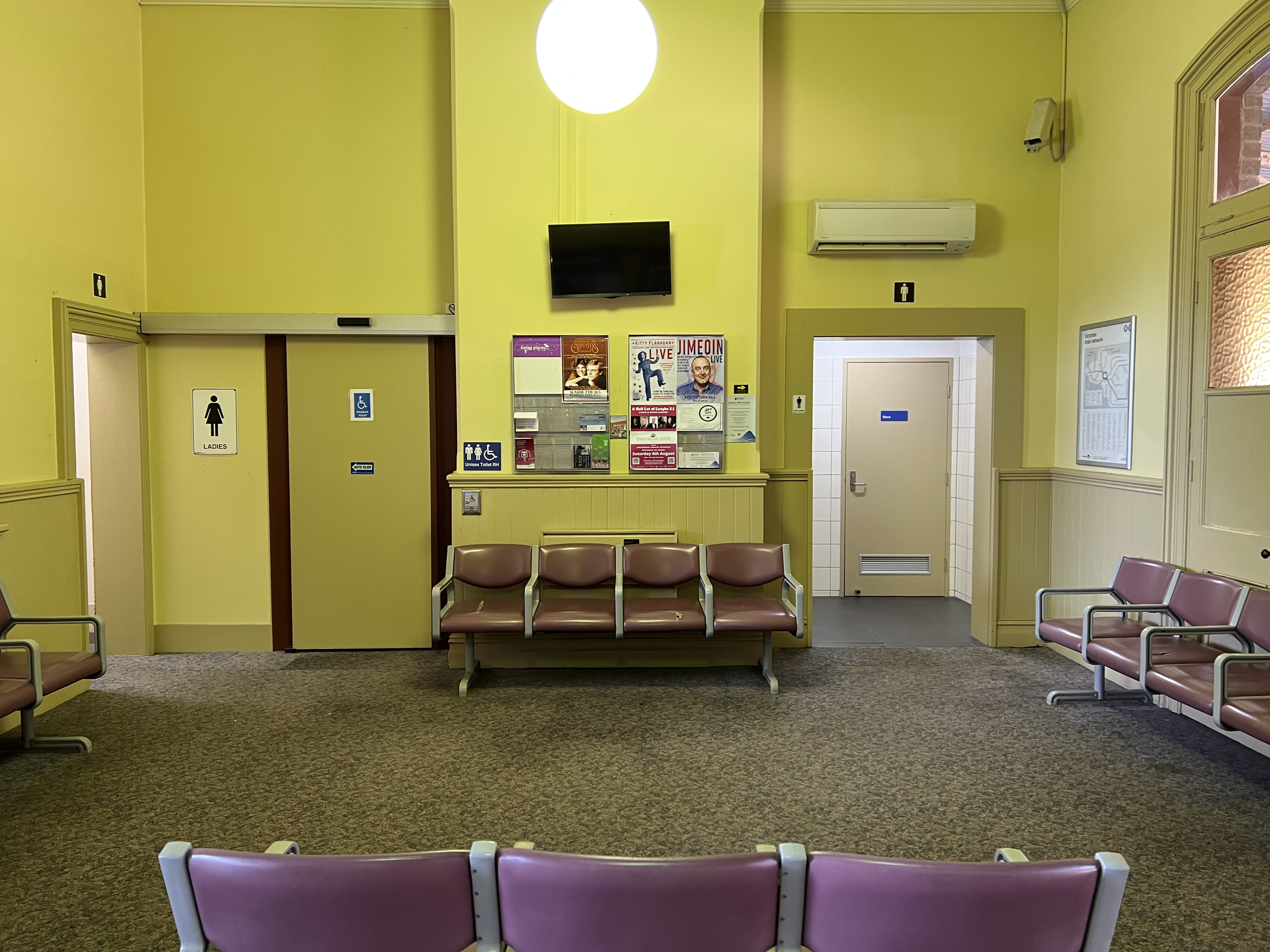
Platform 1 station waiting room, July 2022

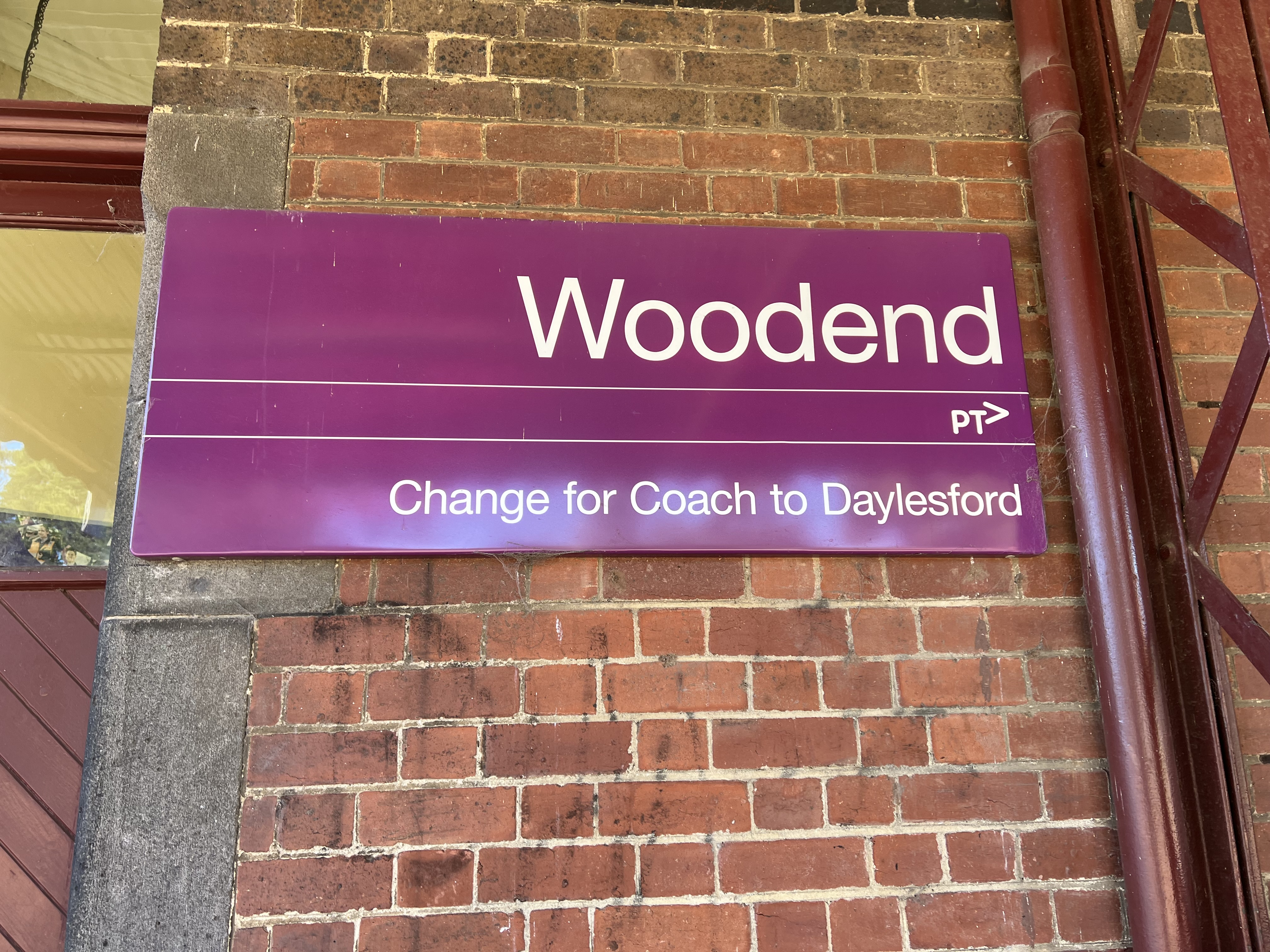
Woodend station signage at Platform 1, July 2022
