= Rupertswood railway station =

Former railway station in Victoria, Australia

Rupertswood
- Remains of the platform in September 2026

General information
- Coordinates: 37°34′15″S 144°44′11″E
- Owner: VicTrack
- Operator: V/Line
- Line: Bendigo
- Distance: 41.5 kilometres from Southern Cross
- Platforms: 2 side
- Tracks: 2

Construction
- Structure type: Ground

Other information
- Status: Closed
- Station code: RPW

History
- Opened: 1879 (private); 7 February 1962 (public)
- Closed: December 2004

Services
Preceding station	Disused railways	Following station
Sunbury	Deniliquin railway line	Clarkefield
	List of closed railway stations in Victoria	
Track layout
Location

Rupertswood was a railway station located in the north-western Melbourne suburb of Sunbury on the Melbourne – Bendigo line. It was provided in 1879 as a private platform for William John Clarke. Although eventually opened to general passengers in February 1962, train services only stopped to pick up and set down students attending the adjacent Salesian College.

== History ==
When it was opened, Rupertswood was a single platform on the down line, provided for the convenience of guests at "Rupertswood", the country residence of William John Clarke, who became Australia's first baronet. His townhouse was "Cliveden", in Wellington Parade, Melbourne. In addition to people attending garden parties at Rupertswood, the platform was used on approximately 15 occasions between July 1879 and February 1890, for various groups, such as Sunday school excursions. The Findon Harriers and the Sunbury Racing Club also used the platform for their fox hunts and race meetings.

In 1889, the Victorian Railways traffic manager recommended the construction of a second platform, because of the number of people who had to cross the tracks. For example, during a medical congress in January 1889, over 800 people had to do so. There was also the problem of having to work the system as a single line between Sunbury and the only platform. The cost of the second platform was debited to maintenance rather than Sir William Clarke.

In 1927, Rupertswood mansion was acquired by the Salesian Order who established a boys' boarding school there. From about 1930, an annual Eucharistic Festival was held at the school, with a number of special trains being run, requiring temporary intermediate block posts to be established between St Albans and Sunbury. The last Eucharistic Festival was held in 1980.

In 1940, the second platform was removed. After 1962, the station was used daily by students attending the college. In the early 2000s, the Victorian government's Regional Fast Rail project involved the rebuilding of much of the Bendigo line. Because Rupertswood station only catered for school traffic it was decided to close it, and that occurred in December 2004.
