= Carlsruhe railway station =

Former railway station in Victoria, Australia

Coordinates: 37°18′25″S 144°29′03″E

Carlsruhe
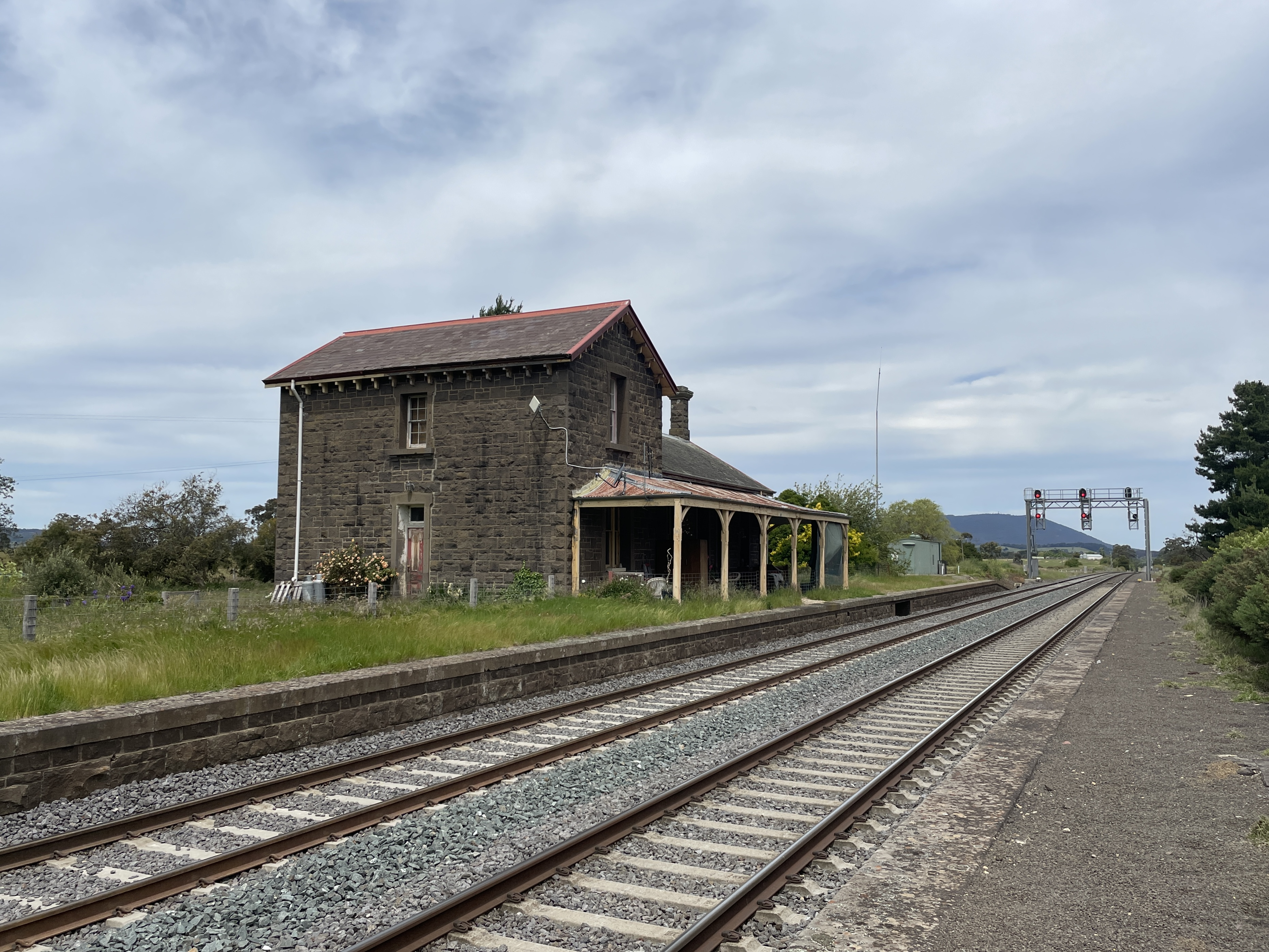
- Former station building in November 2022

General information
- Line: Bendigo
- Platforms: 3
- Tracks: 3

Other information
- Status: Closed

History
- Opened: 1862
- Closed: 1982

Services
Preceding station	Disused railways	Following station
Woodend	Melbourne - Bendigo railway	Kyneton
Junction	Daylesford line	Tylden
	List of closed railway stations in Victoria	
Location

Carlsruhe railway station is a former railway station located in Carlsruhe, Victoria. The station is located on the Bendigo line and closed in 1982 as part of the New Deal for Country Passengers.

== History ==
The station was opened in 1862, and became a junction in 1880 when the first section of the line to Daylesford was opened. The Daylesford line was closed in 1978 and staff withdrawn. The station was one of 35 closed to passenger traffic on 4 October 1981 as part of the New Deal timetable for country passengers. The signal box was abolished in 1980 and the station closed in 1982. The then Victorian Railways decided to demolish the station building as its proximity to a level crossing on the up (Melbourne) end of the platform meant that the building obscured visibility from the crossing to up trains which passed through at high speed. An approach to the then Minister of Transport, Mr Rob McLellan in 1980 by an amateur rail historian, Phil Tagell, convinced him that the relocation of the crossing further South would improve its visibility for motorists wishing to use it and thus allow the building to be saved from demolition. The surviving station building is now used as a private residence.

=== Junction ===
As mentioned Carlsruhe was the junction for one of the lines to Daylesford (the other running from North Creswick) although most trains using this line actually originated in Woodend. The main station building was on the up (to Melbourne) line and an Island platform was used for both the down (to Bendigo) line and the branch line to Daylesford.
