= Kyneton railway station =

Railway station in Victoria, Australia

Kyneton
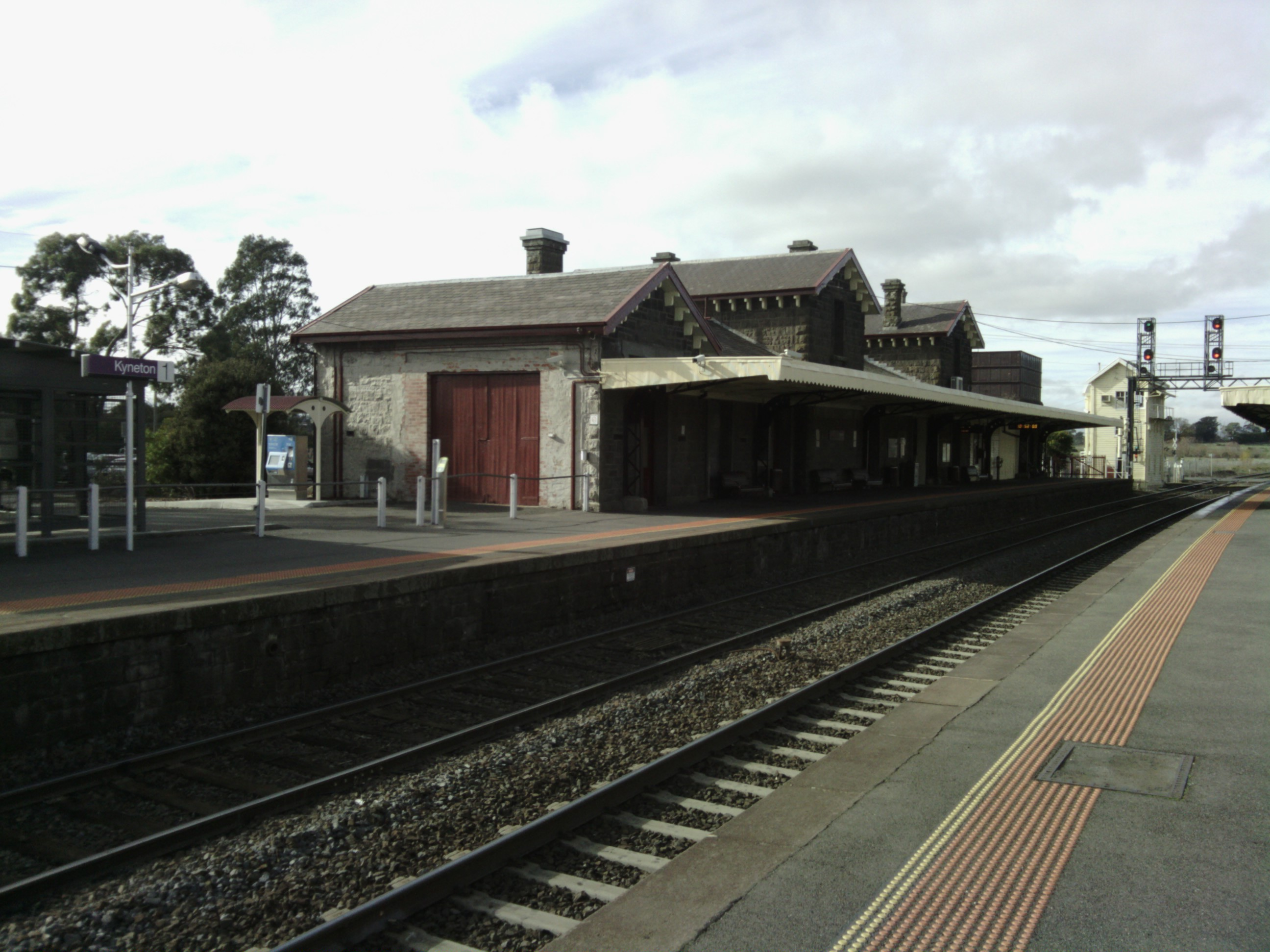
- Eastbound view from Platform 2, May 2013

General information
- Location: 1 Mollison Street, Kyneton, Victoria 3444; Shire of Macedon Ranges; Australia
- Coordinates: 37°15′30″S 144°27′03″E
- System: PTV regional rail station
- Owner: VicTrack
- Operator: V/Line
- Lines: Bendigo Echuca Swan Hill (Deniliquin)
- Distance: 91.55 kilometres from Southern Cross
- Platforms: 2
- Tracks: 2
- Connections: Bus

Construction
- Structure type: At-grade
- Parking: Yes
- Cycle facilities: Available
- Accessible: Yes

Other information
- Status: Operational, staffed
- Station code: KNT
- Fare zone: Myki zone 6/7
- Website: Public Transport Victoria

History
- Opened: 25 April 1862; 164 years ago

Services
Preceding station	V/Line	Following station
Woodend towards Southern Cross	Bendigo line	Malmsbury towards Bendigo, Epsom or Eaglehawk
Woodend towards Southern Cross	Echuca line	Malmsbury towards Echuca
Woodend One-way operation	Swan Hill line 1 weekday & 1 weekend service	Malmsbury towards Swan Hill
Woodend towards Southern Cross	Swan Hill line	Castlemaine towards Swan Hill
Former service
Preceding station	Disused railways	Following station
Carlsruhe	Deniliquin line	Redesdale Junction

Victorian Heritage Register
- Official name: Kyneton Railway Station Complex
- Designated: 20 August 1982
- Reference no.: H1602
Location
- Location within Victoria

Kyneton railway station is a regional railway station operated by V/Line on the Deniliquin and Bendigo lines, part of the Victoria rail network. It serves the north-western suburb and town of Kyneton, in Victoria, Australia. Kyneton is a ground-level unstaffed station, featuring two side platforms. The station opened on 25 April 1862.

The station is served by V/Line Bendigo, Echuca and Swan Hill line trains, with some peak-hour services to and from Melbourne terminating here.

The disused Carlsruhe railway station is located between Kyneton and Woodend. A demolished station was located at Redesdale Junction, between Kyneton and Malmsbury.

== History ==
Between 1977 and 1979, the Kyneton Provender Coy Siding and Watson's Siding were both abolished.

In August 1990, a number of sidings, crossovers, signal posts and the goods shed and goods platform track were all abolished.

The station was upgraded as part of the Regional Fast Rail project in 2005, with the platforms re-aligned, the manual interlocking frame and level crossing gates decommissioned, and remote-controlled computer-based signalling provided. Also as part of the project, the double-track line between Kyneton and Bendigo was singled.

== Platforms and services ==
Kyneton has two side platforms. It is served by V/Line Bendigo, Echuca and Swan Hill line trains. All services to Southern Cross depart from Platform 1, while most services towards and beyond Bendigo depart from Platform 2, although some peak-hour services using Platform 1 instead.

Kyneton platform arrangement
Platform	Line	Destination	Notes	Via	Source
1	Bendigo line Echuca line Swan Hill line	Southern Cross	Services towards Melbourne depart from this platform in the afternoon.	Sunbury	
1	Bendigo line Echuca line Swan Hill line	Bendigo, Echuca	Services towards Bendigo depart from this platform in the morning.	Castlemaine	
2	Bendigo line Echuca line Swan Hill line	Southern Cross	Services towards Melbourne depart from this platform in the morning.	Sunbury	
2	Bendigo line Echuca line Swan Hill line	Bendigo, Epsom, Eaglehawk, Echuca, Swan Hill	Services towards Bendigo depart from this platform in the afternoon.	Castlemaine	

== Transport links ==
Dysons operates four bus routes via Kyneton station, under contract to Public Transport Victoria:

- 1 : to Kyneton Town Centre
- 2 : to Kyneton Town Centre
- 3 : to Kyneton Town Centre
- 4 : Kyneton – Trentham

== Gallery ==
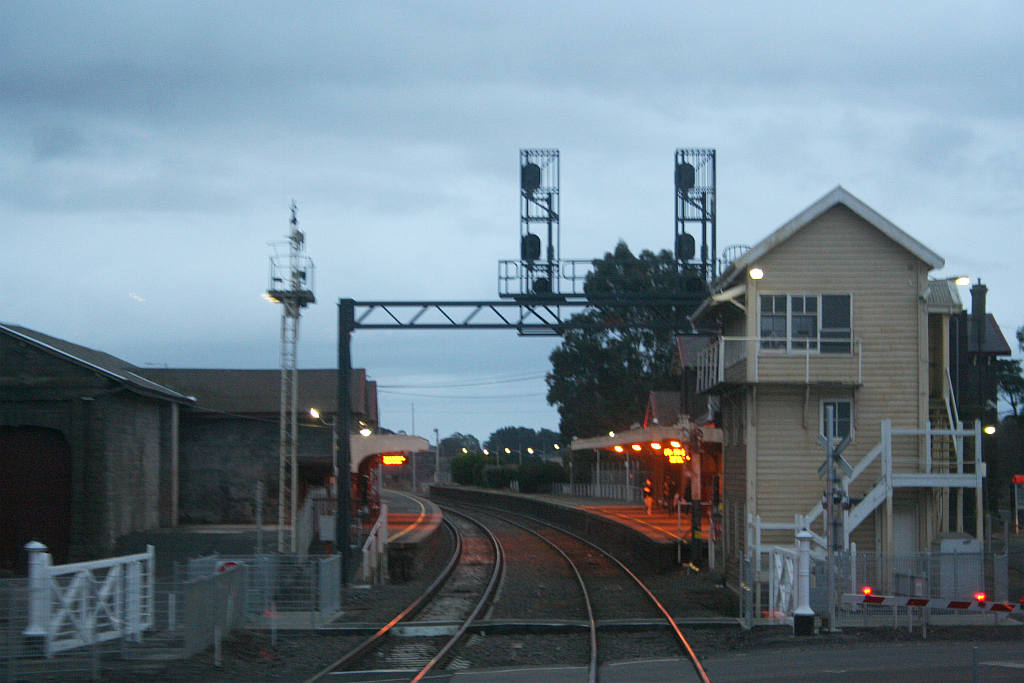
Westbound view from the Mollison Street level crossing looking at signal box, station buildings and platforms, June 2006
