= Sunbury railway station, Melbourne =

Railway station in Melbourne, Australia

Sunbury
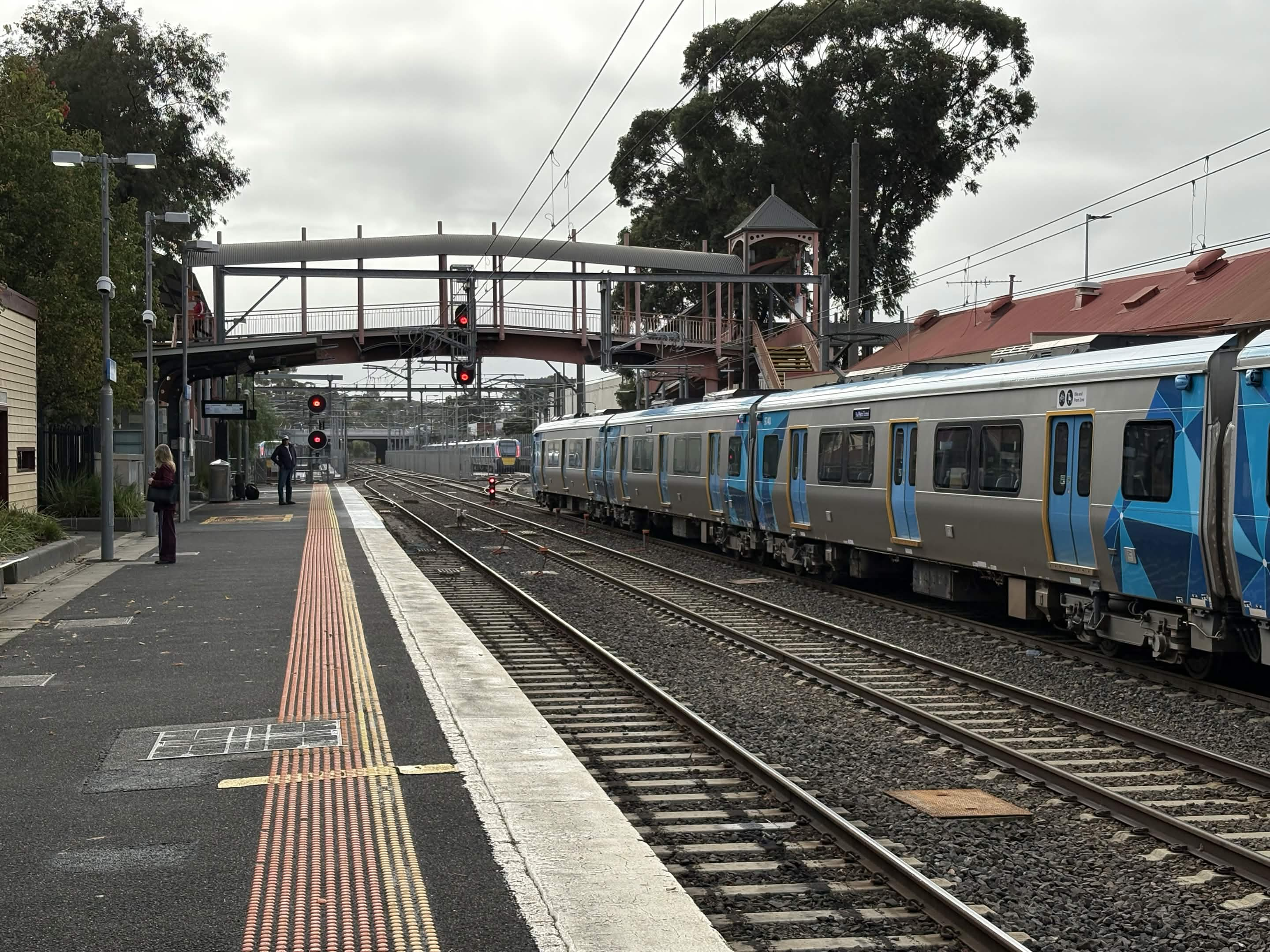
- Northbound view from Platform 2, May 2026

General information
- Location: Brook Street, Sunbury, Victoria 3429; City of Hume; Australia
- Coordinates: 37°34′45″S 144°43′40″E
- System: PTV commuter rail station
- Owner: VicTrack
- Operator: Metro Trains
- Lines: Sunbury; Bendigo Echuca (Deniliquin)
- Distance: 40.28 kilometres from Southern Cross
- Platforms: 2 side
- Tracks: 3
- Connections: Bus

Construction
- Structure type: Ground
- Parking: 300+
- Cycle facilities: Yes
- Accessible: Yes—step free access

Other information
- Status: Operational, premium station
- Station code: SUY
- Fare zone: Myki zone 2
- Website: Public Transport Victoria

History
- Opened: 10 February 1859; 167 years ago
- Rebuilt: 18 November 2012
- Electrified: August 2012 (1500 V DC overhead)

Passengers
- 2005–2006: 467,498
- 2006–2007: 492,785 ▲5.4%
- 2007–2008: 510,361 ▲3.56%
- 2008–2009: 521,417 ▲2.16%
- 2009–2010: 532,474 ▲2.12%
- 2010–2011: 558,667 ▲4.91%
- 2011–2012: 541,704 ▼3.03%
- 2012–2013: Not measured
- 2013–2014: 622,138 ▲14.84%
- 2014–2015: 697,538 ▲12.11%
- 2015–2016: 764,481 ▲9.59%
- 2016–2017: 694,561 ▼9.14%
- 2017–2018: 796,357 ▲14.65%
- 2018–2019: 803,333 ▲0.87%
- 2019–2020: 628,800 ▼21.72%
- 2020–2021: 301,950 ▼51.98%
- 2021–2022: 362,700 ▲20.11%

Services
Preceding station	Metro Trains	Following station
Diggers Rest towards Cranbourne or East Pakenham via Metro Tunnel	Sunbury line	Terminus
V/Line services
Preceding station	V/Line	Following station
Watergardens Limited weekday peak services towards Southern Cross	Bendigo line	Clarkefield towards Bendigo, Epsom or Eaglehawk
Footscray towards Southern Cross	Echuca line	Clarkefield towards Echuca
Track layout
Location

Sunbury station is a railway station operated by Metro Trains Melbourne and V/Line on the Sunbury line and the Bendigo and Echuca regional lines, which are part of the Melbourne and Victorian rail networks. It opened on 10 February 1859, with the current station being provided in 2012.

The station is the terminus of the suburban Sunbury line and is a stop on the Echuca line. The closed Rupertswood station was located between Sunbury and Clarkefield.

== History ==
Sunbury station opened as a terminus, with the railway line not extended further for two years. The three-track yard dates from that time, and was unique in Victoria. There was a large goods shed on the southern side, a large silo on the northern side, and sheep and cattle yards with stock loading ramps. There was also housing for railway staff, including two houses in Horne Street, and the stationmaster's house in Brook Street, which were all demolished in the 1980s.

Until 1981, proper interlocking of the signals and point work did not exist, and the station was not fully interlocked until 1998, when Solid State Interlocking was provided. On 16 April 2005, that interlocking was abolished, as part of the Regional Fast Rail project.

In late 1993, the station was refurbished, with upgrades included an enclosed booking lobby, an air-conditioned waiting room, the repainting of the station buildings, and landscaping of the garden area around the station. In 2005, as part of the Regional Fast Rail project, the layout of the station was again altered.

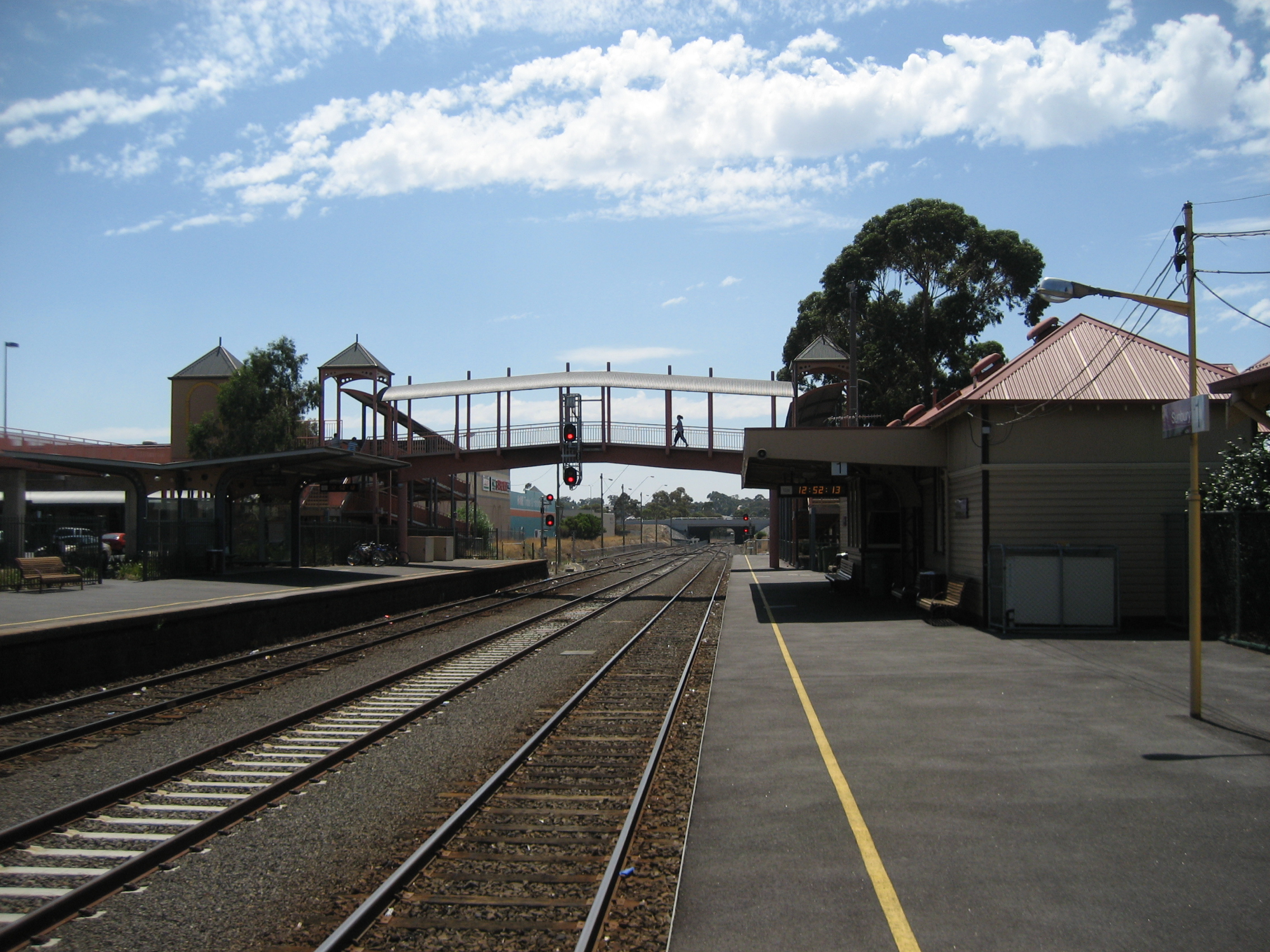
The station prior to electrification and upgrades.

On 18 November 2012, Sunbury station was added to the metropolitan network, when the line from Watergardens was electrified. The station was also upgraded as part of those works. Electrification of the line to Sunbury had first been proposed in the 1970s, along with a new station along the Sunbury bank north of the Jackson Creek bridge, to serve the Goonawarra housing estate. However, after a drop in population estimates, that idea was abandoned.

In 1940, flashing-light warning signals were provided at the former Gap Road level crossing, which was located at the up end of the station, with boom barriers provided in 1983. In 2005, the level crossing was modified as part of the Regional Fast Rail project and, in 2012, was modified again, as part of the electrification of the line to Sunbury. On 30 November 2018, the Level Crossing Removal Project announced that the level crossing would be grade separated, with the road passing underneath the railway line. The project was brought forward from 2025, and was completed in September 2022.

== Platforms and services ==
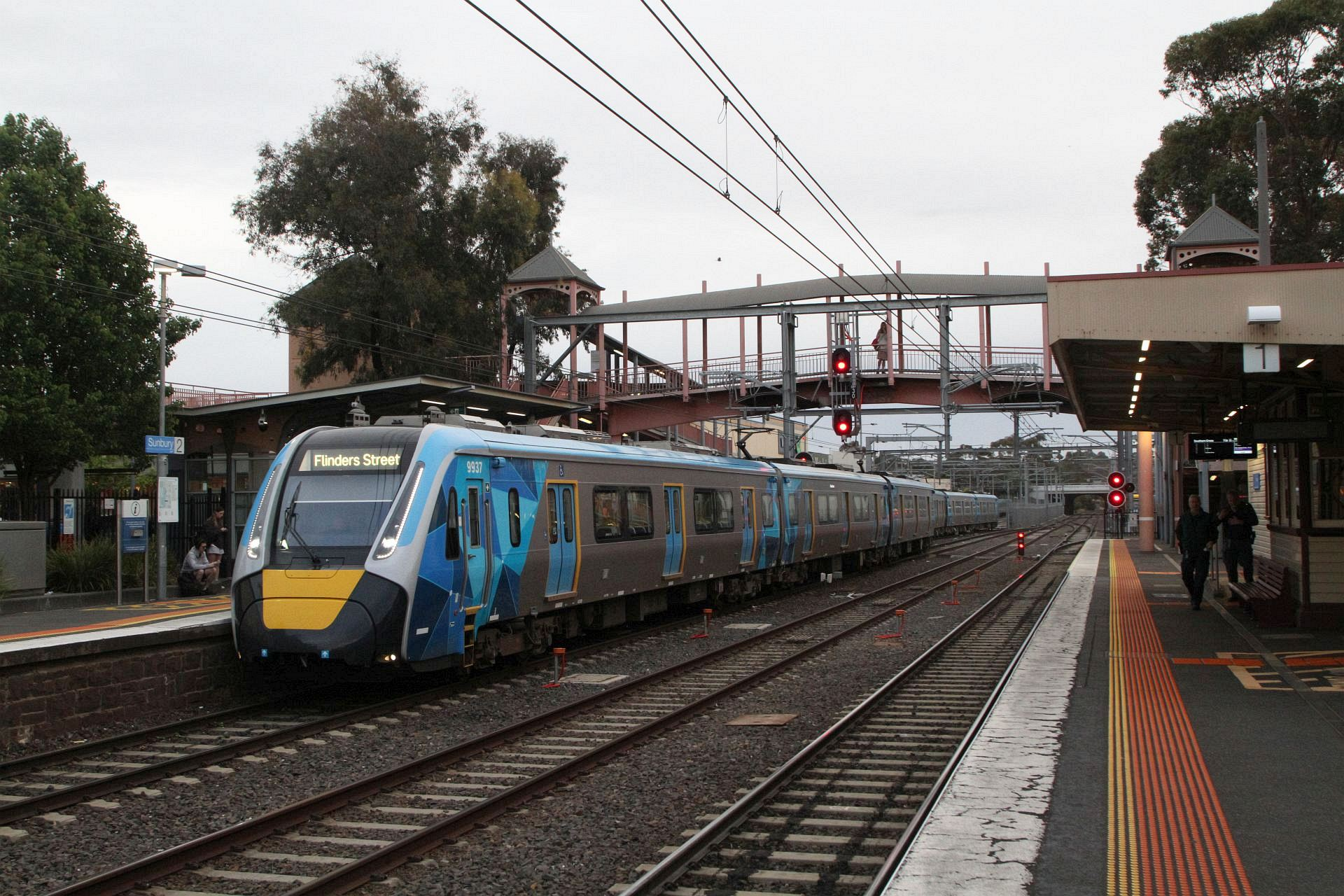
A High Capacity Metro Train leaving a siding to commence a Flinders Street-bound service, October 2023

Sunbury has two side platforms and is served by Sunbury line trains, as well as V/Line Bendigo and Echuca line trains.

=== Metropolitan ===
Sunbury platform arrangement
Platform	Line	Destination	Via	Service pattern	Notes	Source
1	Sunbury line	Westall, Dandenong, East Pakenham, Cranbourne	Town Hall	Limited express services	Services to Westall and Dandenong only operate during weekday peaks.	
2	Sunbury line	Westall, Dandenong, East Pakenham, Cranbourne	Town Hall	Limited express services	Services to Westall and Dandenong only operate during weekday peaks.	

=== Regional ===
Sunbury platform arrangement
Platform	Line	Destination	Service pattern
1	Bendigo line Echuca line	Southern Cross; Bendigo; Echuca	All stations and limited express services
2	Bendigo line Echuca line	Southern Cross; Bendigo; Echuca	All stations and limited express services

== Transport links ==
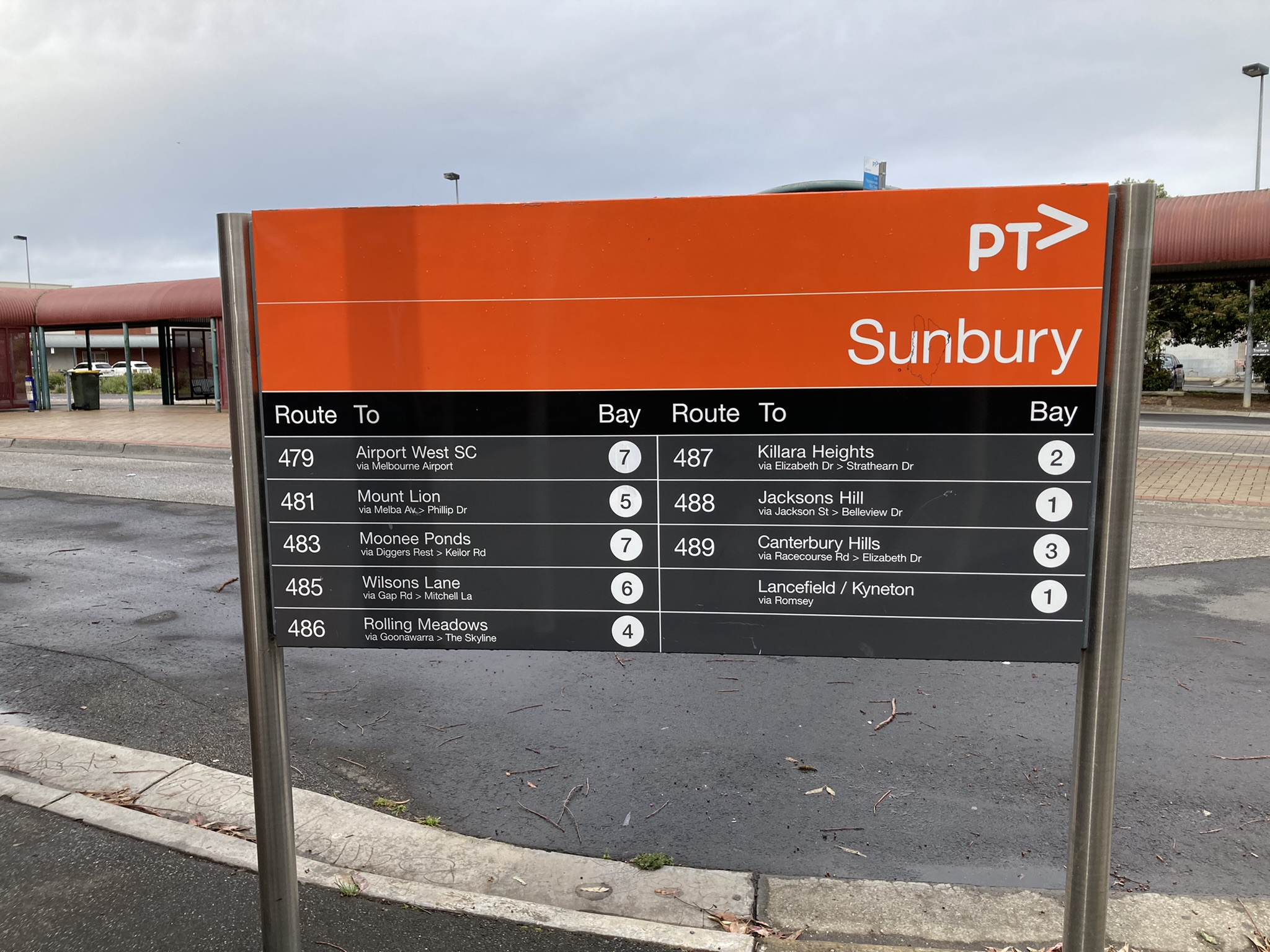
Bus bay interchange signage, November 2022

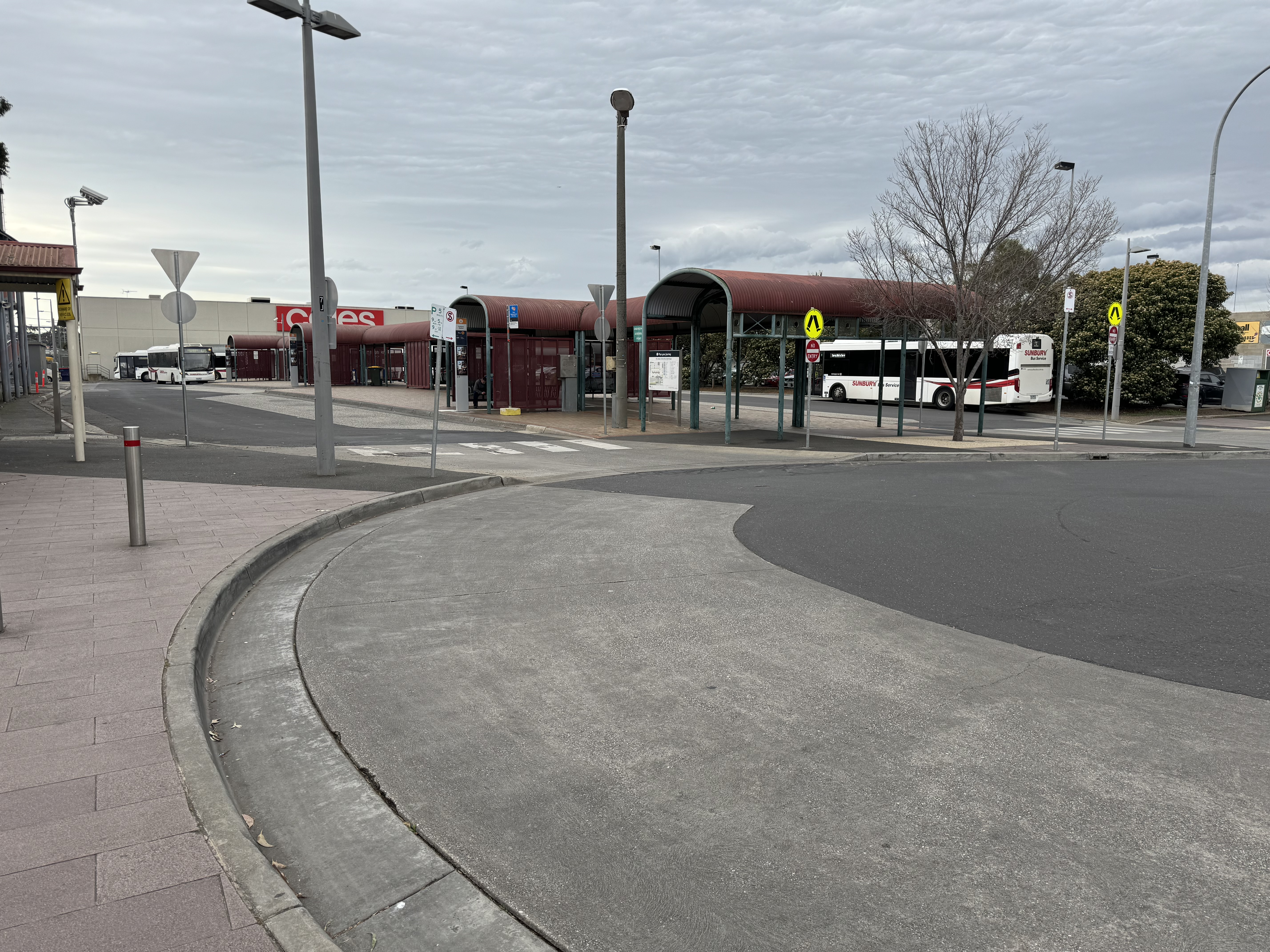
The bus interchange area at the eastern concourse, September 2024

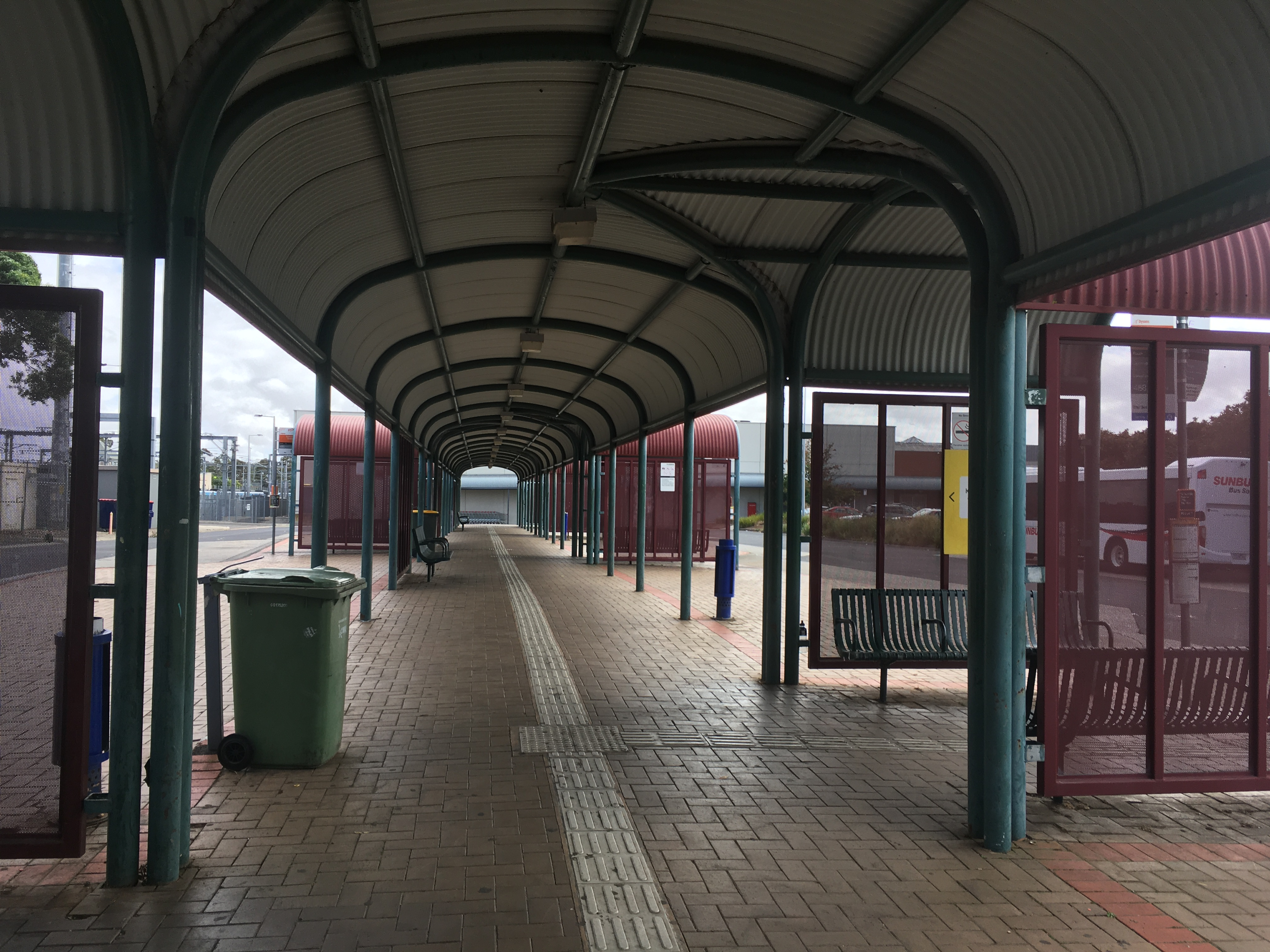
The undercover area at the bus interchange, December 2020

CDC Melbourne operates one bus route to and from Sunbury station, under contract to Public Transport Victoria:

- 479 : to Westfield Airport West

Dysons operates one bus route to and from Sunbury station, under contract to Public Transport Victoria:

- to Lancefield

Sunbury Bus Service operates eight routes to and from Sunbury station, under contract to Public Transport Victoria:

- 481 : to Mount Lion
- 483 : to Moonee Ponds Junction
- 485 : to Wilsons Lane
- 486 : to Rolling Meadows
- 487 : to Killara Heights
- 488 : to Jacksons Hill
- 489 : to Canterbury Hills
- 475 : to Diggers Rest station
