= Epsom railway station, Victoria =

Railway station in Victoria, Australia

Epsom
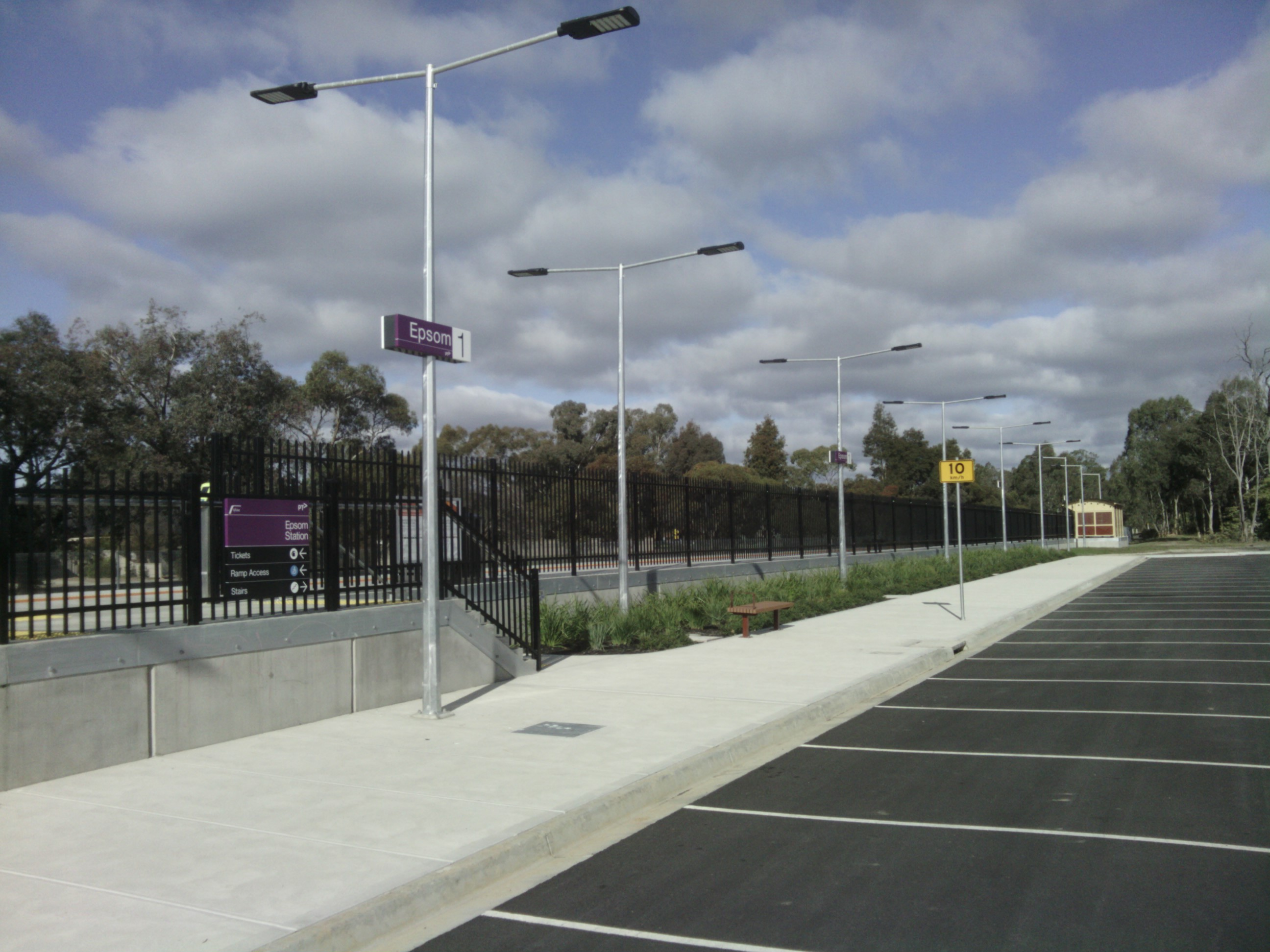
- Station carpark and entrance, June 2015

General information
- Location: Station Street, Epsom, Victoria 3551; City of Greater Bendigo; Australia
- Coordinates: 36°42′27″S 144°19′15″E
- System: PTV regional rail station
- Owner: VicTrack
- Operator: V/Line
- Lines: Bendigo Echuca (Deniliquin)
- Distance: 169.74 kilometres from Southern Cross
- Platforms: 1
- Tracks: 1
- Connections: Bus

Construction
- Structure type: At-grade
- Parking: Yes
- Cycle facilities: Yes
- Accessible: Yes

Other information
- Status: Operational, unstaffed
- Station code: EPM
- Fare zone: Myki zone 13
- Website: Public Transport Victoria

History
- Opened: 19 September 1864
- Closed: 16 March 1970
- Rebuilt: 12 October 2014; 11 years ago
- Former names: Epsom and Huntly (1864-1882); Epsom Siding (1882-1889)

Services
Bendigo line: Three weekday services to Southern Cross.
Echuca line: Three in both directions on weekdays, two on weekends.
Preceding station	V/Line	Following station
Bendigo towards Southern Cross	Bendigo line Weekdays only	Terminus
Bendigo towards Southern Cross	Echuca line	Huntly towards Echuca
Former service
Preceding station	Disused railways	Following station
Huntly	Deniliquin line	Line open
Location
- Location within Victoria

Epsom railway station is located on the Deniliquin line in Victoria, Australia. It serves the northern suburb Epsom in Bendigo, Victoria, Australia, and opened on 12 October 2014.

The original Epsom station opened on 19 September 1864 as Epsom and Huntly. It was renamed Epsom Siding on 22 May 1882, and was renamed Epsom on 1 October 1889. On 26 October 1903, it opened for passengers, and it closed on 16 March 1970, with the platform removed by 24 November of that year.

In April 2014, the Victorian Government announced that a new Epsom station would be constructed. It is serviced six times on weekdays, by extending some services that formerly terminated at Bendigo.

== Platforms and services ==
Epsom has one platform. It is serviced by terminating V/Line Bendigo line services from Southern Cross, and through Echuca line services between Echuca and Southern Cross.

Epsom platform arrangement
Platform	Line	Destination
1	Echuca line	Southern Cross, Echuca

== Transport links ==
Christian's Bus Company operates two routes via Epsom station, under contract to Public Transport Victoria:

- 5 : Huntly – Kangaroo Flat
- 50 : to Bendigo station
