= Regional Fast Rail project =

Former project in Victoria, Australia

The Regional Fast Rail project (or RFR project) was a rail transport project undertaken by the State Government of Victoria, Australia, between 2000 and 2006 aimed at improving rail services on the Victorian regional railway network (operated by V/Line), specifically to reduce travel times, enhance service frequency and safety.

With delays, the project was finally completed in 2009. Record passenger numbers and a substantial contribution to the growth of regional Victorian economies have both been attributed to the project with several substantial spin-off projects and subsequent calls for further upgrades and investment. The cost of the project to the government was estimated at A$750 million.

== History ==
=== Background and 1999 state election ===
At the 1996 Victorian election, a Liberal Party government led by Jeff Kennett was re-elected on a platform of continued rationalisation of the state's public services. This program of service reduction and privatisation, later described as one of the Kennett government's most significant legacies, included breaking up the Public Transport Corporation and selling or franchising nearly all of its assets and operations, as well as cancelling or reducing train services to regional areas. During 1999, the state's V/Line rail freight operations were sold outright to Freight Victoria, a consortium led by American company RailAmerica. At the company's insistence, the government also decided to lease the majority of the intrastate network itself to the winning bidder, on the basis that the control of both track and trains would enable Freight Victoria to implement greater efficiencies. However, open access was mandated for the network under Freight Victoria's control, for other freight operators and passenger services. Later in the year, country passenger train operations under the V/Line brand were franchised to National Express, a British transport multinational, under a 15-year contract which included a commitment by the company to invest in infrastructure upgrades as well as 58 "high speed trains".

In the lead up to the 1999 election, it became imperative for the Labor Party under Steve Bracks to focus on country towns most affected by the cuts to services over the previous decade, as the Liberal government appeared to be a strong chance for re-election in the suburbs of Melbourne.

On 8 September, in addition to promising a Melbourne Airport rail link, Bracks announced a new commitment to invest $80 million in the Geelong, Ballarat, Bendigo and Traralgon country rail lines, enabling new private infrastructure manager Freight Victoria to increase speed limits from 80 km/h (50 mph) to 130 km/h (81 mph) and therefore reduce travel times to main regional centres. The following day, the government promised $100,000 in funding to investigate the possibility of upgrading the Ballarat line alone.

By the beginning of October, Bracks had indicated that he expected private rail operators would be heavily involved in the project, and promised to begin discussions by the end of that year should he be elected.

The election of 18 September 1999, resulted in a hung parliament with both major parties attempting to secure a deal with three independent representatives in order to form government. Having secured a deal, the Bracks government was elected on 16 October, shocking political commentators and election analysts, who had expected Kennett to comfortably retain power for a third term.

=== Planning and pre-construction ===
In accordance with his pre-election promise, Bracks announced in December 1999 that feasibility studies and community consultation were underway and would be completed by the following April. At the same time, the government's travel time targets began to emerge, with the promise of 60- and 80-minute journeys to Ballarat and Bendigo respectively met with lukewarm support from city councils.

In early 2000, Bracks committed the government to a major redevelopment of Spencer Street station, the main Melbourne country rail terminal, to bring it up to modern standards in line with the fast rail project and proposed airport link. Then, in March, the government announced that the findings of the feasibility studies supported commencement of the project, and suggested that the upgrades could be completed within four years.

On 5 September of that year, the government revealed full details of the Regional Fast Rail plan for the first time. Announcing that the government's contribution would be $550 million instead of the originally promised $80 million, Bracks told media that the government had not fully understood the decrepitude of the existing network, and that while the government's payments would cover the costs of upgrading infrastructure, the private sector would fund the purchase of new rollingstock for the improved lines. The announcement also detailed that the maximum speed of the improved services would be 160 km/h (99 mph), enabling travel times of 45 minutes to Geelong and 90 minutes to Traralgon in addition to the previously mooted targets for Ballarat and Bendigo.

At the start of October, the government's ability to work with the still-new private operators of the transport system was called into question when Freight Australia (FA) – a renamed Freight Victoria, lessor of the country rail network infrastructure – threatened to withdraw its cooperation if the government continued to insist that it provide equitable access to other freight operators on the network. The company's argument, that the proposed pricing arrangement did not adequately reimburse FA for capital investment in the network, was supported by academics from Melbourne Business School. As an alternative, FA offered to take on accountability and project management of the RFR program in exchange for alterations to the open access scheme, an arrangement which it argued would minimise the risk to the government and encourage the private sector to invest additional funds in the project. However, the government rejected this approach, pointing out that the term of the rail network lease enabled the state to proceed with upgrade works regardless of FA's willingness to cooperate, and arguing that FA had access to the details of the proposed open access regime at the time it purchased the V/Line Freight business. In response, FA suspended further capital investment in the state's rail network, but ultimately did not rule out cooperating with the fast rail scheme.

By the end of March 2001, the Liberal state opposition had begun to claim that there was little private sector interest in the project, and that the government would be forced to contribute its full cost should it go ahead. Bracks and transport minister Peter Batchelor denied the rumours, saying that formal expressions of interest would be called later in the year. A launch was held in June, where the government hoped to find investment support, but Bracks and Batchelor conceded they would fully fund the project if no additional finance could be found. Meanwhile, the government agreed to assist National Express with its purchase of new trains, as the government had demanded they be built to faster specifications than the original franchise documents envisaged. Later that month, the government suggested that the fibre optic cabling required to upgrade signalling could encourage internet service providers to join the project in order to offer connectivity to towns along the upgraded lines.

A shortlist of consortiums bidding to construct the project was announced in September. The leading companies for the five bids – Alstom, Baulderstone, John Holland, Leighton Contractors and Downer EDI Rail – agreed to attempt to meet the government's target travel times, investigate electrifying the line to Geelong as part of the project, and finalise the requirements for property acquisition and additional costs. A separate tender was let in October for the fibre-optic cabling, with three bidders shortlisted.

Bombardier Transportation was contracted as the builder of the new fast trains in late November. The VLocity trains, with a top speed of 210 km/h, were to be constructed at Bombardier's Dandenong factory at a cost of $410 million, including a 30-year maintenance agreement. Meanwhile, the government suffered sustained criticism of the project following the release of research commissioned by the National Party and carried out by ACIL Consulting, which claimed that the economic benefits of fast rail had been massively overestimated. However, the government denied the report's findings, and the Liberal Party refused to support the Nationals' stark opposition to the project, though it agreed the episode showed the plan had not been sufficiently scrutinised.

== Project scope ==
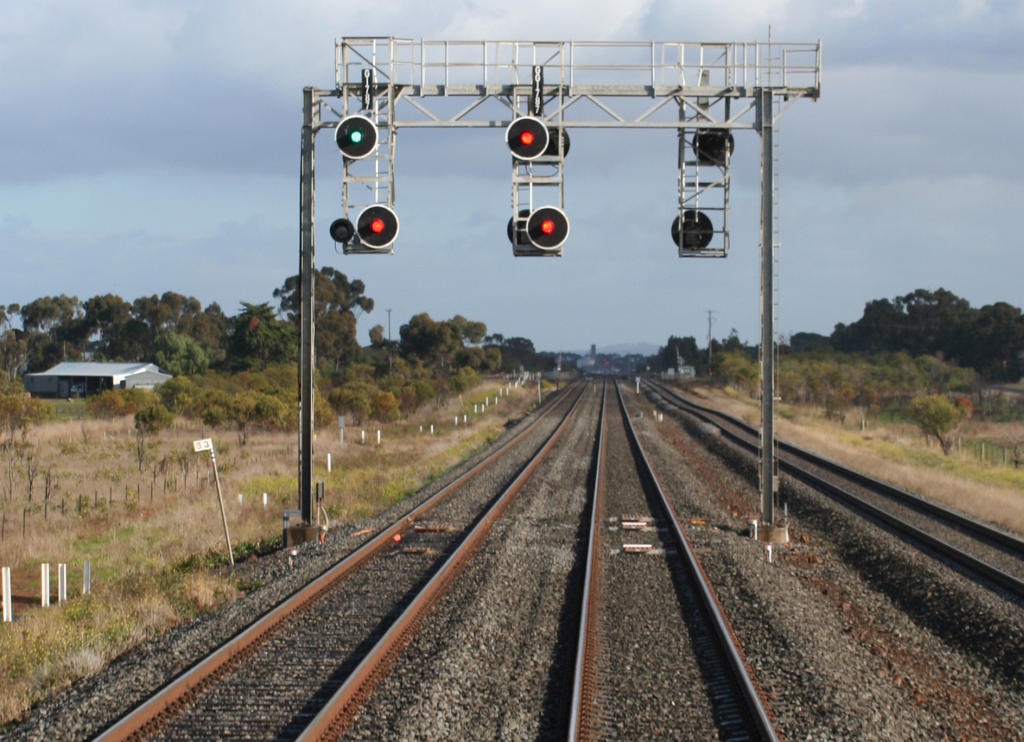
Modern LED railway signals at Lara, Victoria

Because the state government's agencies did not have sufficient resources or experience to successfully procure a major rail project, the Department of Infrastructure chose to offer bidding consortia substantial freedom to submit a scope of works that would meet the government's objectives. In order to do this, the tenders for each of the four routes to be upgraded were offered separately, and civil engineering firms were encouraged to bid in partnership with signalling providers.

The state's objectives included improving journey times "to the maximum extent possible on a value-for-money basis", maintaining a suitable standard of safety, achieving sustained patronage growth, minimising cost to the taxpayer and transferring risk to the private sector, and meeting ambitious deadlines for completion. Tendering firms were asked to design their bids to serve two peak services and one counter-peak on each of the Ballarat, Bendigo and Gippsland corridors.

The project had five key components:

- upgrading rail infrastructure: construction works were undertaken to upgrade rail infrastructure to allow trains to travel safely at speeds of up to 160 km/h on the country sections of the corridors
- new fast trains: a total of 29 new VLocity trains were purchased
- installation of fibre optic cable: a new fibre optic cable network was installed as part of the upgraded rail signalling and communications systems
- new timetable: a revised 2006 V/Line timetable was developed, incorporating some faster and several additional train services
- interconnecting bus services: improvements to connecting bus services to the fast rail regional centres.

The delivery of these objectives entailed upgrading 500 km of rail lines from the track bed up, installing 400 new and upgraded railway signals, installing more than 460,000 concrete sleepers, upgrading 170 level crossings, introducing new rail safety systems (later including the Train Protection & Warning System), developing new train timetables with improved services, and the laying of new fibre optic cable along the rail corridors to allow for better signalling and also provide enhanced broadband facilities in regional area The VLocity trains began running at increased speeds from December 2005, with regular 160 km/h services beginning on the Geelong, Ballarat, and Bendigo lines on 3 September 2006.

As well as reduced journey times, new timetables also increased the frequency of services, with off-peak trains arriving up to once per hour. Additional trains, with varying lengths to suit demand, were scheduled to operate during the peak, with one service on each line in the morning and evening peaks designated as the "flagship" service, which was scheduled to run at the journey time which had been promised.

=== Ballarat line ===
Ballarat was the first line to see V/Line's new VLocity in service on 22 December 2005.

Track and signalling were upgraded to allow VLocity trains to run at 160 km/h between Deer Park West Junction and Ballarat. In addition, some deviations were built to ease curves and, in one case, to provide a considerably shorter route (the original route was retained, however, to provide a passing loop).

=== Geelong line ===
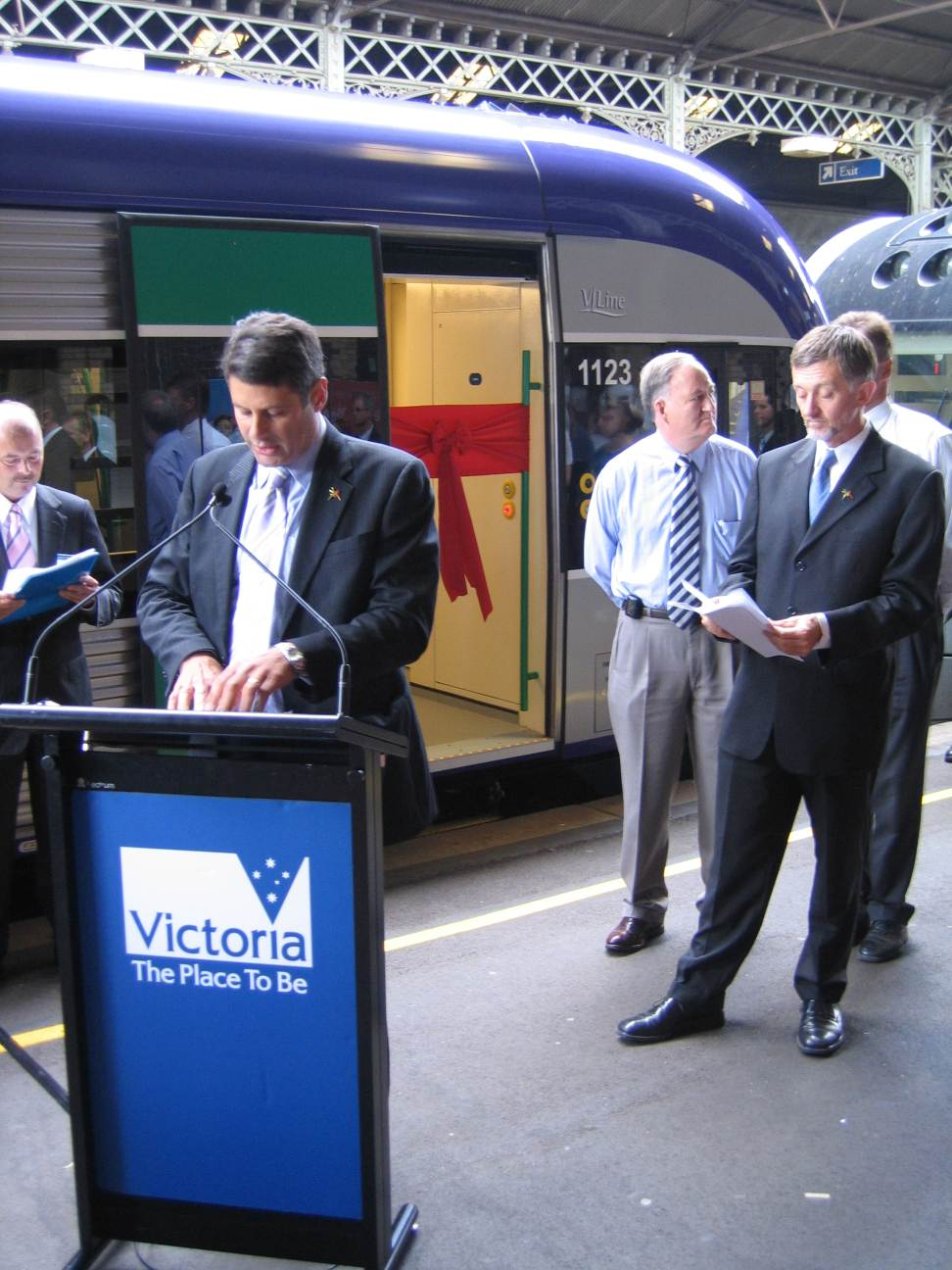
Launch of the Geelong line upgrades by Victorian Premier Steve Bracks and Transport minister Peter Batchelor in February 2006

Fast Rail services were officially launched on the Geelong line on 3 February 2006.

The double-track Geelong line had the track and signalling upgraded to allow VLocity trains to run at 160 km/h between Werribee and Geelong. These works were carried out in various stages between 2004 and 2006. The Geelong line already comprised two bi-directional tracks between Newport and North Geelong. 160 km/h operation is only provided for on the East track for down trains and the West track for up trains.

=== Bendigo line ===
Track and signalling was upgraded on the Bendigo line to allow VLocity trains to run at 160 km/h between Sunbury and Bendigo. Bidirectional signalling was provided between Sunbury and Kyneton. Between Kyneton and Bendigo the double-track line was singled to allow for better clearances past heritage structures, although retaining some sections of double track to form long crossing loops. The crossing loops were provided with bidirectional signalling, but only one of the two tracks was upgraded for 160 km/h running.

=== Traralgon line ===
Track and signalling on the Traralgon line was upgraded to allow VLocity trains to run at 160 km/h between Pakenham and Traralgon. Bidirectional signalling was provided on the double-track sections between Pakenham and Bunyip, and between Longwarry and Moe. 160 km/h services began on 15 October 2006, although a few selected services ran to slightly faster schedules for a week or so beforehand. However, only the former up track (now called the South track) was upgraded for 160 km/h running; VLocity trains are limited to 130 km/h on the former down track (now North track).

== Analysis and reception ==
Despite being described as "the most ambitious reworking of country passenger train services not just in Victoria's but in Australia's history", the RFR project was widely and consistently criticised throughout the development, implementation and service introduction stages, with media, transport experts and Opposition politicians attacking governance failures, cost blowouts, and the project's failure to achieve its original headline promises in any meaningful way. Public reception was initially lukewarm, and broader service benefits – that is, beyond the geographical extent of the project and its "flagship" express services – did not immediately materialise due to the project's limitations.

However, in the years following completion of the RFR project, patronage on V/Line services began to increase at an unprecedented rate, stimulating continued investment in rollingstock and infrastructure. Consequently, a decade after the project's completion, the RFR program had been identified as the beginning of a radical transformation of the role and nature of regional rail services in Victoria.

=== Costs ===
The Government originally hoped that most of the cost of the project would be borne by the private sector with a taxpayer investment of A$80 million. However, when this support failed to materialise, the Government decided to pay for the entire A$550 million project. In addition, the project ran overtime and over budget with the eventual cost estimated at A$750 million.

=== Time savings ===
The original promise was for trains to run to Geelong in 45 minutes, Ballarat in 60 minutes, Bendigo in 80 minutes, and Traralgon in 90 minutes. However, this was soon changed to add four minutes to each journey. In the 2007 V/Line timetables, it takes the Traralgon service 111 minutes to the city.

However, even these times were only for a few trains each day that would run express between Melbourne and the respective regional cities. Furthermore, the number of trains that would run to these schedules was cut to one each way each day. Even though most journey times are now faster than before the project, the public impression is that time savings are minimal.

By 2011, successive timetable changes had drastically slowed services. The Ballarat line alone at least 10 minutes has been added to the average journey following the decision to remove "flagship" express services by the Baillieu Ministry.

As at January 2021, an express service between Traralgon and Southern Cross Station has a journey time of 135 minutes.

=== Bendigo line singling ===
Although the early plans were altered to allow for longer crossing loops on the single track sections, the removal of one of the existing two tracks from much of the Bendigo line reduced its capacity and timekeeping of train services. The resulting delays were added to by delays affecting trains on the metropolitan section of the line between Watergardens and Southern Cross (Melbourne) stations. The installation of broad gauge sleepers, rather than gauge-convertible sleepers which would allow later conversion to standard gauge, was also the source of criticism.

A spokesman for the Better Rail Action Group has claimed that the reason for eliminating the double track was to save maintenance costs, rather than for technical reasons.

=== Broadband access ===
The promised spin-off, broadband access to communities such as Ballan and VLine commuters, did not eventuate due to the government's unwillingness to fund breakout points.

A further criticism is the lack of provision for Wi-Fi on the trains themselves for business travellers.

=== Patronage ===
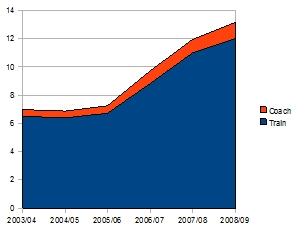
V/Line passenger figures (in million passenger trips) illustrating the dramatic effect on passenger numbers of Regional Fast Rail Project roll out

Despite some initial setbacks, by 2009 the project was being hailed as an unexpected success, spurring record passenger numbers and substantially contributing to the growth of regional Victorian economies.

== Legacy ==
In the years following the completion of the RFR program, a number of further large-scale investments in the regional rail network were proposed and completed. Some of these projects are directly attributable to the problems of the patronage growth which resulted from the RFR upgrades; others focus on similar aims to those of the original project, such as improving travel times and reliability.

=== Additional VLocity purchases ===
Further orders for VLocity trains were placed regularly following the completion of the RFR. Additionally, from 2008, intermediate carriages were ordered, creating a fleet of 3-car sets in place of the original 2-car trains. As of 2025, a total of 423 carriages in 141 sets are in service or on order, compared to the original order of 76 carriages in 38 sets.

=== Regional Rail Link ===
Another legacy of the Regional Fast Rail project is the A$4 billion Regional Rail Link project which aims to separate regional trains on the Geelong, Ballarat, and Bendigo lines from suburban rail movements in the Melbourne metropolitan area. This is designed to increase the reliability and frequency of trains to and from Melbourne on the regional rail network.

=== Passenger Information Display Systems ===
In 2015 a project was completed to provide realtime Passenger Information Display Systems (PIDS) to 33 stations in the RFR service area. This included the provision of LCD screens on platforms and in waiting rooms, and new public announcement and customer help points (push button information speakers) on platforms. The project was managed by VicTrack, with contract work completed by 4Tel, Axent, and Metromatics. The project was nominated in the Control Systems, Networks, Information Processing and Telecommunications category of the 2016 Engineers Australia (Victoria) Engineering Excellence Awards and received a High Commendation.

== See also ==
- High-speed rail in Australia
- Rail transport in Victoria
- Operation Phoenix, 1950s capital works program
- New Deal for Country Passengers, 1980s operational reforms
- Regional Rail Revival, 2010s capital works program
