= Deniliquin railway line =

Railway in northwest Victoria, Australia

Deniliquin

Overview
- Other names: Bendigo; Echuca
- Status: Operational
- Owner: VicTrack
- Locale: Victoria & New South Wales, Australia
- Termini: Deniliquin; Southern Cross

Service
- Type: Heavy rail
- Services: Ararat; Ballarat; Bendigo; Echuca; Geelong; Sunbury; Swan Hill; Warrnambool
- Operator(s): Passenger: Metro Trains, V/Line; Freight: Pacific National, Qube Holdings, Southern Shorthaul Railroad

History
- Work began: 1854
- Completed: 1876

Technical
- Line length: 324.7 km (201.8 mi)
- Number of tracks: 1 (between Deniliquin and Kyneton); 2 (between Kyneton and Sunshine); 4 (between Sunshine and Southern Cross)
- Track gauge: 1,600 mm (5 ft 3 in)
- Electrification: 1500 V DC overhead between Sunbury and Southern Cross
- Signalling: Train Order Working

The Deniliquin railway line (also known as the Bendigo railway line or the Echuca railway line) is a broad-gauge railway line serving north-western Victoria, Australia. The line runs from the New South Wales town of Deniliquin into Bendigo, before turning south-south-east towards Melbourne, terminating in Docklands near the central business district. It is a major trunk line both for passenger and freight trains, with many lines branching off from it.

== History ==
=== The Company ===
Construction of the line was begun by the Melbourne, Mount Alexander & Murray River Railway Company, which was incorporated in 1852. The first thirteen sections of the line were constructed by contractors Cornish & Bruce, who gained a reputation for trying to reduce costs by taking shortcuts on materials and reducing worker's wages.

The company made almost no progress on the construction of the railway due to an inability to raise sufficient funds, and in 1856 it was purchased by the Victorian Government. Because Isambard Kingdom Brunel was at that time the Inspecting Engineer in Britain for the Victorian Government, some people have claimed that he was responsible for the railway's design. An examination of reports published by the Victorian Parliament has shown that claim to be erroneous. The route and structures were the work of the Victorian Railways Department, under the supervision of Engineer-in-Chief George Darbyshire, and completed under Thomas Higinbotham.

=== Design ===
The line was designed with two broad gauge tracks, high speed alignments cutting through the landscape, substantial bridges and railway stations built of bluestone, and double-headed rail.

=== Timeline of construction ===
Originating from Spencer Street Station, the line reached Sunbury in 1859. On 13 January 1859, the Government Railway from Melbourne to Sunbury was opened.

By 1861 it had reached Woodend and on 8 July 1861 the Sunbury to Woodend section opened.

By 1862 the Woodend to Kyneton section was built. On 25 April 1862 the Woodend to Kyneton section was opened.

Later in 1862, the line had been completed to Castlemaine and to Bendigo. On 7 October the first locomotive reached Bendigo. Another Official Opening was held at Castlemaine on 15 October 1862.

The whole of the Melbourne to Bendigo railway was formally opened at Bendigo on 20 October 1862 by the Governor of Victoria, Sir Henry Barkly.

The railway finally reached Echuca in 1864 and transformed the town into a major river port, with a famous wharf and substantial urban growth in the 1870s. In 1876 the Deniliquin and Moama Railway Company opened its 71 km (44 mi) private railway northwards to Barnes and Deniliquin, and the line at Echuca was extended across the Murray River into Moama to join the railway. This section was taken over by Victorian Railways in 1923, as part of the 1922 Border Railways Act.

=== Decline ===
Passenger rail services from Echuca to Balranald were withdrawn on 7 November 1975, with the last train a 153hp Walker railmotor. The Echuca to Kyabram service was withdrawn on 18 December 1975. The last train was also 153 hp Walker railmotor, the service being provided for school children and paid for by the Education Department. The Bendigo – Echuca – Deniliquin passenger service was withdrawn on 11 January 1979, with the last train being operated by a DERM. Toolamba – Echuca passenger services were withdrawn on 2 March 1981, leaving the town without any rail services.

=== Revival and present day ===
A twice-weekly passenger service from Bendigo to Echuca was reinstated in 1996. The passenger service was replaced with buses on 19 December 2004, pending an upgrade due to poor track condition. The rail service recommenced in late 2006. Since 2007, there is one train to/from Melbourne on weekdays and two on weekends, with the train speed between Bendigo and Echuca limited to 100 km/h because there are a number of unprotected level crossings.

The section between Bendigo and Sunbury was upgraded as part of the Regional Fast Rail project between 2005 and 2006.

The section of the Deniliquin railway line from Echuca to Deniliquin closed on 6 August 2010. The line has again re-opened in 2013 to service the SunRice Factory and Grain Silos.

Epsom railway station, located between Bendigo and Elmore stations, was opened on 12 October 2014. As part of the Regional Rail Revival project, a new station at Goornong opened on 12 December 2021, followed by another station at Huntly on 16 July 2022.

== Branch lines ==
The Lancefield line was opened from Clarkefield (north of Sunbury) to Lancefield in 1881, and extended to Kilmore in 1892 to connect with the Heathcote railway line. This line was completely closed by 1956.

The Daylesford branch line was opened from Carlsruhe (between Woodend and Kyneton) to Daylesford in 1880. In 1887 it was later connected with a line from Ballarat. This Daylesford branch was closed in 1978, but part of it, between Daylesford and Bullarto, is now operated by the Daylesford Spa Country Railway as a heritage railway.

A branch line was built between Redesdale Junction (north of Kyneton) and Redesdale by 1900, but it closed in 1954.

The Maldon line was opened from Castlemaine to Maldon in 1884, and extended as far as Shelbourne in 1891, although it had originally been planned to run to Laanecoorie. The line from Maldon to Shelbourne was closed in 1969 following bush fire damage. The Maldon branch line closed in 1976. The Victorian Goldfields Railway has restored the line between Castlemaine and Maldon and operates trains over that section.

A branch line was built from Bendigo to Heathcote in 1888, which became a cross-country line in 1890 when connected to a line running from Heathcote Junction on the main North East railway line. The Bendigo–Heathcote line closed in 1958 and the Heathcote Junction to Heathcote branch was closed in November 1968.

A branch line was built from Elmore to Cohuna in 1910 and it was closed in the 1980s.

A branch line was built from Barnes to Moulamein and Balranald in 1926. The Moulamein–Balranald section was closed in the 1980s.

=== Piangil line ===
The Piangil line was extended north from Eaglehawk (just north of Bendigo on the line to Inglewood) in 1882, reaching Swan Hill in 1890. It remains in use today.

=== Robinvale line ===
The Robinvale line was opened from Bendigo to Inglewood in 1876, Korong Vale in 1882, Boort in 1883, Quambatook in 1894, Ultima in 1900, Chillingollah in 1909, Manangatang in 1914, Annuello in 1921 and Robinvale in 1924. This line is currently booked out of service.

Under the Border Railways Agreement of 1922, Victorian Railways commenced construction of a railway to Koorakee and Lette in New South Wales in 1924 (the Lette railway line), but this railway was never completed. The Murray River bridge between Robinvale and Euston was instead converted to a road bridge, but it was demolished upon completion of a new road bridge in 2006. However the lift span of the old bridge has been relocated to McGinty Park in Robinvale as part of an historic display. A short branch line was built from Wedderburn Junction (south of Korong Vale) to Wedderburn in the 1880s which closed in the 1980s.

There is currently no passenger service on this line.

=== Kulwin line ===
The Kulwin line was opened from Korong Vale to Wycheproof in 1883, Sea Lake in 1895, Nandaly in 1914, Mittyack in 1919 and Kulwin in 1919.

This line currently only handles grain trains. Until late 2006, rural rail network lessee Pacific National had mothballed the Mittyack to Kulwin section. There has not been passenger service on this line since 1978.

== Features ==
There are substantial wrought iron and masonry viaducts at Sunbury, Malmsbury and Taradale, as well as two tunnels at Elphinstone and Big Hill.

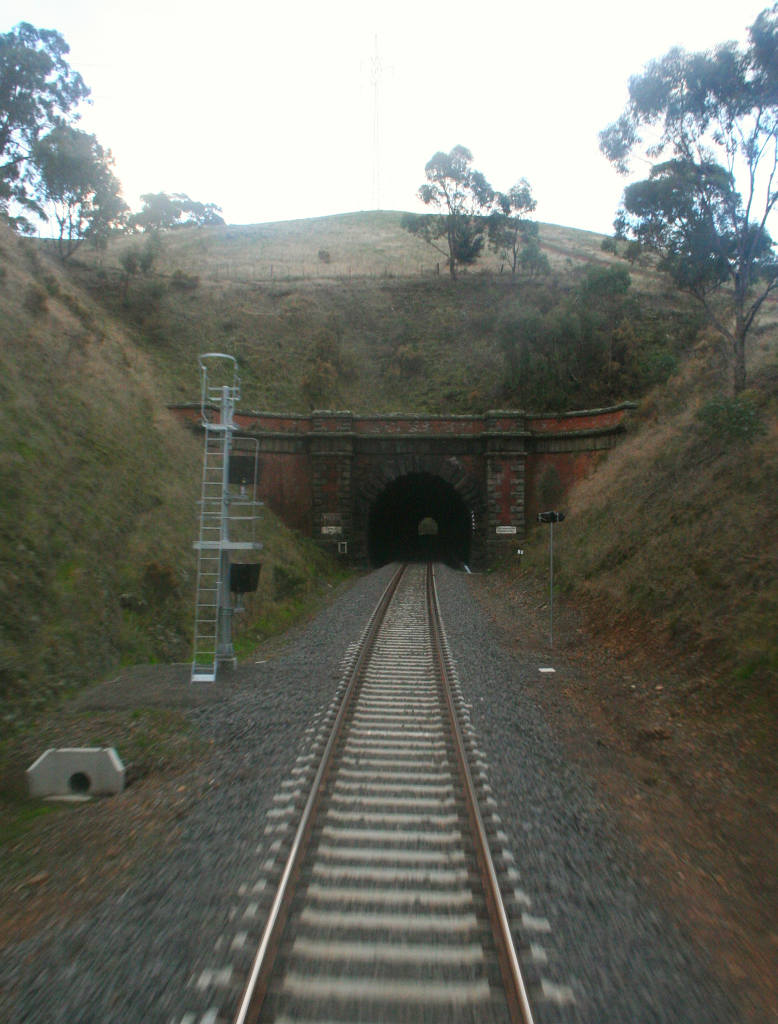
The portal of the Big Hill railway tunnel, 390 metres long

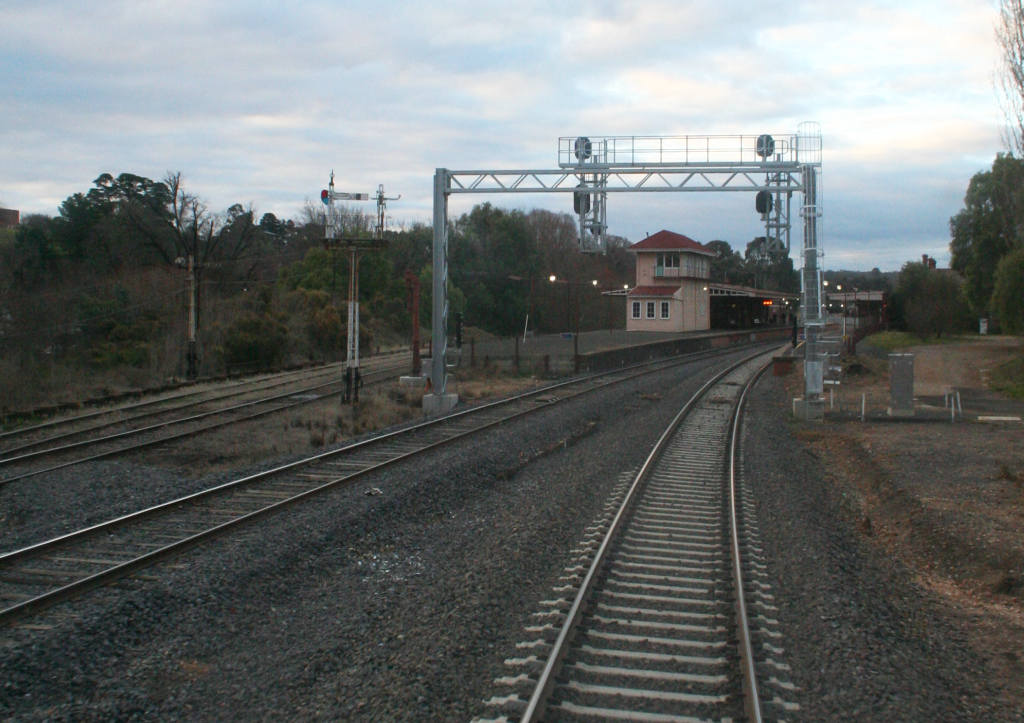
A mix of new and old signalling at Castlemaine station

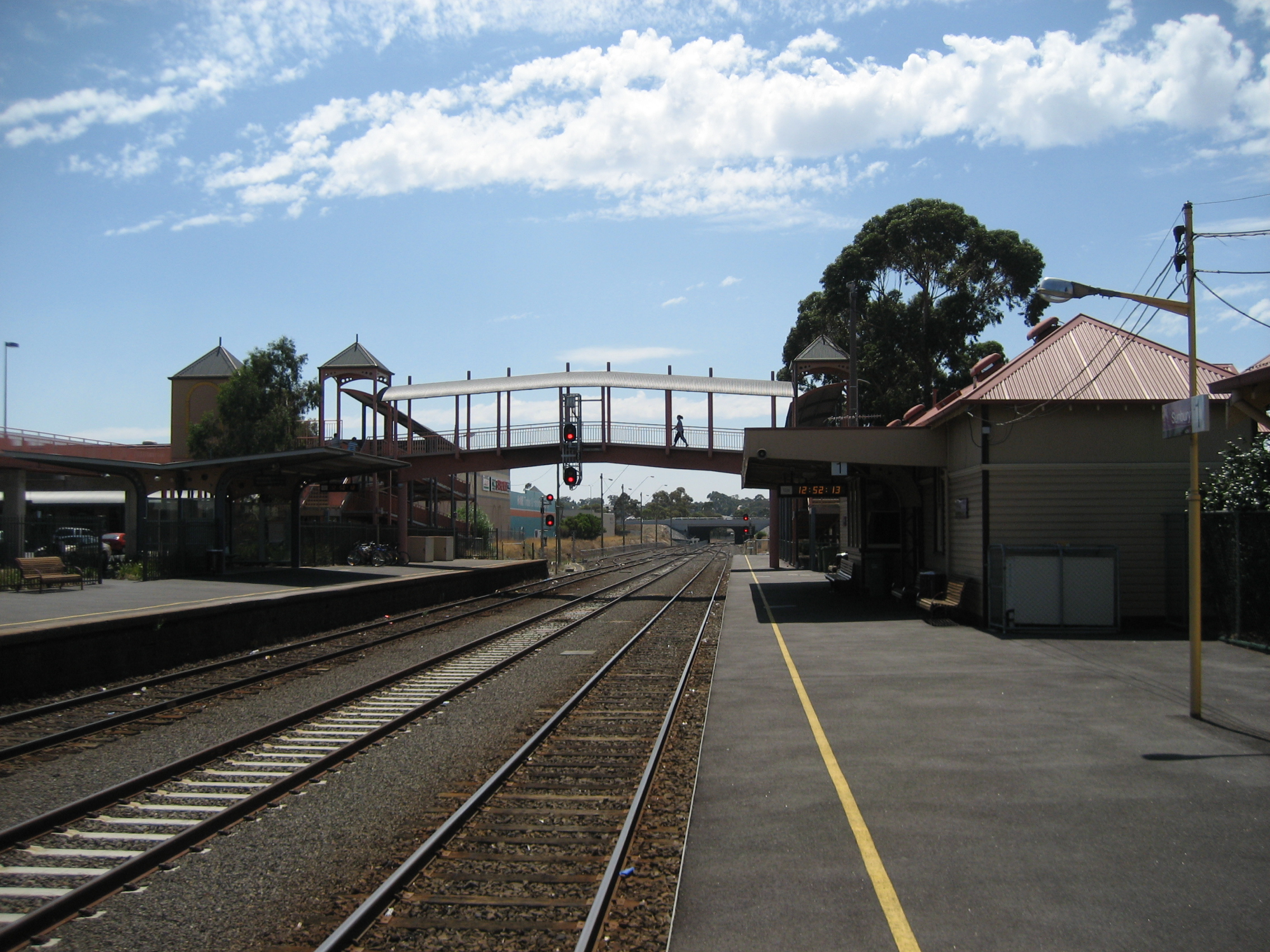
Sunbury Station prior to electrification

== Passenger services ==
The Deniliquin line is used by many regional V/Line services and a commuter Metro Trains service.

Sunbury line commuter services operate on the entire Melbourne section of the line between Sunbury and Southern Cross, where it then enters the City Loop. Regional Bendigo line services operate on the same line between Bendigo (and sometimes Epsom) and Southern Cross. Swan Hill services enter the line at Bendigo from the Piangil line and also run on the same route into Melbourne.

The section of the line between Sunshine and Southern Cross is also used by Ararat, Ballarat, Geelong and Warrnambool services. At Sunshine, these services branch off onto the Serviceton line.

Most V/Line regional passenger trains operate on the second pair of tracks between Sunshine and Southern Cross that were built as part of the Regional Rail Link project, leaving the original pair of tracks for the primary use of the Sunbury commuter rail line.

Three services on weekdays and two services on weekends operate in each direction each day between Echuca and Southern Cross. Outside Melbourne, all services stops at all operating stations between Echuca and Sunbury. The service then runs express to Footscray, then to the terminus at Southern Cross. At Footscray, passengers may not board services to Southern Cross or alight services to Echuca.

== Engineering heritage award ==
The railway line received an Engineering Heritage National Marker from Engineers Australia as part of its Engineering Heritage Recognition Program.
