= Echuca railway station =

Railway station in Victoria, Australia

Echuca
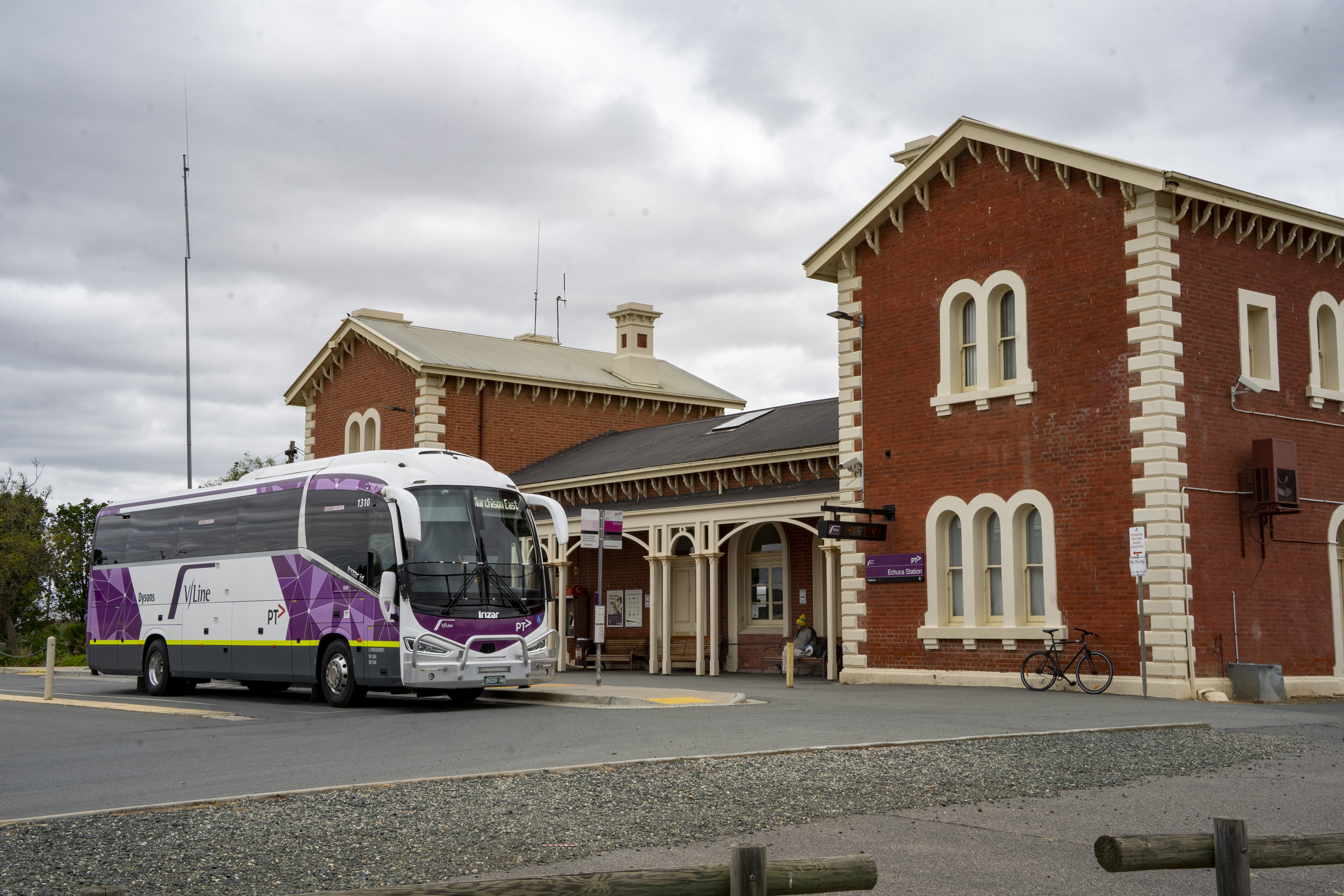
- Echuca Railway Station in November 2025

General information
- Location: 116 Sturt Street, Echuca, Victoria 3564; Shire of Campaspe; Australia
- Coordinates: 36°07′52″S 144°45′12″E
- System: PTV regional rail station
- Owner: VicTrack
- Operator: V/Line
- Lines: Echuca (Deniliquin); Toolamba–Echuca
- Distance: 249.99 kilometres from Southern Cross
- Platforms: 1
- Tracks: 5
- Connections: V/Line coach; NSW TrainLink coach

Construction
- Structure type: At-grade
- Parking: Yes
- Accessible: Yes

Other information
- Status: Operational, staffed part-time
- Station code: ECH
- Fare zone: Myki zone 18
- Website: Public Transport Victoria

History
- Opened: 19 September 1864; 162 years ago

Services
Three per day to Southern Cross.
Trains travelling in the opposite direction terminate here.
Preceding station	V/Line	Following station
Rochester towards Southern Cross	Echuca line	Terminus
Former services
Preceding station	Disused railways	Following station
Moama towards Deniliquin	Deniliquin line	Line open
Terminus	Toolamba–Echuca line	Tongala towards Toolamba

Victorian Heritage Register
- Official name: Echuca Railway Station Complex
- Designated: 20 August 1982
- Reference no.: H1059
Location
- Location within Victoria

Echuca railway station is located on the Deniliquin line in Victoria, Australia. It serves the town of the same name, and opened on 19 September 1864.

It is the northern-most operating passenger railway station on the Deniliquin line, and is the terminus for Echuca line services. It also serves as the terminus of the freight-only Toolamba–Echuca line. The Deniliquin line extends northwards, over the New South Wales state border, and is open for freight traffic. Freight sidings and a silo are located opposite the station.

== History ==
The railway reached Echuca in 1864 and, with the opening of the Echuca Wharf, the town was transformed into a major river port, encouraging substantial urban growth in the 1870s. In 1876, the Deniliquin and Moama Railway Company opened its 71 km (44 mi)-long private railway northwards to Deniliquin.

The brick station building at Echuca was provided with the opening of the line, along with a double-gabled brick goods shed, and a three-road locomotive depot. The station building was expanded in 1877, and a large water tower was erected in the same year (demolished in 1977). An iron footbridge was added in 1880. In June 1974, the former northern waiting room section of the station building was demolished. A concrete rail bridge over the Murray River, to the north of the station, was opened in February 1989, replacing a combined road and rail bridge that had opened in 1878.

A short branch line between Echuca and the port opened with the line, but was closed in 1971. In 2000, $150,000 was provided to fund the reconstruction of the line. By 2002, work was under way, with the cost having increased to $330,000. However, by 2007, the branch was again out of use and was disconnected from the main line.

The branch line from Echuca to Toolamba closed in 2007, but was reopened in October 2013. Services on the line were suspended in January 2020.

== Platforms and services ==
Echuca has one platform and is the terminus for Echuca line trains from Southern Cross station.

Echuca platform arrangement
Platform	Line	Destination
1	Echuca line	Southern Cross

== Transport links ==
Echuca is also served by V/Line road coaches running between Bendigo and Moama, and NSW TrainLink road coaches to Albury and Wagga Wagga.

== Gallery ==
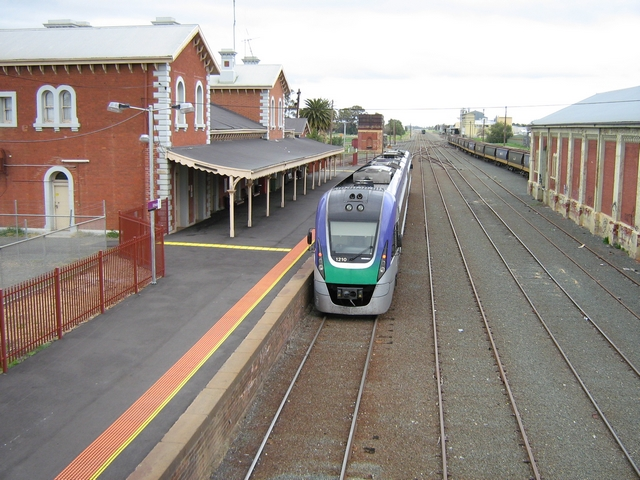
Southbound view of station platform and building with a VLocity train at the platform, August 2007

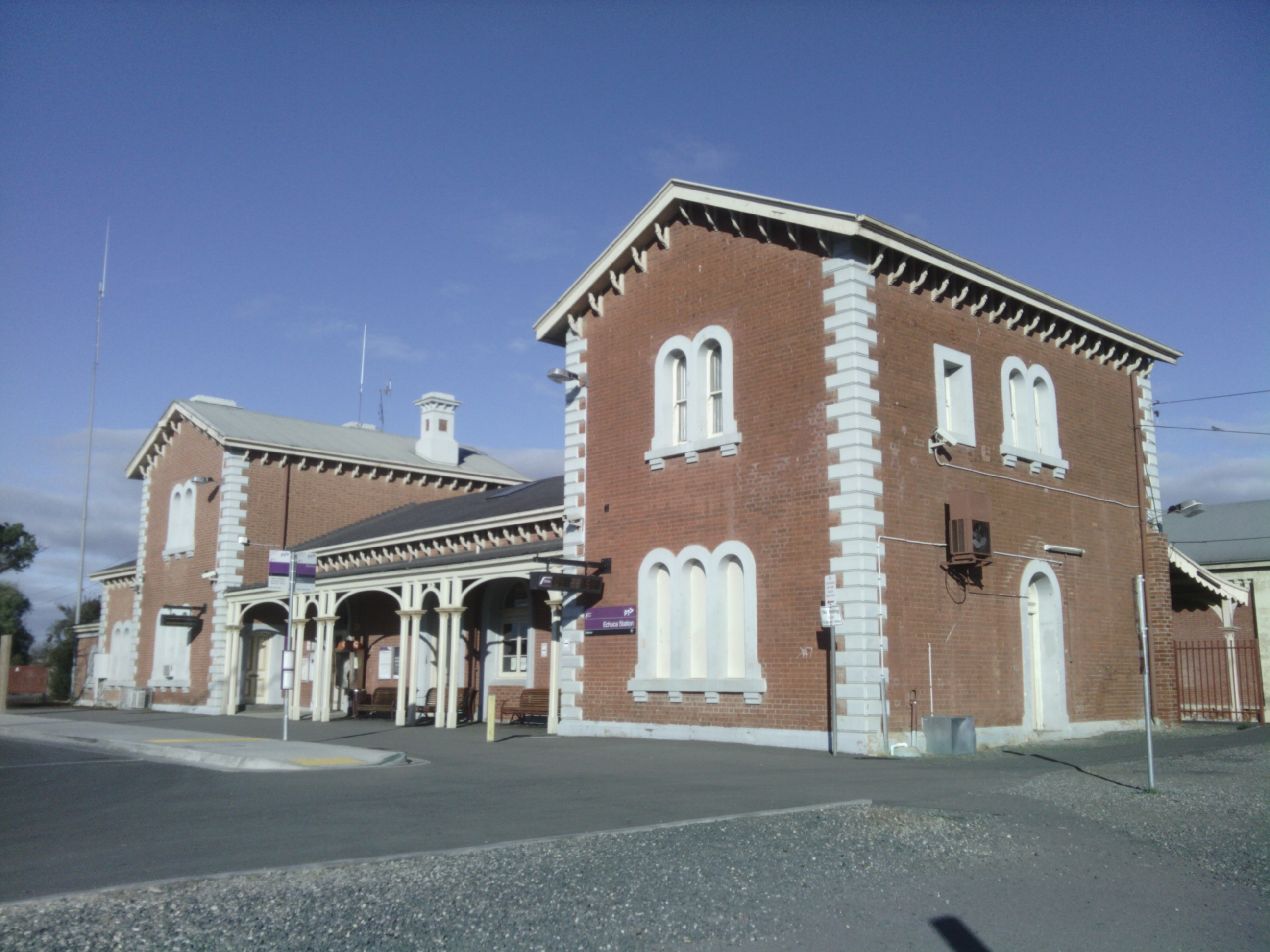
Station building and entrance, June 2015
