= Kangaroo Flat railway station =

Railway station in Victoria, Australia

Kangaroo Flat
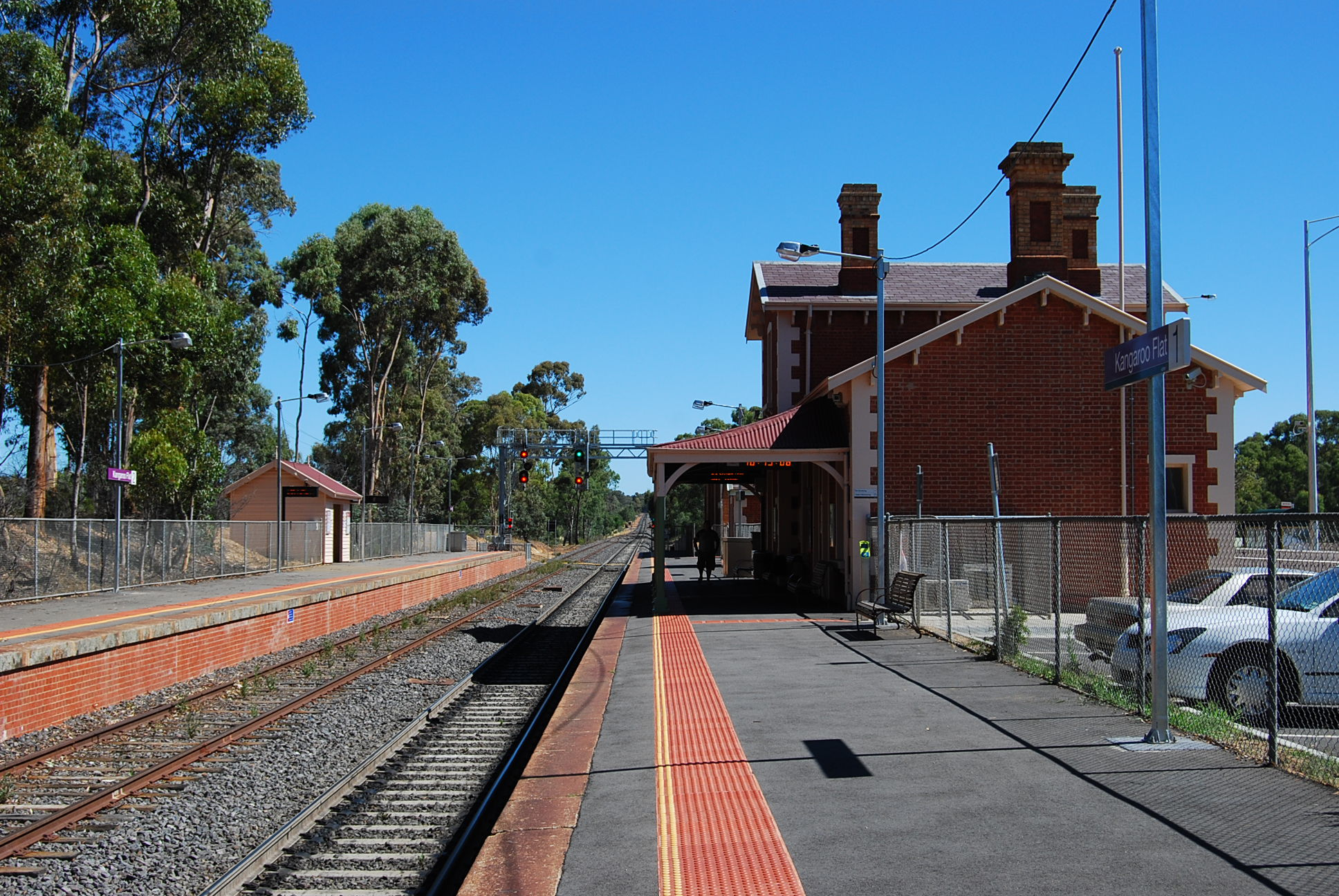
- Southbound view from Platform 1, January 2010

General information
- Location: 2B Short Street, Kangaroo Flat, Victoria 3555; City of Greater Bendigo; Australia
- Coordinates: 36°47′42″S 144°14′55″E
- System: PTV regional rail station
- Owner: VicTrack
- Operator: V/Line
- Lines: Bendigo Echuca Swan Hill (Deniliquin)
- Distance: 157.36 kilometres from Southern Cross
- Platforms: 2
- Tracks: 2
- Connections: Bus

Construction
- Structure type: At-grade
- Parking: Yes
- Cycle facilities: Yes
- Accessible: Yes

Other information
- Status: Operational, staffed part-time
- Station code: KFT
- Fare zone: Myki zone 12/13
- Website: Public Transport Victoria

History
- Opened: 1 February 1874; 152 years ago
- Former names: Kangaroo (9 May 1904–17 July 1916)

Services
Preceding station	V/Line	Following station
Castlemaine towards Southern Cross	Bendigo line	Bendigo Terminus
Castlemaine towards Southern Cross	Bendigo line	Bendigo Weekdays only towards Eaglehawk or Epsom
Castlemaine towards Southern Cross	Echuca line	Bendigo towards Echuca
Castlemaine towards Southern Cross	Swan Hill line	Bendigo towards Swan Hill
Former service
Preceding station	Disused railways	Following station
Ravenswood	Deniliquin line	Golden Square

Victorian Heritage Register
- Official name: Kangaroo Flat Railway Station Complex
- Designated: 20 August 1982
- Reference no.: H1565
Location
- Location within Victoria

Kangaroo Flat railway station is a regional railway station on the Deniliquin line, part of the Victorian railway network. It serves the southern suburb of Kangaroo Flat, in Bendigo, Victoria, Australia. Kangaroo Flat station is a ground level unstaffed station, featuring two side platforms. It opened on 1 February 1874.

Initially opened as Kangaroo Flat, the station was renamed to Kangaroo on 9 May 1904. Then was given its current name of Kangaroo Flat on 17 July 1916, back to its original station name.

== History ==
The contract for the construction of Kangaroo Flat was let in 1862. In 1904, it was renamed Kangaroo, resuming its original identity in 1916. By 1926, facilities included a signal frame, a pair of side platforms on the double track line, a goods siding and shed on the eastern side of the line, and a crossover between tracks. In 1938, the stationmaster was withdrawn, with the station being worked by the porter-in-charge, under "caretaker" conditions.

From 1889, the station was a block point, under the Winters Block system, but it could be "switched out" in times of quieter traffic. That status remained until 1980, when the signal box was only "switched in" when required. In 1987, the signal box was closed, and all points and signals removed.

After a fire in 1990 that caused extensive damage, the station building was left unused, and only two trains per weekday stopped at the station. In 2002, the exterior of the station building and the former goods shed were restored. The Regional Fast Rail project in 2005 saw the line towards Melbourne singled south of the station.

Following a community-led campaign for better services in Bendigo's southern growth corridor, an upgrade of the station was announced in February 2008, involving the construction of a new booking office, a 50-bay car park and bus interchange, and the refurbishment of the waiting room. In January 2014, the platforms were extended, to accommodate longer trains.

Disused stations Ravenswood and Harcourt are located between Kangaroo Flat and Castlemaine, whilst disused station Golden Square is located between Kangaroo Flat and Bendigo.

=== Accidents and incidents ===
On 15 February 2017, V/Line VLocity set VL34 derailed after colliding with a vehicle that had been abandoned on the line near Kangaroo Flat. Two people were taken to hospital.

== Platforms and services ==
Kangaroo Flat has two side platforms. Platform 1 is used by almost all V/Line Bendigo, Echuca and Swan Hill line services travelling in both directions. Platform 2 is used by one Bendigo line service towards Eaglehawk every weekday.

Kangaroo Flat platform arrangement
Platform	Line	Destination	Notes	Via	Source
1	Bendigo line Echuca line Swan Hill line	Southern Cross		Sunbury	
1	Bendigo line Echuca line Swan Hill line	Bendigo, Epsom, Eaglehawk, Echuca, Swan Hill		Bendigo	
2	Bendigo line	Eaglehawk	One weekday service	Bendigo	

== Transport links ==
Christian's Bus Company operates one route via Kangaroo Flat station, under contract to Public Transport Victoria:

- 5 : Huntly – Kangaroo Flat
