= Castlemaine railway station =

Railway station in Victoria, Australia

Castlemaine
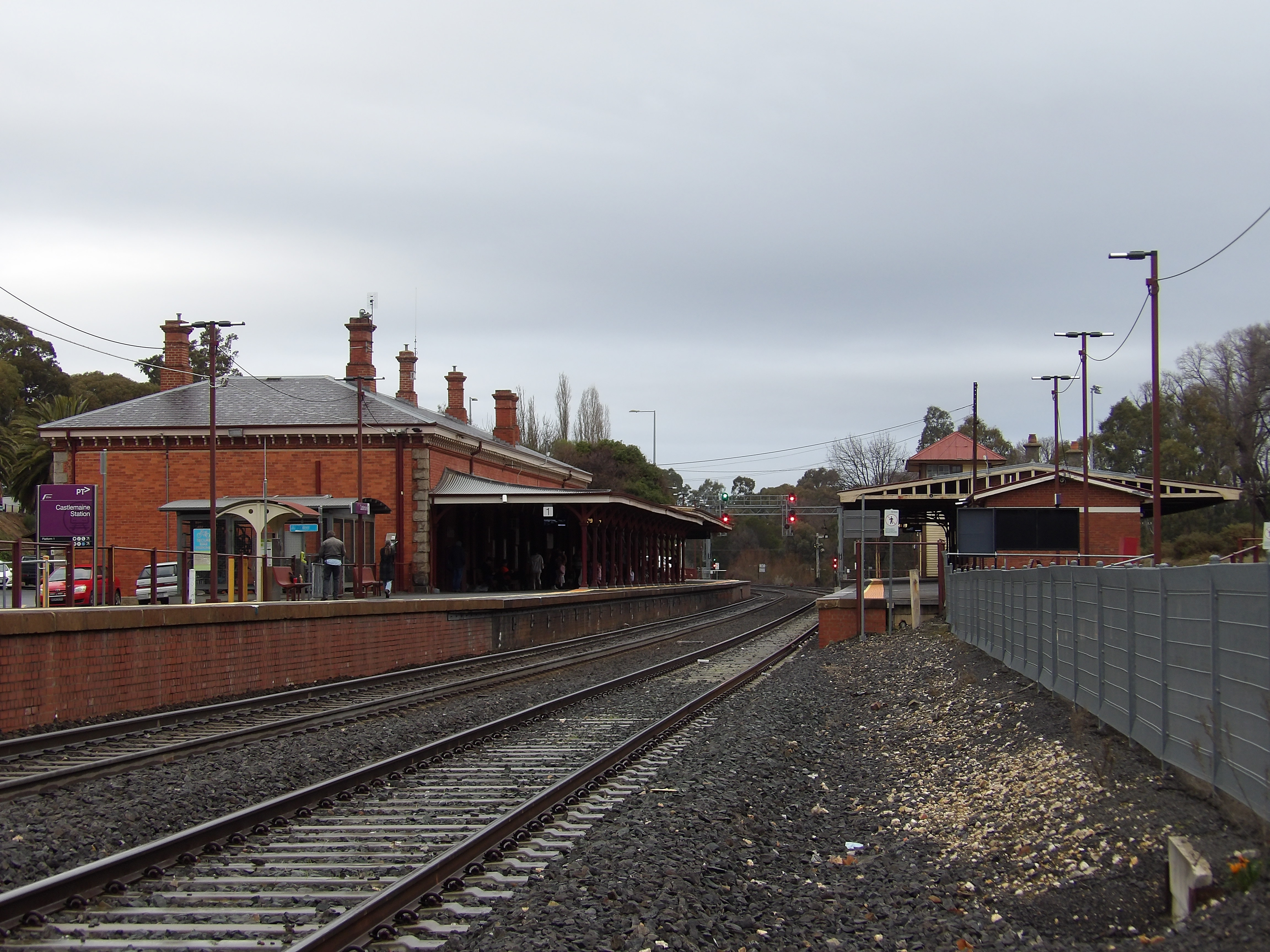
- Southbound view of the station buildings and platforms, July 2025

General information
- Location: Kennedy Street, Castlemaine, Victoria 3450; Shire of Mount Alexander; Australia
- Coordinates: 37°03′47″S 144°12′51″E
- System: PTV regional rail and VGR heritage rail station
- Owner: VicTrack
- Operator: V/Line
- Lines: Bendigo Echuca Swan Hill (Deniliquin); Maldon; Moolort
- Distance: 125.48 kilometres from Southern Cross
- Platforms: 3 (1 island, 1 side)
- Tracks: 3
- Train operators: V/Line; Victorian Goldfields Railway
- Connections: Bus

Construction
- Structure type: At-grade
- Parking: Yes
- Cycle facilities: Yes
- Accessible: Yes

Other information
- Status: Operational, staffed
- Station code: CME
- Fare zone: Myki zone 9/10
- Website: Public Transport Victoria

History
- Opened: 21 October 1862; 164 years ago

Services
Preceding station	V/Line	Following station
Malmsbury towards Southern Cross	Bendigo line	Kangaroo Flat towards Bendigo, Epsom or Eaglehawk
Malmsbury towards Southern Cross	Echuca line	Kangaroo Flat towards Echuca
Malmsbury One-way operation	Swan Hill line 1 weekday & 1 weekend service	Kangaroo Flat towards Swan Hill
Kyneton towards Southern Cross	Swan Hill line	Kangaroo Flat towards Swan Hill
Preceding station	Heritage Railways	Following station
Terminus	Victorian Goldfields Railway	Muckleford towards Maldon
Former services
Preceding station	Disused railways	Following station
Chewton	Deniliquin line	Harcourt
Muckleford towards Maldon	Maldon line	Terminus
Campbell towards Maryborough	Moolort line	Terminus

Victorian Heritage Register
- Official name: Castlemaine Railway Precinct (Murray Valley Railway, Melbourne to Echuca)
- Designated: 20 August 1982
- Reference no.: H1664
Location
- Location within Victoria

Castlemaine railway station is a regional railway station operated by V/Line on the Deniliquin and Bendigo lines, part of the Victoria rail network. It serves the north-western town of Castlemaine, in Victoria, Australia. Castlemaine is a ground-level staffed station, featuring three platforms, one side platform and an island platform with two faces. The station opened on 21 October 1862.

The station is the terminus of the Victorian Goldfields Railway heritage services on the Maldon line. It used to be the terminus of the cross-country Castlemaine-Maryborough railway, but the section from Castlemaine to Moolort was closed in 2004, and the remaining section to Maryborough was closed in 2011.

Disused stations at Elphinstone and Taradale are located between Castlemaine and Malmsbury, while disused stations Harcourt and Ravenswood are located between Castlemaine and Kangaroo Flat. Chewton station, between Castlemaine and Malmsbury, has been demolished.

== History ==
In 1973, the turntable at the station was abolished. On 9 July 1977, the passenger service to Maryborough was withdrawn. In 1978, a number of points were abolished, as was a crossover and the former carriage dock.

Rationalisation of the former yard occurred during the late 1980s. In 1989, signal boxes "A" and "B" were abolished, and replaced with a signal panel within the station office. Mechanical points were also abolished, and all signals were replaced with two and three position signals. Also in that year, boom barriers replaced interlocked gates at the Parker Street level crossing, located nearby in the down direction from the station.

On 17 December 2004, the extension of the Victorian Goldfields Railway from Muckleford to Castlemaine was opened. On 17 January 2005, the signal panel was abolished.

== Platforms and services ==
Castlemaine has one island platform with two faces (Platforms 2 and 3) and one side platform (Platform 1). Platforms 1 and 2 are used by V/Line Bendigo, Echuca and Swan Hill line services in both directions, while Platform 3 is used by Victorian Goldfields Railway heritage services to Maldon.

Castlemaine platform arrangement
Platform	Line	Destination	Notes	Via	Source
1	Bendigo line Echuca line Swan Hill line	Southern Cross		Sunbury	
1	Bendigo line Echuca line Swan Hill line	Bendigo, Epsom, Eaglehawk, Echuca, Swan Hill		Bendigo	
2	Bendigo line Echuca line Swan Hill line	Southern Cross	Crossing loop	Sunbury	
2	Bendigo line Echuca line Swan Hill line	Bendigo, Epsom, Eaglehawk, Echuca, Swan Hill	Crossing loop	Bendigo	
3	Maldon line	Maldon	Victorian Goldfields Railway - heritage railway		

== Transport links ==
Castlemaine Bus Lines operates five routes via Castlemaine station, under contract to Public Transport Victoria:

- 1 : Castlemaine – Campbells Creek
- 2 : Castlemaine Town Loop
- 4 : to Maldon
- 5 : to Taradale
- 6 : to Chewton
