= Golden Square railway station =

Former railway station in Victoria, Australia

Coordinates: 36°46′27″S 144°15′37″E

Golden Square
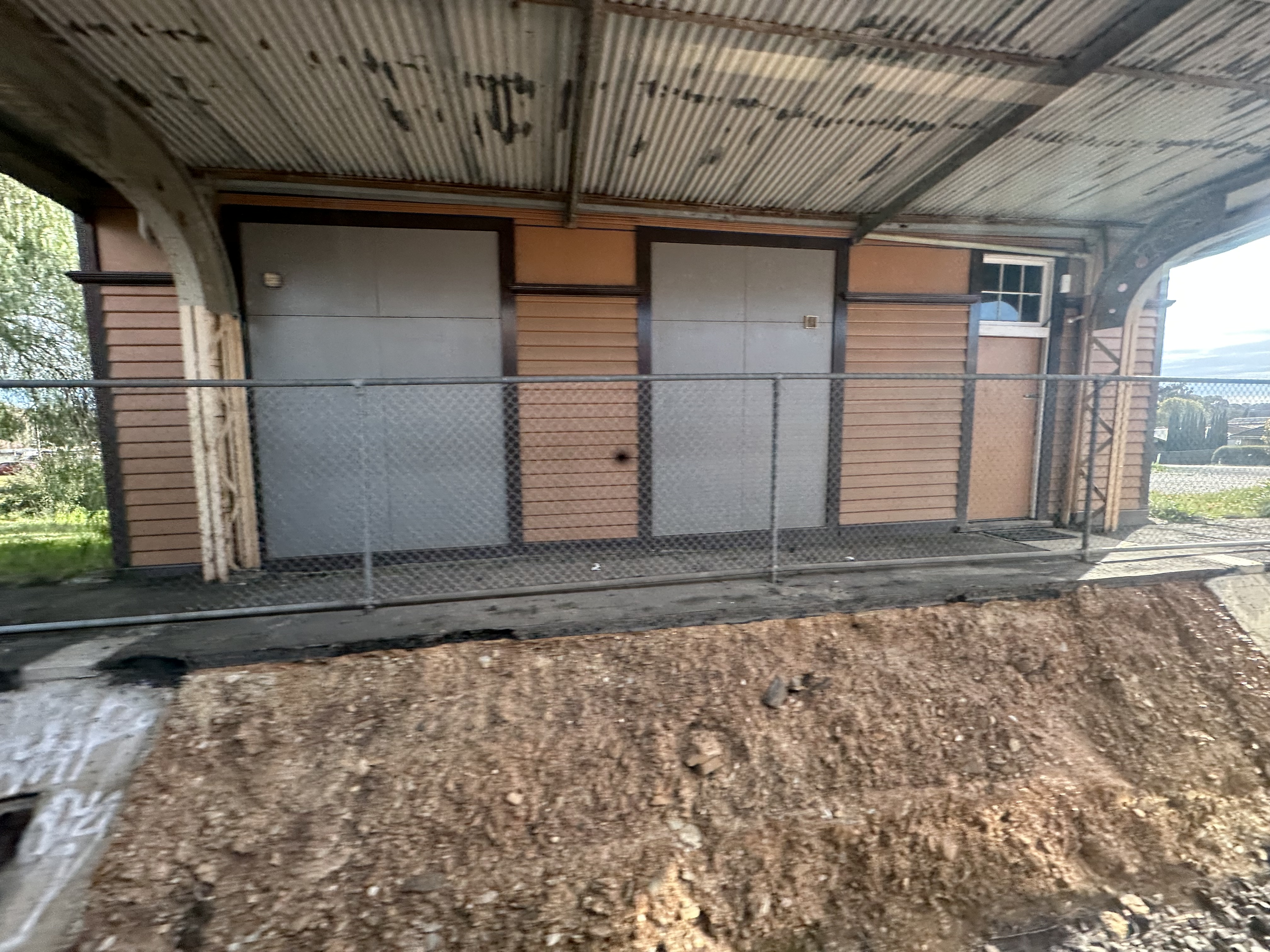
- Former down-side building in August 2026

General information
- Line: Bendigo
- Platforms: 2
- Tracks: 2

Other information
- Status: Closed

History
- Closed: 4 October 1981

Services
Preceding station	V/Line	Following station
Kangaroo Flat towards Spencer Street	Bendigo line	Bendigo Terminus
List of closed railway stations in Victoria
Location

Golden Square railway station was located on the Bendigo line. It served the southern Bendigo suburb of Golden Square. The station closed to passenger traffic on 4 October 1981, as part of the New Deal timetable for country passengers.

In September 1987, the signal box and all signals were abolished, except for one post, and the station was disestablished as a block post. All points were spiked normal, and were removed at a later date.

Since around 1990, the station building Melbourne-bound side has been leased by a community radio station, KLFM, while the smaller down-side building has been leased in the past. In April 2008, renovations were carried out to the down-side building, including re-stumping and the replacement of weatherboards.
