= Harcourt railway station =

Railway station in Victoria, Australia

Coordinates: 37°00′15″S 144°15′11″E

Harcourt

General information
- Line: Bendigo
- Platforms: 2
- Tracks: 2

Other information
- Status: Closed

History
- Closed: 4 October 1981

Services
Preceding station	V/Line	Following station
Castlemaine towards Southern Cross	Bendigo line	Ravenswood towards Bendigo
List of closed railway stations in Victoria
Location

Harcourt is a closed station located on the Bendigo line. It served the township of the same name and was closed to passenger traffic on 4 October 1981, as part of the New Deal timetable for country passengers.

A 10-ton crane at the station, which was used for loading blocks of Harcourt granite quarried at nearby Mount Alexander, was removed in 1973.

Between 1982 and 2006, the station building on the former down platform housed the studios of Goldfields Community Access Radio (3CCC).

== Reopening proposals ==
There has been a campaign to reopen Harcourt station for many years since its closure. In August 2018, the state government announced that it intended to re-open the station if it was re-elected at the 2018 state election.

Despite that, as of 2025 the reopening had not been included in state government plans for upgrading the Bendigo-Echuca line.
