= Maldon railway station =

Railway station in Victoria, Australia

Coordinates: 36°59′32″S 144°4′26″E

Maldon
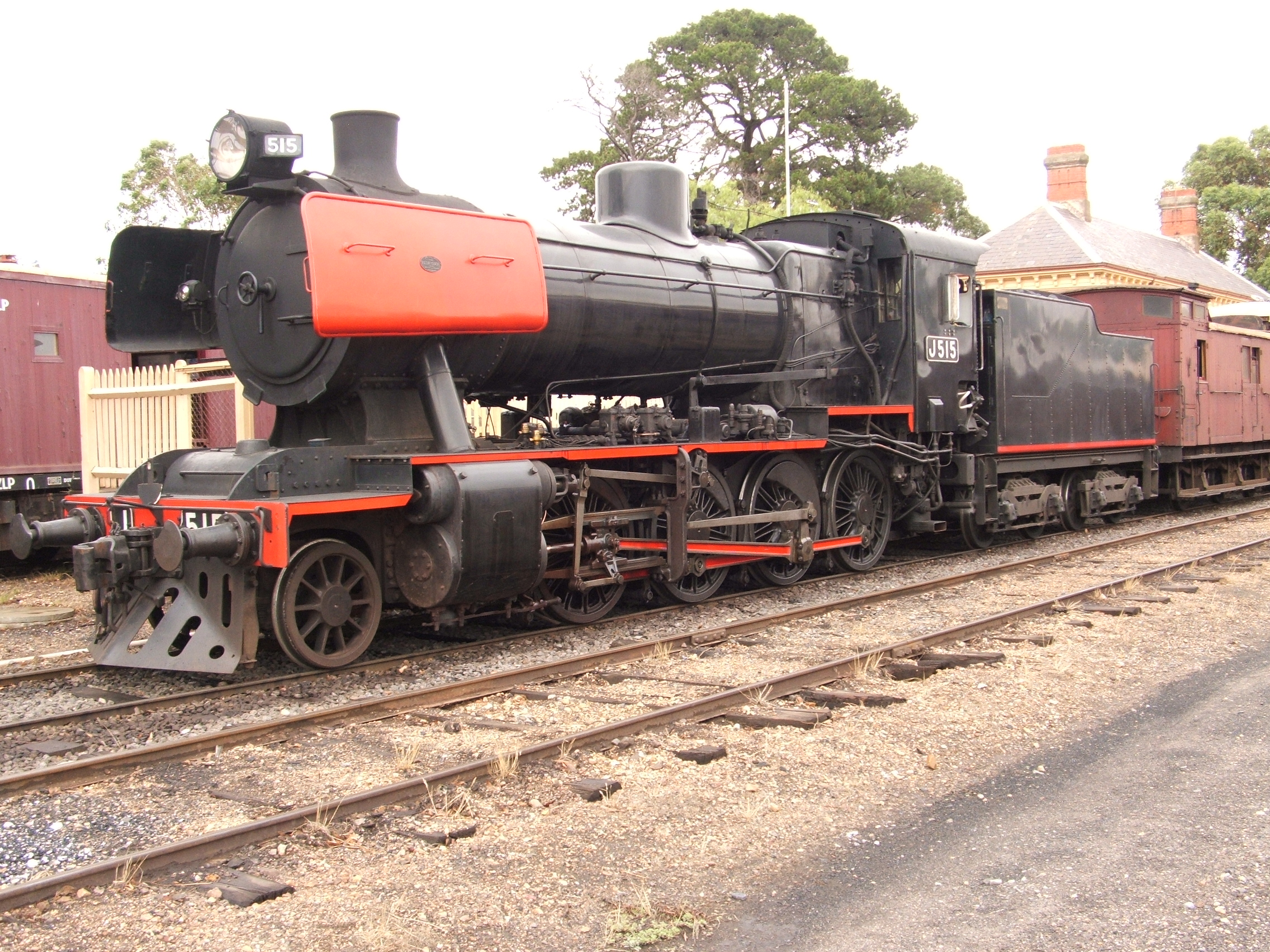
- Steam Locomotive J515 at Maldon station, January 2007

General information
- Location: 143.4 km (89.1 mi) from Flinders Street
- Elevation: 359 m (1,178 ft)
- System: Victorian Goldfields Railway station
- Owner: VicTrack
- Operator: Victorian Goldfields Railway
- Line: Former Maldon Line
- Platforms: 1
- Tracks: 4

Other information
- Status: Tourist station
- Station code: MAD
- Website: Victorian Goldfields Railway

History
- Opened: 16 June 1884; 31 March 1986 (re-opened)
- Closed: 3 December 1976

Services
Preceding station	Heritage Railways	Following station
Muckleford towards Castlemaine	Victorian Goldfields Railway	Terminus
Location

Maldon is a historic railway station on the Victorian Goldfields Railways Maldon branch line, off the main Bendigo, Echuca and Swan Hill lines in central Victoria, Australia. It was once the junction station for the Shelbourne extension.

== History ==
The station was originally opened on 16 June 1884. Passenger services ceased on 6 January 1941, and after that the line was used for goods traffic until its closure on 3 December 1976. In March 1986, the station was re-opened by the Victorian Goldfields Railway (VGR) for tourist services over a short 1 km section of the line out of Maldon. The line has since been extended to its former junction point at Castlemaine.

On 20 October 2009, the roof, kitchen and stationmaster's office were extensively damaged by fire.

== Platforms and services ==
The station has one platform. It is served by VGR heritage trains to Castlemaine.

Preceding station	Disused railways	Following station
Junction	Shelbourne Line	Pollard
	List of closed railway stations in Melbourne	
