= Muckleford =

Muckleford may refer to:

- Muckleford, Dorset, a hamlet in England
- Muckleford, Victoria, a locality in Australia
