= Muckleford railway station =

Railway station in Victoria, Australia

Coordinates: 37°01′26″S 144°09′10″E

Muckleford
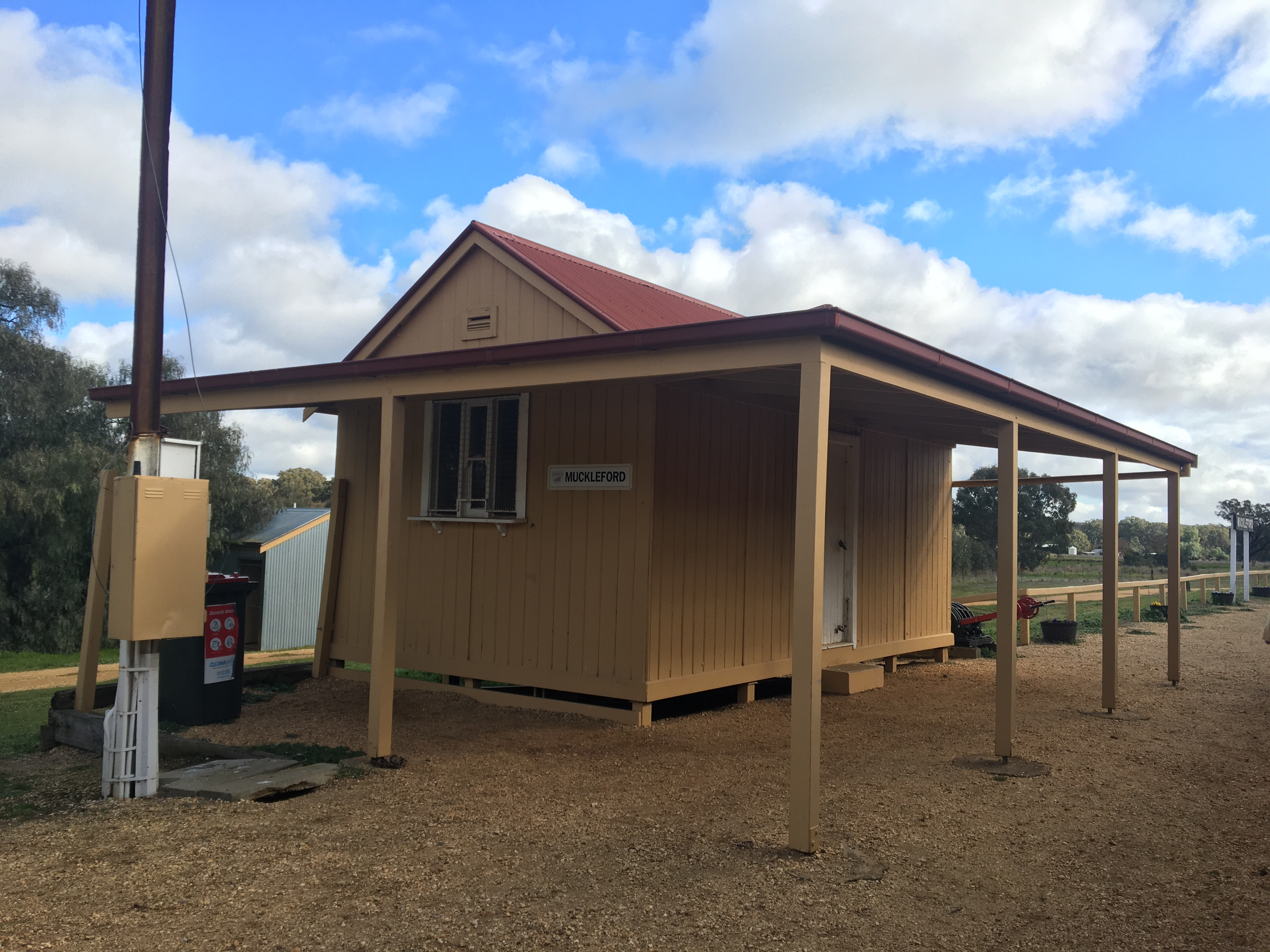
- Muckleford station building, July 2022

General information
- Location: 135.4 km (84.1 mi) from Flinders Street; Victoria, Australia
- Elevation: 277 m (909 ft)
- System: Victorian Goldfields Railway station
- Owner: VicTrack
- Operator: Victorian Goldfields Railway
- Line: Former Maldon Line
- Platforms: 1
- Tracks: 3

Other information
- Status: Tourist station
- Station code: MKD
- Website: Victorian Goldfields Railway

History
- Opened: 16 June 1884; 7 April 1996 (re-opened)
- Closed: 3 December 1976

Services
Preceding station	Heritage Railways	Following station
Castlemaine Terminus	Victorian Goldfields Railway	Maldon Terminus
Location

Muckleford is a railway station on the Maldon branch line off the main Echuca, Swan Hill lines in Victoria, Australia. The station was originally opened on 16 June 1884 and was closed to passenger services on 6 January 1941. After this date, the line was used only for goods traffic until closure on 3 December 1976.

Muckleford station was opened for tourist services in 1996 after the section of line between Maldon and Muckleford had been restored. This tourism train service will usually begin from Maldon, proceed through the surrounding bushland areas into Muckleford, and then enter Castlemaine from the west.

Currently, Muckleford is designated as a Non-Staffed station however, it can be opened as a Temporary Staff Station.

== Platforms and services ==
Muckleford has one platform, which is serviced by VGR services.

Platform 1

- Maldon Line: VGR Services to Castlemaine and Maldon
