= Kangaroo Flat =

Kangaroo Flat may refer to several places in Australia:

- Kangaroo Flat, Victoria, a suburb of Bendigo
  - Kangaroo Flat railway station
- Kangaroo Flat, South Australia, northwest of Gawler
