= Victorian Railways J class (1954) =

Class of Australian 2-8-0 steam locomotives

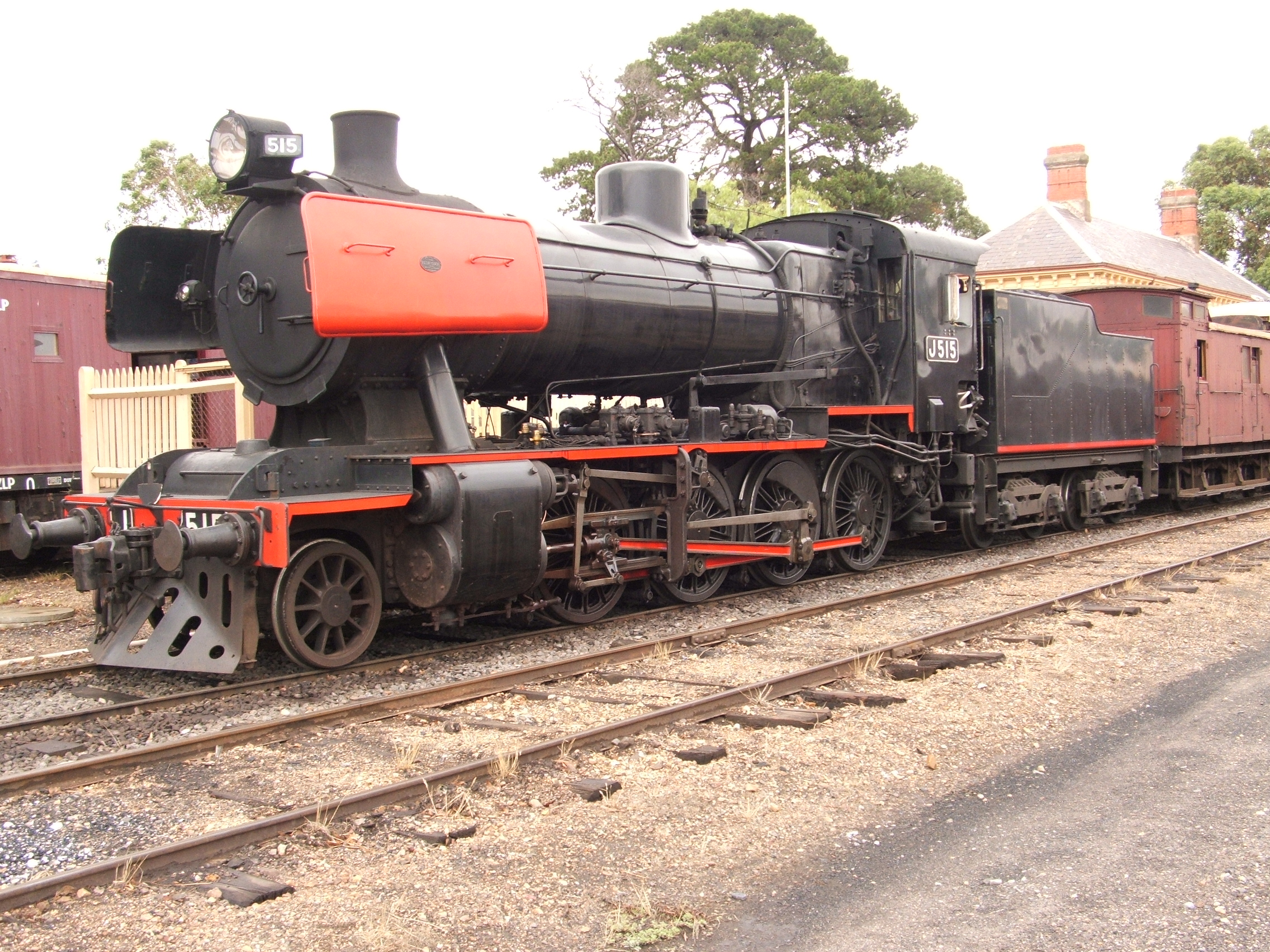
- J515 on the Victorian Goldfields Railway in January 2007
Type and origin
- Power type: Steam
- Builder: Vulcan Foundry
- Serial number: 6046–6095, 6146–6155
- Build date: 1954
- Total produced: 60
Specifications
- Configuration
  - Whyte: 2-8-0
- Gauge: 1,600 mm (5 ft 3 in)
- Driver dia.: 55 in (1,397 mm)
- Length: 60 ft 5 1/2 in (18.43 m)
- Axle load: 14.5 long tons (14.7 t; 16.2 short tons)
- Adhesive weight: 57.35 long tons (58.27 t; 64.23 short tons)
- Loco weight: 66.95 long tons (68.02 t; 74.98 short tons)
- Tender weight: 45.8 long tons (46.5 t; 51.3 short tons)
- Total weight: 112.75 long tons (114.56 t; 126.28 short tons)
- Fuel type: Coal (30); Oil (30)
- Fuel capacity: 5 long tons (5.1 t; 5.6 short tons) coal, 4,200 imp gal (19,000 L) water (coal burners); 1,500 imp gal (6,800 L) oil, 4,100 imp gal (19,000 L) water (oil burners)
- Firebox
  - Grate area: 31 sq ft (2.9 m^{2})
- Boiler pressure: 175 lbf/in^{2} (1.21 MPa), later 180 lbf/in^{2} (1.24 MPa)
- Heating surface: 1,682 sq ft (156.3 m^{2})
- Cylinders: 2
- Cylinder size: 20 in × 26 in (508 mm × 660 mm)
Performance figures
- Tractive effort: 28,650 lbf (127.4 kN) at 85% boiler pressure, later 29,500 lbf (131 kN)
Career
- Operators: Victorian Railways
- Numbers: J500-J559
- Disposition: 11 preserved, 49 scrapped

The Victorian Railways J class is a branch line steam locomotive operated by the Victorian Railways (VR) between 1954 and 1972. A development of the successful Victorian Railways K class 2-8-0, it was the last new class of steam locomotive introduced on the VR. Introduced almost concurrently with the diesel-electric locomotives that ultimately superseded them, the locomotives were only in service for a relatively short time.

== History ==
During the early 1950s, the Victorian Railways (VR) embarked on a massive upgrading of its ageing locomotive fleet as part of Operation Phoenix, an £80 million program to rebuild a network badly run down by years of underinvestment during the Great Depression, and the heavy workload imposed by World War II.

Victoria's branch line railway network, laid with 60 lb/yd (29.8 kg/m) rail and featuring gradients of up to 1 in 30 (3.33%), was still largely served by the D1, D2 and D3 variants of the once 261-strong 1902-era Dd class 4-6-0 which, by the early 1950s, were at the end of their life. The new J class locomotives were supplemented by 53 K class locomotives, some of which had been built as recently as 1946. Although highly successful, K class locomotives were unsuitable for conversion from 5 ft 3 in (1,600 mm) to 4 ft 8 1/2 in (1,435 mm) standard gauge in the event of the Victorian network being standardised, and VR policy was for all new locomotives to be engineered for easy conversion. Consequently, the building of further K class was not a feasible option.

With mainline electric and diesel-electric locomotives already on order, the VR design team opted for an updated, gauge-convertible K class, which would turn out to be their final steam locomotive design.

=== Design features ===
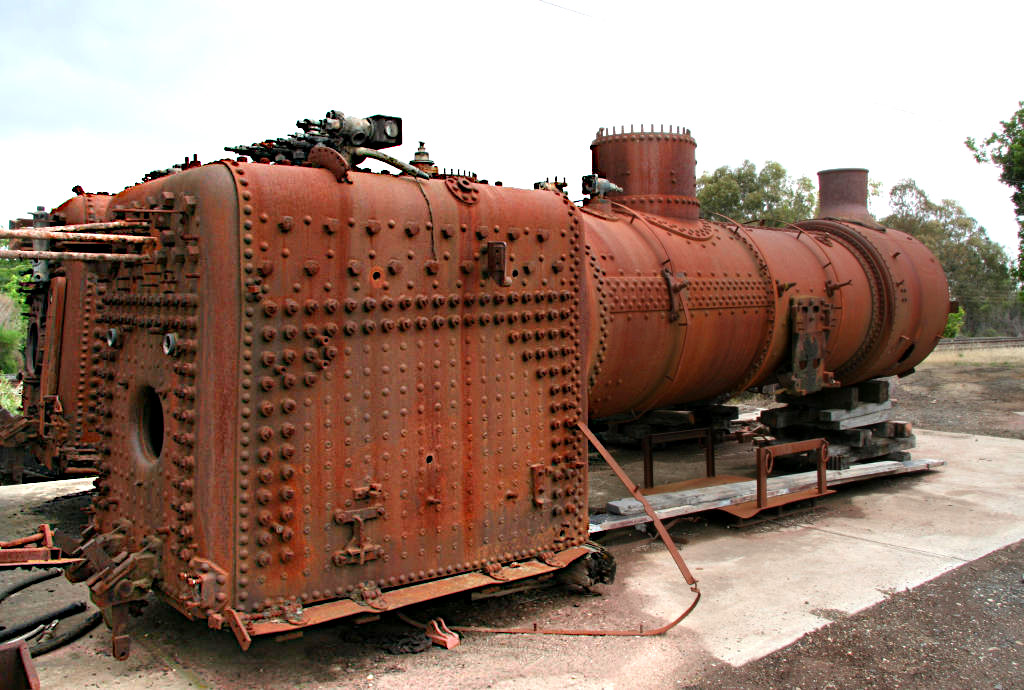
Firebox and boiler, in storage

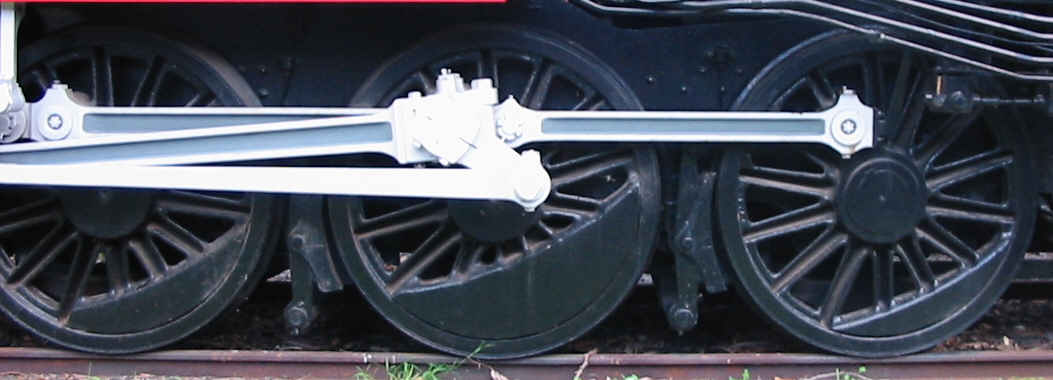
J class 'SCOA-P' pattern driving wheel centres

The key problem with the K class design was the placement of the firebox between the locomotive frame and rear driving wheels, making conversion to a narrower gauge impossible without a radical redesign of the firebox. A previous attempt to develop a gauge-convertible K class, the N class, utilised a 2-8-2 wheel arrangement and positioned the firebox above the frames and behind the driving wheels. However, the extra length of those locomotives (being a total 67 ft or 20.42 m long) made them unsuitable for a number of branch lines where only a 50-or-53-foot (15.24 or 16.15 m) turntable was available. The J class adopted an alternative approach to the problem by employing a high-set boiler (with the boiler centre 9 ft 2 1/2 in (2.807 m) above rail level, compared with 8 ft 4 in (2.54 m) for the K class) setting the firebox above the frames and driving wheels, and retaining the K class' short wheelbase.

The J class also featured a number of other design advances over the K class. It had a larger grate, enabling grate sections to be compatible with those of the N class and permitting an increase in firebox volume sufficient to allow two arch tubes to be installed. Another innovation was the use of a regulator valve incorporating a centrifugal steam separator (to draw away any water and thus provide the driest steam), rather than the simpler (though extremely reliable) D regulator valve used in the K class. The J class also featured substantially redesigned cylinder porting to improve steam flow and efficiency. The innovative SCOA-P type driving wheel centre developed for the Victorian Railways R class was adapted for the 55 in (1,397 mm) diameter J class drivers.

The high-set boiler, together with the German-style smoke deflectors, gave the J class a distinctly European appearance.

=== Production ===
A total of fifty J class locomotives were initially ordered from the Vulcan Foundry in Lancashire, England. However, the VR reassessed its motive power requirements and opted to sell 10 of its brand-new, second-generation N class locomotives to the South Australian Railways, and increased the J class order to 60. At the time of order, the per-unit cost of the locomotives was £36,000 ($72,000) each.

With fluctuating oil prices and an unreliable supply of coal in the early 1950s, the VR appeared to take something of a bet either way, ordering thirty of the class as coal burners and thirty as oil burners.

By the time the contract for the J class had been awarded, the VR had already begun to receive deliveries of the B class mainline diesel-electric locomotives, and it unsuccessfully attempted to cancel the J class contract in favour of an order for branch line diesel locomotives.

=== Service ===
The J class was introduced for both passenger and goods traffic on Victoria's branch line network, with a maximum permissible speed of 45 mph (72 km/h), later raised to 50 mph (80 km/h). Dynamometer car tests showed the locomotive developed 930 hp (694 kW) at the drawbar at around 20–25 mph (32–40 km/h), which suited the relatively low speed limits of much of the Victorian branch line network.

Coal-fired J class locomotives were the regular engine on the 09:00 Melbourne to Yarram passenger service, with other duties being from Lilydale to Warburton and local services from Spencer Street to Werribee. The oil-fired J was also pressed into service hauling the final leg of The Gippslander express from Sale to Bairnsdale. In their later years, J class locomotives also ran the Horsham to Dimboola leg of the morning service from Melbourne, one of the last regular steam-hauled passenger train services in Victoria.

Although J class locomotives produced the same nominal tractive effort as the K or N class, they had a slightly higher adhesive weight (and so a better factor of adhesion) and were permitted to haul heavier loads on gradients. They could be found in goods service on branch lines across the state, but were also found on mainlines, running roadside goods services.

Within a year of the introduction of the J class, the T class diesel electric locomotive was also introduced. Although the VR did not publicly indicate the T was intended to replace the J class, the T class proved to be such a successful design that further orders of that locomotive class were made during the late 1950s and 1960s, and T class units gradually displaced the J class from many of the latter's normal duties.

=== Design Improvements ===
Together with the K and N classes, the J class had its boiler pressure raised in the early 1960s from 175 to 180 psi (1,207 to 1,241 kPa), which raised their nominal tractive effort to 29,500 lbf (131 kN).

Following recommendations from the 1957 Australian and New Zealand Railway Conference, locomotive J546 was selected for the installation of a Laidlaw-Drew oil firing system in place of the convention weir-type burner. However, the locomotive was found to steam poorly under load using the Laidlaw-Drew system and was converted back to weir burner operation. No further locomotives were converted.

=== Demise ===
By the late 1960s, the J class was largely relegated to shunting at various country yards, with many losing their cowcatchers and gaining shunter's steps on sides of the tender. J554 was noted as the first of the oil-burning locomotives to be fitted with tender handrails and shunters steps. The introduction of the Y class diesel electrics saw the J class superseded in that role and, in November 1967, J523 became the first J class to be scrapped. Scrappings continued until June 1978, with J538 the last to go.

Some engines were converted to stationary boilers for workshop supplies. For example, J526 was parked outside Jolimont Workshops until late December 1972, having had its chimney replaced by a 25 ft (7.6 m) pipe and being fired by briquettes.

J550 holds the distinction of being the very last steam locomotive in normal revenue service on the Victorian Railways, being rostered on the 6 a.m. Bendigo pilot on 25 May 1972.

== Accidents and incidents ==
- At around midnight on 15 January 1966, J class J503 rear-ended N class N476, causing the latter to crash through the shed wall of the depot. N476 was damaged beyond repair and was scrapped after the wreck, while J503 had survived.

== Preservation ==
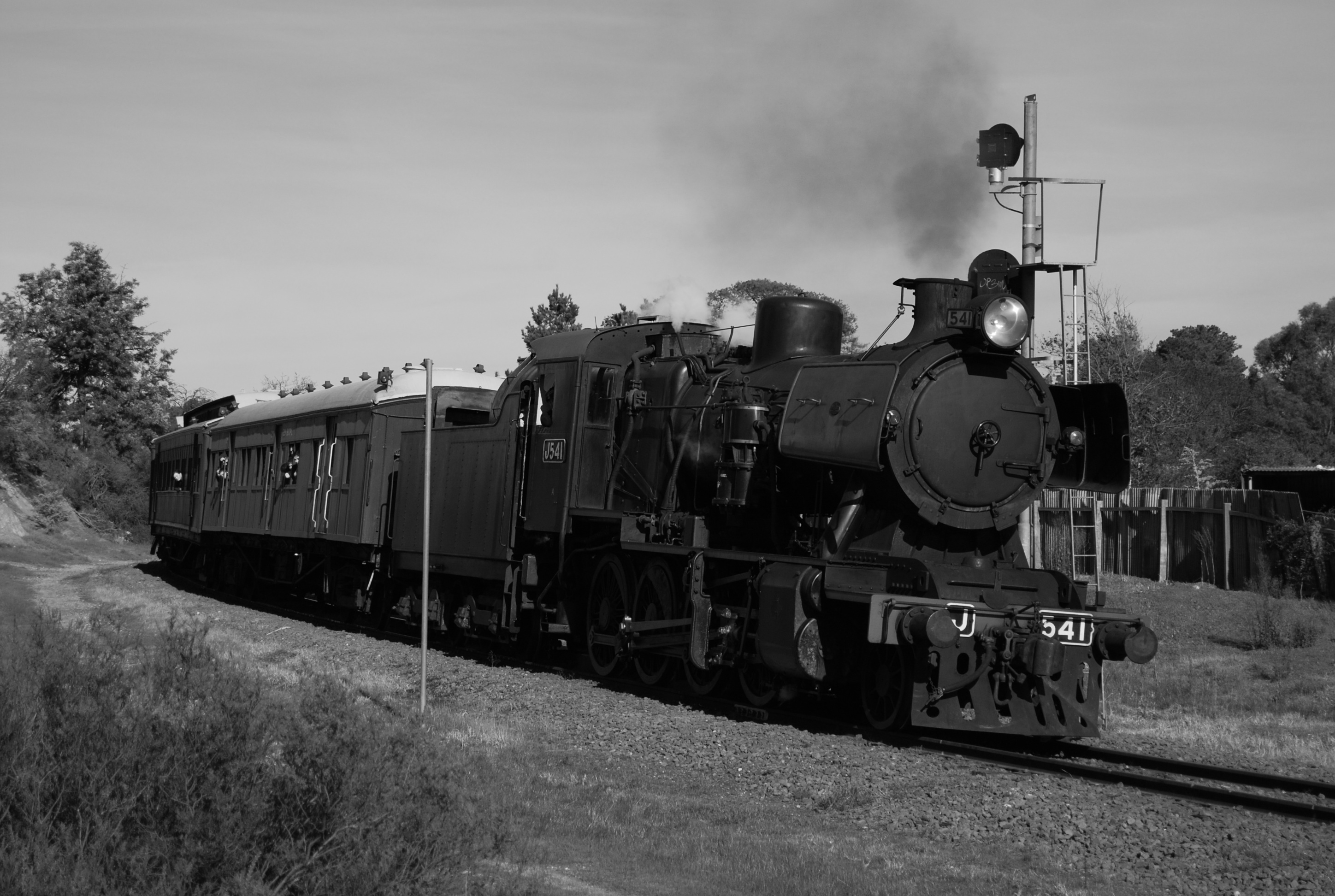
J541 near Castlemaine station in 2009

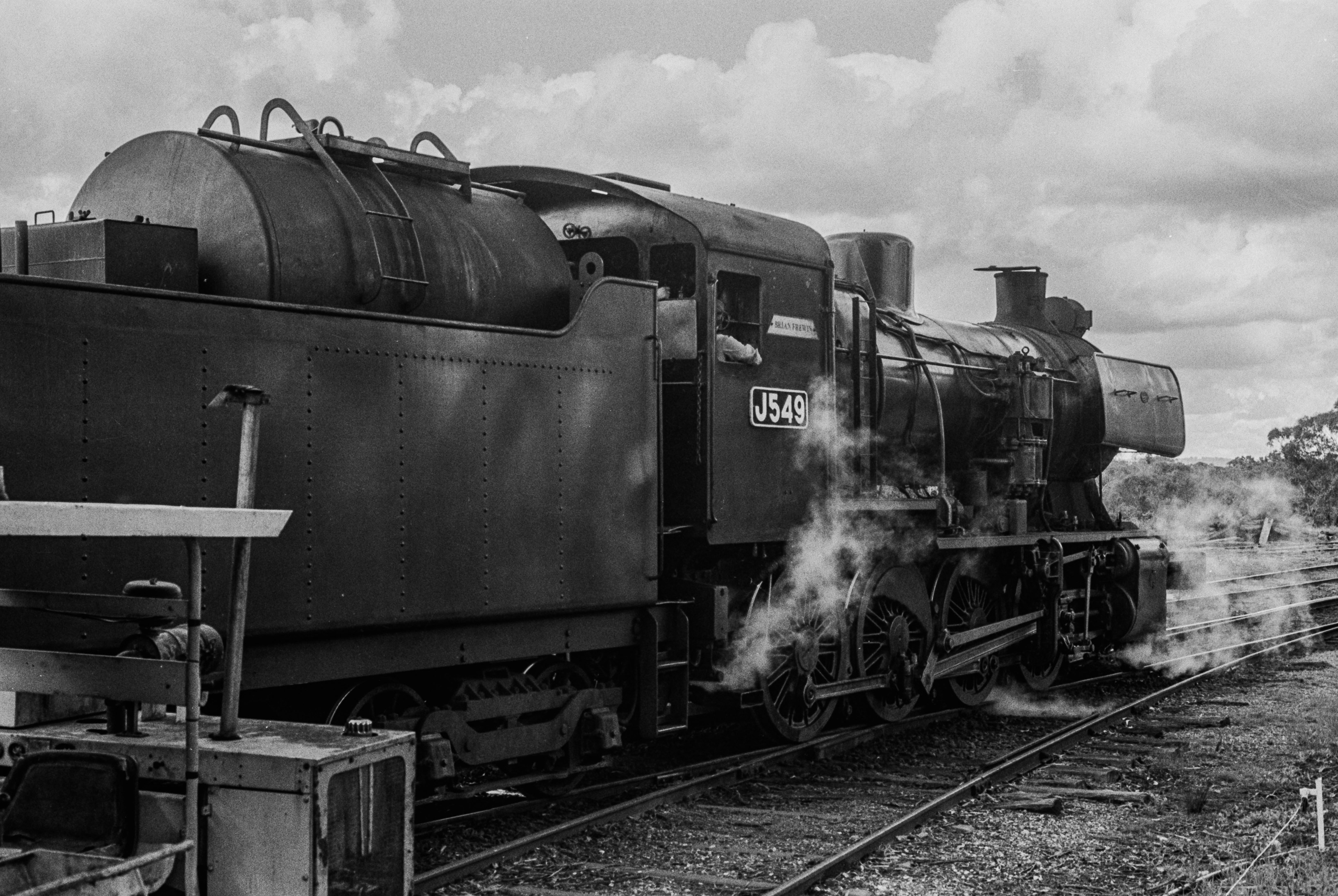
J549 at Maldon railway station in September 2016

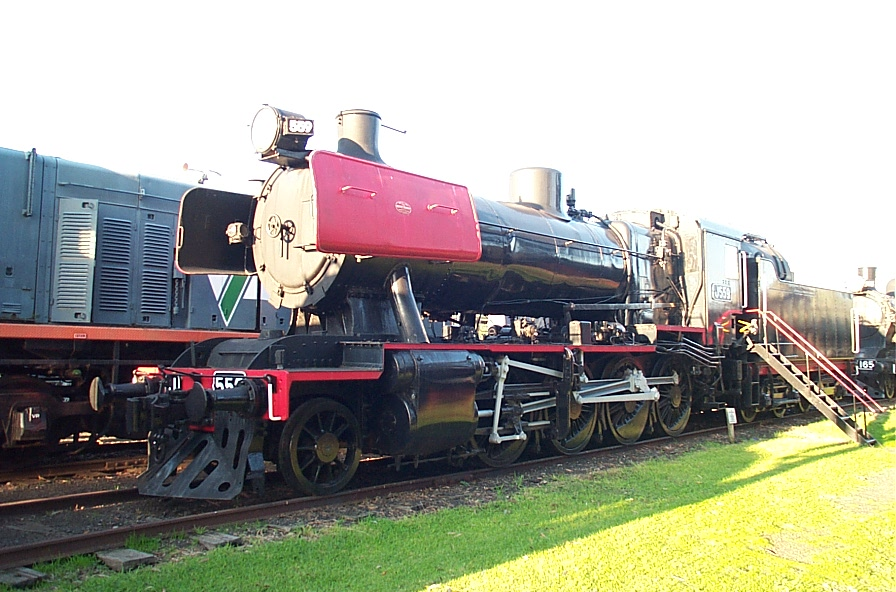
J556 at the Newport Railway Museum in 2006

The J class of engines remained complete much later than any other class of VR steam locomotives. By the time that J class scrapping commenced, interest in railway preservation was sufficient for eleven examples to be preserved.

=== Operational ===
- J 549: Owned and operated by the Victorian Goldfields Railway. The locomotive was out of service between March 2004 and October 2013, while undergoing a major overhaul. It underwent load trials along the Maldon branch line on 21 October 2013, and its first public outing was on 26 October 2013. The official re-launch of the engine was held on 27 January 2014. The locomotive was withdrawn in November 2022 for a major overhaul and repairs carried out at Castlemaine. The locomotive returned to service on 11th May 2024 after 493 days undergoing overhaul, hauling the Victorian Colonial Express

=== Under Restoration ===
- J 512 is owned by Seymour Railway Heritage Centre and is awaiting restoration. As part of the restoration, it was intended to be converted from broad to standard gauge. As of March 2010, the engine frames had been converted. As of August 2026, the Seymour Railway Heritage Centre's website lists its carriage fleet, but not its locomotive fleet. The "Projects" page does list J512 as still intended to be converted to standard gauge.
- J 515: Owned by Seymour Railway Heritage Centre. Restored in 1988, took part in Aus' Steam 88, and was loaned to Victorian Goldfields Railway until December 2006 when its mainline certificate expired. The locomotive returned to service April 2012 after two years out of traffic due to boiler repairs. After its lease to the VGR expired, It was returned to Seymour Railway Heritage Centre in January 2015 for an overhaul. The Locomotive is expected to return to traffic once all funds of $80,000 is reached, including the purchase of ICE Radio Equipment, to allow the Locomotive to operate on the Mainline.
- J 541: Transferred to Newport Workshops in April 2012, after its lease to the Victorian Goldfields Railway ended. While at Newport, the locomotive was intended to undergo repairs and maintenance by Steamrail Victoria (SRV) prior to its transfer to its intended home at the Yarra Valley Railway. However, it has remained at Newport for over a decade. On the 19th of May 2025, Steamrail Victoria issued a public notice offering the locomotive for sale as unclaimed goods via tender. The locomotive is owned by a private syndicate, which includes Yarra Valley Railway members and the railway itself.

=== Static ===
Victorian Railways J class locomotive No. 507 by the lake at dawn in Mulwala

- J 507 is plinthed at Mulwala, New South Wales. This is the only broad gauge Australian Steam Locomotive outside Victoria and South Australia that is still Broad Gauge.
- J 516 is owned by the Yarra Valley Railway. While the locomotive was stripped down for a restoration assessment in June 2009, the project was ultimately determined to be unfeasible at that time. The locomotive has since remained in a dismantled state, with the frame and boiler stored in the open air across from the platform at Healesville.
- J 524 is plinthed at Donald.
- J 536 was plinthed at Colac station until 1998. It was acquired by West Coast Railway (WCR) in 1997 and moved to Ballarat East for restoration. Following the demise of WCR, the locomotive was sold to heritage group 707 Operations for eventual restoration to operating service and was moved to the Newport Workshops. Since its arrival at Newport, the locomotive has remained in long-term storage and has been partially dismantled. Restoration efforts have been stalled due to significant technical issues, including the discovery of damage to the locomotive frames and the condition of the boiler, which have rendered a return to service unfeasible under current assessments.
- J 539 is plinthed at Apex Park in Dimboola.
- J 550 was plinthed at Warragul until 24 March 2013. It is now on public display at Noojee, ahead of a planned restoration to working order.
- J 556, is preserved at the Newport Railway Museum in Newport, Victoria, wearing the historically significant plates of scrapped J559, the last steam locomotive to enter service on the VR.
