= Bendigo railway station =

Railway station in Victoria, Australia

Bendigo
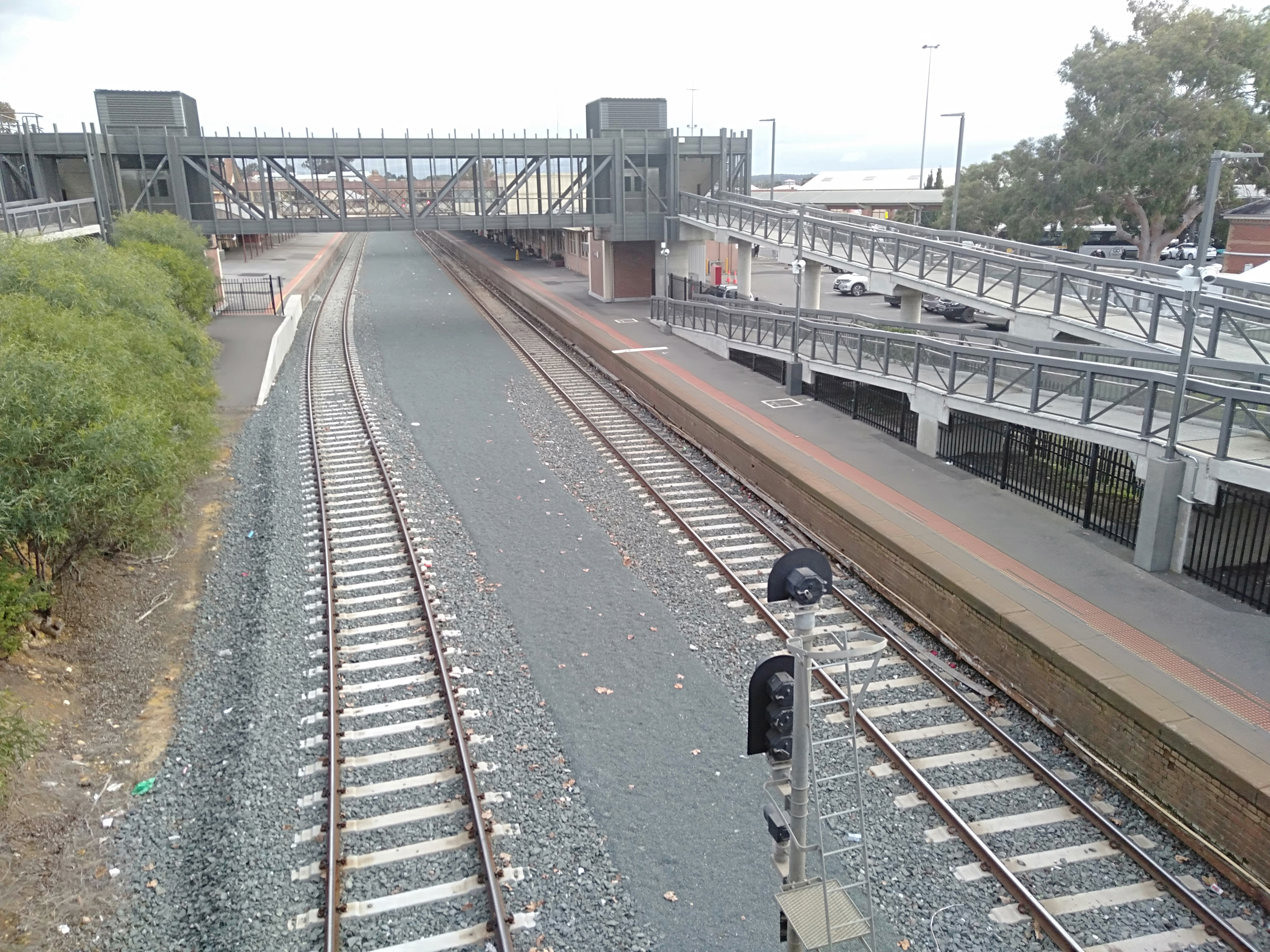
- Southbound view of the station platforms, June 2022

General information
- Location: Railway Place, Bendigo, Victoria 3550; City of Greater Bendigo; Australia
- Coordinates: 36°45′56″S 144°16′59″E
- System: PTV regional rail station
- Owner: VicTrack
- Operator: V/Line
- Lines: Bendigo; Echuca (Deniliquin); Swan Hill (Piangil)
- Distance: 162.24 kilometres from Southern Cross
- Platforms: 2
- Tracks: 2
- Connections: Bus

Construction
- Structure type: At-grade
- Parking: Yes
- Cycle facilities: Available
- Accessible: Yes

Other information
- Status: Operational, staffed
- Station code: BDG
- Fare zone: Myki zone 13
- Website: Public Transport Victoria

History
- Opened: 21 October 1862; 163 years ago
- Former names: Sandhurst (1862–1891)

Passengers
- 2023–2024: 456,400

Services
Preceding station	V/Line	Following station
Kangaroo Flat towards Southern Cross	Bendigo line	Terminus
Kangaroo Flat towards Southern Cross	Echuca line	Epsom towards Echuca
Kangaroo Flat towards Southern Cross	Bendigo line Weekdays only (Deniliquin line)	Epsom Terminus
Kangaroo Flat towards Southern Cross	Swan Hill line	Eaglehawk towards Swan Hill
Kangaroo Flat towards Southern Cross	Bendigo line Weekdays only (Piangil line)	Eaglehawk Terminus
Former service
Preceding station	Disused railways	Following station
Golden Square	Deniliquin line	Line open
Location
- Location within Victoria

Bendigo railway station is a regional railway station on the Deniliquin and Piangil lines, part of the Victorian railway network. It serves the city of Bendigo, Victoria, Australia. Bendigo is a ground level premium station, featuring two side platforms. It opened on 21 October 1862, with the updated station provided in 1965. Initially opened as Sandhurst, the station was given the name of Bendigo on 1 September 1891.

The disused station at Golden Square is located between Bendigo and Kangaroo Flat.

== History ==
Situated on the eastern edge of the central business district of Bendigo, the name of the station was changed in 1891, when the city was also renamed. The station also serves as the terminus for many of V/Line's Bendigo line services.

The station was rebuilt after being destroyed by fire on 23 December 1965.

The station building on Platform 2 was refurbished in 1984. The light refreshment booth was demolished around that time, and the footbridge and ironwork were repainted. Additional refurbishments occurred in 1988.

During 1989/1990, much of the station and yard was rearranged, including the abolition of signal boxes "A", "B", "C" and "D", and the provision of new signal masts and turnouts.

== Platforms and services ==
Bendigo has two side platforms. Platform 1 is on the north-west side and Platform 2 is on the south-east side of the railway line. Both platforms are used by V/Line Bendigo, Echuca and Swan Hill line services.

Bendigo platform arrangement
Platform	Line	Destination	Notes	Via	Source
1	Bendigo line Echuca line Swan Hill line	Southern Cross	Most Melbourne bound services depart this platform.	Sunbury	
1	Bendigo line Echuca line Swan Hill line	Epsom, Eaglehawk, Echuca, Swan Hill		Epsom or Eaglehawk	
2	Bendigo line Echuca line Swan Hill line	Southern Cross		Sunbury	
2	Bendigo line Echuca line Swan Hill line	Epsom, Eaglehawk, Echuca, Swan Hill		Epsom or Eaglehawk	

== Transport links ==
Christian's Bus Company operates thirteen routes via Bendigo station, under contract to Public Transport Victoria:

- 5 : Huntly – Kangaroo Flat
- 50 : to Epsom station
- 51 : to Eaglehawk
- 52 : to Eaglehawk
- 53 : to Eaglehawk
- 54 : to Maiden Gully
- 55 : to Kangaroo Flat
- 60 : to East Bendigo
- 61 : to La Trobe University Bendigo Campus
- 62 : to Spring Gully
- 63 : Bendigo Base Hospital – La Trobe University Bendigo Campus
- 64 : to Golden Square
- 65 : to Spring Gully

Organ's Coaches operates one route to and from Bendigo station, under contract to Public Transport Victoria:

- to Heathcote

Whitmores Bus Lines operates one route to and from Bendigo station, under contract to Public Transport Victoria:

- 70 : to Strathfieldsaye

== Gallery ==
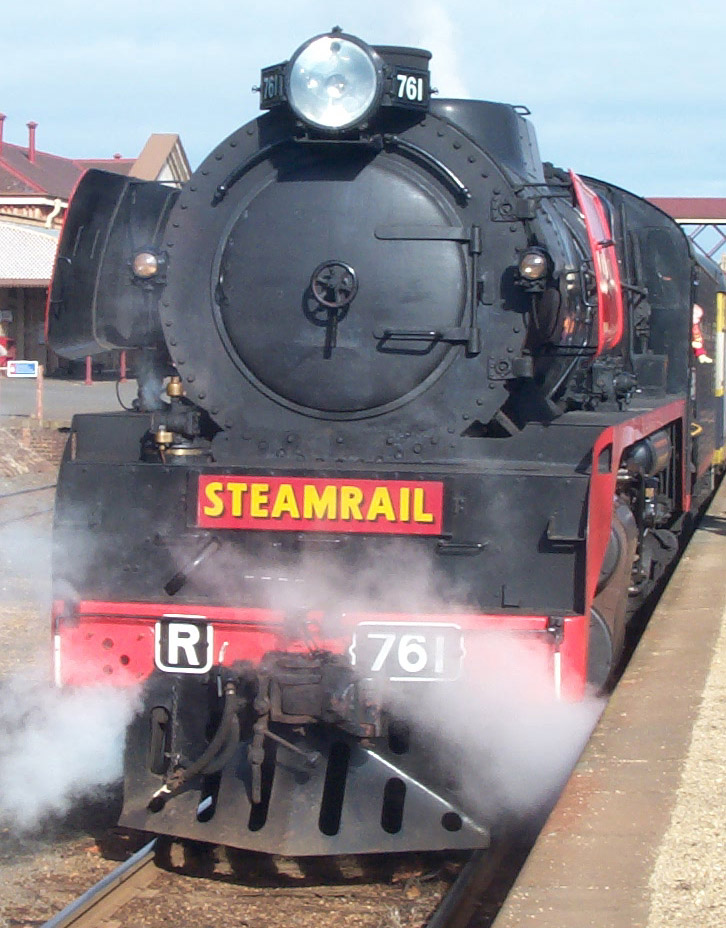
Steamrail locomotive R761 sits at Platform 2, June 2003

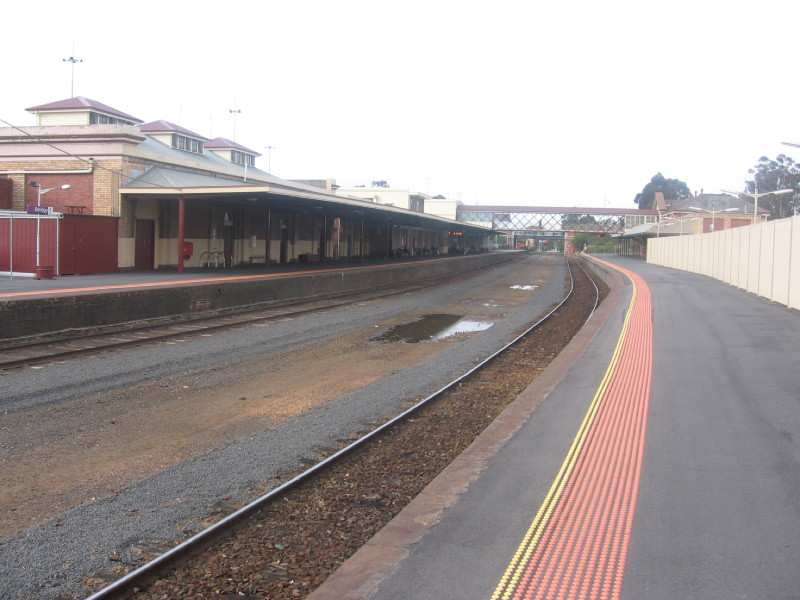
Northbound view from Platform 2,
September 2009
