= Spring Gully, Victoria =

Spring Gully Bendigo, Victoria
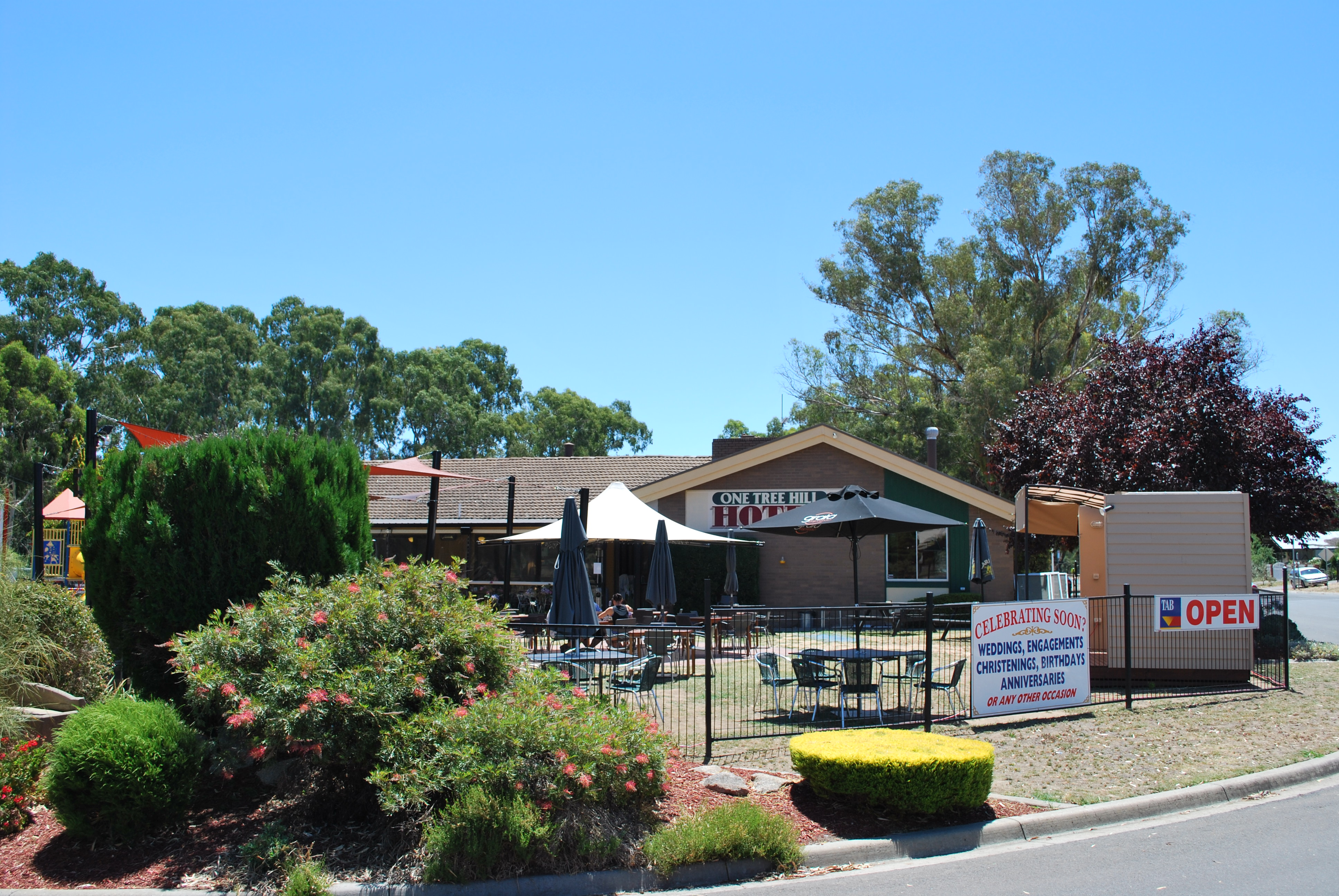
- One Tree Hill Hotel in Spring Gully, 2010

- Coordinates: 36°47′55″S 144°17′14″E
- Population: 3,092 (2021 census)
- Postcode(s): 3550
- Location: 5 km (3 mi) S of Bendigo
- LGA(s): City of Greater Bendigo
- State electorate(s): Bendigo East
- Federal division(s): Bendigo

Spring Gully is a suburb of the regional city of Bendigo in north central Victoria, Australia, 5 kilometres (3.1 mi) south of the Bendigo city centre. At the 2021 census, Spring Gully had a population of 3,092.

== History ==
the name "Spring Gully" is thought to be a descriptive of a natural feature of the area. The district historically supported gold mining activities and contributed to the Spring Gully Reservoir, constructed in 1877 to supply water to Bendigo for domestic and mining purposes. While the reservoir primarily relied on water channeled from the Coliban system at Malmsbury, its capacity was expanded fivefold in 1930 to support irrigation as far as White Hills and Huntly, despite significant water losses along its seventy miles of channels. The construction of the reservoir led to the submergence of the Spring Gully Hotel. Spring Gully Primary School was established in 1906, serving a small community that included a hall, a store, and a hotel. By the 1970s, Bendigo's urban expansion reached the area, spurring further development. A retirement village was opened in 1982.
