= Victorian Goldfields Railway =

Tourist railway in Victoria, Australia

Coordinates: 37°1′8.29″S 144°8′44.34″E

Overview
- Termini: Maldon; Castlemaine
- Connecting lines: Deniliquin line
- Former connections: Shelbourne Line, Moolort line
- Website: vgr.com.au

Service
- Type: Tourist Railway

History
- Opened: 16 June 1884
- Completed: 24 March 1891
- Closed: 3 December 1976
- Reopened: 31 March 1986 (141.1 km - Maldon) 7 April 1996 (Muckleford - 141.1 km) 14 December 2004 (Castlemaine - Maldon)

Technical
- Line length: 17 km (10.6 mi)
- Num of tracks: Single track
- Track gauge: 1,600 mm (5 ft 3 in)
- Signalling: Staff & Ticket

The Victorian Goldfields Railway (VGR) is a 1,600 mm (5 ft 3 in) broad gauge tourist railway in Victoria, Australia. It operates along a formerly disused branch line between the towns of Maldon and Castlemaine.

== History ==
The original line was opened on 16 June 1884, opening up rail access from the established station at Castlemaine to the towns of Muckleford and Maldon. The area was prosperous, as Castlemaine and Maldon had both experienced gold rushes in the preceding years, and local residents had been petitioning the government for a railway since 1874. On 2 August 1884, a contract was let for an extension to Laanecoorie, however further construction was suspended after the line reached the small town of Shelbourne in 1891.

The line was served by twice-daily trains for the first forty years of its life, which was increased to four-times-daily trains in 1924. However, these were cut back at the end of the 1920s due to a decrease in the local population, and passenger services were eliminated altogether during World War II. This meant that the line was used by only a weekly goods train which went through to Shelbourne. When bushfire damage caused the closure of the Shelbourne extension in 1970, the remainder of the line was rendered largely useless, and it was officially closed on 3 December 1976.

The response to the closure from the local community was swift, and the Castlemaine & Maldon Railway Preservation Society (CMRPS) was founded in the same month, with the intention of reopening the line as a tourist railway. While Maldon station was intact, and was able to be used as a base for their operations, they were faced with numerous problems: a line that needed substantial repairs, a lack of rolling stock, and rebuilding the demolished station at Muckleford.

== Reconstruction ==
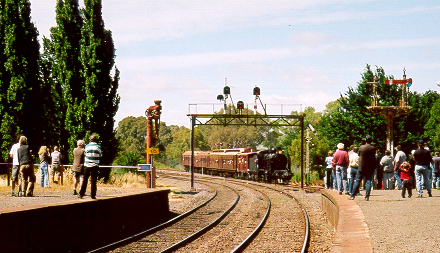
First train from Maldon approaches Castlemaine station, 19 December 2004

Over the next decade, volunteers obtained and renovated rolling stock and by 1986, trains were able to operate on a one kilometre section of track out of Maldon. By 1996, the line from Muckleford to Maldon had been restored, with the platforms being reinstated and a small replacement building being constructed. Services were able to operate along a regular timetable, and the society set about reopening the Muckleford-Castlemaine section of the line.

The project received the support of the local, state and federal governments. The necessary physical work had largely been completed by 2003, but it took another year to secure the necessary approvals and sign an agreement with freight operator Pacific National over the use of its line into Castlemaine station, which is still in regular passenger use today. The section of line finally opened on 19 December 2004, approximately a year behind schedule. As of April 2006, the Society has shown no plans to restore the dismantled Shelbourne extension in the foreseeable future.

== Current operations ==
The railway now operates two return trips to Castlemaine on Sundays, Wednesdays and public holidays. Steam locomotives operate most services, although the Society also operates diesels during days of total fire ban or when steam is not available. During December, January and February all services are hauled by diesel locomotives.

The Railway also operates a number of special trains such as Ales on Rails and Murder on the Orient Express Trains. Additionally, the railway offers Driver Experiences, where customers can drive a locomotive and Footplate Experiences where they can ride in the cab for either the Maldon to Muckleford or Muckleford to Maldon leg of the trip.

== Rolling stock ==
=== Owned locomotives ===
Number	Image	Year built	Builder	Status	Notes
D3 619		1914	Newport Workshops	Stored	Was stored at the Bendigo Loco Depot.
D3 646		1905	Newport Workshops	Stored	Was plinthed just outside of Maryborough Railway Station.
E371		1892	David Munro & Co, South Melbourne	Under Restoration	To be restored to Operational Condition by the VGR.
J 549		1954	Vulcan Foundry	Operational	Returned to service on 11 May 2024 following an overhaul.
K 157		1940	Newport Workshops	Stored	Used for spare parts for K160.
K 160		1941	Newport Workshops	Operational	Was in service from 1986 until 2012, when it was withdrawn and transferred to Steamrail Victoria's Newport Workshops depot for a major overhaul. On 28 February 2026, K160 moved under its own steam for the first time since 2012. On 22 August 2026, K160 returned to the VGR and officially returned to service on 28 August.
F 212		1953	Dick Kerr Works, Preston	Under Overhaul	To be used as the Maldon yard shunter.
T 333		1956	Clyde Engineering, Granville	Currently being re-activated	Was on long-term loan to Seymour Railway Heritage Centre, based at their Seymour depot who until 2013, sub-leased it to defunct freight company El Zorro. In 2019, T333 returned to VGR attached to the transfer of the Royal Train and after a period of storage, it moved under its own power in 2022 for the first time since 2013.
Y 133		1965	Clyde Engineering, Granville	Operational	Allocated to the VGR from the Register of Heritage and Tourist Railways. The Y was formerly allocated to Seymour Railway Heritage Centre. In 2016 it was sent to Melbourne for maintenance and returned to the VGR in 2016. Returned to service in 2019 after being repainted by the VGR Young Volunteers Group.
61 RM "Super DERM"		1930	Newport Workshops	stored	Operated until 2009, Loaned to South Gippsland Railway 2010 - 2015. Stored requiring repairs. Seen running in Castlemaine yard 15 May 2024.
RT 31		1962	Newport Workshops	Operational	Was located at Graincorp Terminal, Deniliquin NSW. Donated to the VGR in 2024. Used as the Castlemaine yard shunter.
APM DL 1			Malcolm Moore Pty Ltd. Port Melbourne	Stored	0-4-0 Shunter, ex Australian Paper Mills, Broadford.

=== Leased locomotives ===
Since 2011, Steamrail Victoria have leased members of their fleet to the VGR in order to lighten the load on the railway's own limited fleet. This has seen use of K190, K153, D3 639 and Y164 on the Maldon branch. In the table below are the current (as of August 2026) locomotives being leased to the Victorian Goldfields Railway.

Number	Image	Year built	Builder	Status	Notes
T 364		1962	Clyde Engineering, Granville	Operational	On loan from Steamrail Victoria, arrived on 22 August 2026.

=== Carriages ===
Number	Image	Year built	Status	Builder	Notes
18 AE		1909	Transferred to Seymour Railway Heritage Centre	Victorian Railways	Transferred to SRHC 16 December 2010.
15 BE		1908	Transferred to Seymour Railway Heritage Centre	Victorian Railways	Transferred to SRHC 16 December 2010.
20 BE		1909	Transferred to Seymour Railway Heritage Centre	Victorian Railways	Transferred to SRHC 16 December 2010.
2 BCE		1909	Transferred to Seymour Railway Heritage Centre	Victorian Railways	Transferred to SRHC 16 December 2010.
80 BW		1926	Operational	Victorian Railways	On loan from Steamrail Victoria since 23 June 2013.
25 ABU		1914	Stored	Victorian Railways	Used as volunteer accommodation at Maldon Station.
41 BU			Operational	Victorian Railways	
42 BU			Operational	Victorian Railways	
23 AW		1914	Operational	Victorian Railways	
39 AW		1925	Stored	Victorian Railways	
64 AW		1927	Operational	Victorian Railways	On loan from Steamrail Victoria: Transferred 21 September 2024.
43 BPL		1921	Operational	Victorian Railways	Modified to provide disabled access.
29 BCPL		1921	Stored	Victorian Railways	
30 BCPL		1921	Operational	Victorian Railways	
BZN 256		1958	Stored	Victorian Railways	Formerly 6AZ - Part of the 1983 Royal Train. Delivered to the VGR on 1 December 2024.
BTN 263		1959	Stored	Victorian Railways	Formerly 13AZ. Delivered to the VGR on 26 May 2023.
BZN 268		1958	Stored	Victorian Railways	Formerly 5BZ. Delivered to the VGR on 26 May 2023.
40 X		1861	Operational	Victorian Railways	Used on Colonial Express Trains.
309 Y		1886	Operational	Victorian Railways	Used on Colonial Express Trains.
68 YZ		1886	Stored	Victorian Railways	Stored on 6 wheel Z Van underframe ex 395ZL.
69 YZ		1886	Operational	Victorian Railways	Used on Colonial Express Trains.
382 YH		1877	Stored	Phoenix Foundry Ballarat	Was 4 wheel saloon 'Holiday' car. Stored on 6 wheel underframe ex WX1.
Tambo		1919	Operational	Victorian Railways	Owned by Victorian Goldfields Railway. Operational for use on trains as a First Class Carriage.
Acheron		1923	Operational	Victorian Railways	Restored in 2022 to operate as a First Class Carriage.
Macedon		1928	Operational	Pullman Company	Operational for use on trains as a First Class Carriage.
Lowanna		1942	Transferred to 707 Operations	South Australian Railways	Former SAR first class country lines steel car, converted in 1973 to power/crew car for VIP trains. Sold to 707 Operations members and transferred to Melbourne in April 2023.

=== Guard's vans ===
Number	Image	Year built	Status	Builder	Notes
18 C		1891	Stored	Victorian Railways Ballarat North Workshops	
31 CE		1923	Stored	Victorian Railways Newport Workshops	On loan from Steamrail Victoria.
16 ZLP		1962	Under Restoration	Victorian Railways Ballarat North Workshops	
333 Z		1912	Operational	Victorian Railways Newport Workshops	
518 Z		1917	Stored - Privately Owned	Victorian Railways Newport Workshops, Ellingworth & Party	
563 Z		1925	Stored - Privately Owned	Victorian Railways Newport Workshops, Gonie & Party	
611 ZD		1928	Operational	Victorian Railways Newport Workshops	

== Highlights ==
29 March 1986: First section of railway reopened between Maldon station and the Bendigo Road crossing (approx. 1 km). The reopening train consist being K160-2BCE-42BU-16BCPL.

1987: Diesel locomotives F212 and T333 acquired from VicRail. F212 was transferred from Melbourne to Maldon by road. T333 was railed from Bendigo to Maldon.

31 March 1991: Locomotive J549 makes its first move under steam and returned to service later that year.

9 October 1993: Railmotor 61RM officially handed over to the VGR. It had been held by a group of railmotor drivers at Spencer St prior to being railed to Bendigo and then trucked to Maldon.

25 September 1995: Locomotive D3 646 retrieved from a park outside Maryborough Railway Station.

8 June 1996: Line officially reopened to Muckleford. J549 was used on the official train.

11–12 July 1998: First heritage rail weekend, promoted as "Steamfreight '98". A variety of passenger, goods and mixed trains ran with K160, J549, T333, F212 and 61RM over the 2 days.

July 1999: "Steamfreight '99", the 2nd such event held. A similar program of operations to the previous one. Highlights included K160 being renumbered K157 on the Sunday. A triple headed goods also operated with "K157"-T333-F212.

May 2001: "Steamfreight 2001", the 3rd such event to be held. K160, J549, T333 and 61RM operated. 2 L type sheep wagons were transferred by road from the collection at Castlemaine and restored for this event.

19–20 June 2007: The VGR held a Steam on Show Event using J515, K160 & diesel Y133. A variety of passenger, goods and mixed trains operated from Maldon to Castlemaine on the 19th, while regular services ran as mixed trains headed by K160 and J515 on the 20th.

26 July 2008: The VGR ran the first double-headed J Class working in thirty years, using J515 and J541.

6 September 2008: The VGR held the first "Picnic at Muckleford" event, combined with Steam on Show. The major highlight of this event was the first triple headed steam on the VGR (and the Castlemaine-Maldon branchline) with K160-J515-J541. A variety of passenger and mixed trains ran throughout the day.

14 June 2009: The VGR celebrated the 125th anniversary of the Castlemaine-Maldon line with a special train from Castlemaine hauled by doubled headed J class. Steamrail Victoria operated double headed R class from Melbourne as part of the festivities.

19 December 2010: E cars 2BCE, 20BE, 15BE & 18AE, were sold to the SRHC & transferred from Maldon to Seymour for restoration.

29 October 2011: Steamrail Victoria locomotive K190 transferred by rail from Melbourne to Maldon to provide back-up motive power. It left the railway on 9 March 2012. It returned for a second period of hire on 23 October 2012 and left on 23 June 2013.

26 November 2011: Another "Steam on Show" event was held. K190-K160 ran a special mixed train from Maldon to Muckleford with K190 leading tender-first and K160 trailing funnel-first. At Muckleford K160 ran around the train to form a tender-to-tender formation for the run to Castlemaine. The return from Castlemaine was run as a double-header with K190 leading K160.

12 May 2013: Diesel Electric Rail Motor Preservation Association Victoria ran a special from Melbourne to Maldon and return with 58RM. It was the first time a passenger train has operated such a trip since the last VR train on the Maldon line in November 1976. The railmotor crossed J515 operating the regular VGR service in both directions.

23 June 2013: D3 639 arrived at Maldon by rail from Melbourne on loan from Steamrail Victoria, making it the first time a D3 has traveled on the branch in forty years.

20 October 2013: J549 undertakes its first test runs after completion of a 9-year overhaul. During the overhaul the loco received new tyres on the pony truck and coupled wheels, a new smokebox barrel, cylinders re-bored, motion gear re-metaled and the tender bogie wheels re-profiled. The test run included a light engine trial around Maldon yard, followed by a line test to Muckleford and return with Y133. The following week it undertook load tests to Muckleford and Castlemaine.

26 October 2013: Steamrail Victoria and the VGR operate a special tour from Melbourne to Maldon and return, dubbed the "Maldon Steam Spectacular". R761-K190 hauled the train from Melbourne to Castlemaine where it transferred to the VGR yards. R761 was removed from the train and locomotive J515 and carriage 42BU were added. K190-J515 then ran from Castlemaine to Muckleford with photostops en route. At Muckleford J515 was swapped with J549 which had operated a Wedding Charter from Maldon. K190-J549 then continued to Maldon where K190 was left for another hire stint on the railway. D3 639 was attached and the train returned to Castlemaine. Upon its return to Castlemaine J549 and 42BU were shunted off and the D3 turned. R761-D3 639 returned the train from Castlemaine to Melbourne later that evening.

20 January 2014: K160 transferred by road from Maldon to Newport Workshops. It was moved to Newport to conduct a major overhaul. A finish date for this overhaul is unknown at this stage.

15–17 August 2014: Steamrail Victoria operate a special weekend tour from Melbourne to Castlemaine with K153 and T356 on 15 August. K153 then joined K190 which was already at the VGR to operate the special to Maldon early on the morning of 16 August. A series of workings using both K-class locos operated in either double-headed, tender-to-tender and tender-first combinations on passenger or mixed trains for the remainder of the day. Both K153-K190 returned to Melbourne with the mainline train and T356 on 17 August.

19 October 2014: To commemorate the Centenary of the commencement of the First World War, a special re-enactment of the troop trains that conveyed Australian soldiers to Ports for transport to the Warfronts was operated on 19 October 2014 under the banner "Answering the Call". The train was hauled by D3 639 from Steamrail and J515 from the SRHC. The D3 was decked out with flags and a special headboard while the train itself featured replica banners that appeared on the original troop specials.

13 December 2014: Centenary of the first DD-class locomotive constructed at Thompson's Foundry Castlemaine. Locomotive DD 893 rolled out of the foundry on 12 December 1914. To commemorate the Centenary Steamrail locomotive D3 639 was used to re-enact the locomotive steaming from the foundry (instead using the new VGR carriage shed to represent the foundry shed). The D3 also bore replica DD 893 plates as well as replica Thompson's Foundry plates.

13 February 2016: Steamrail Victoria transferred 31CE behind Y164 and T356 to Castlemaine for restoration at the VGR for future use on the railway. On the same day, Y133 was transferred to Melbourne for repairs.

18 August 2018: In conjunction with Steamrail's Maldon weekender. K153, J549 and K190 hauled one of the largest and heaviest trains to run on the VGR. With 6 sleeping carriages, a power van, water gin, Lowanna, the VGR 4 wheel goods set and Y133 hauled dead. This was the first triple header on the VGR in over 10 years.

22 August 2026: After a 14 year long absence, K160 returned to the VGR following a major overhaul at Newport Workshops on a Steamrail Victoria tour accompanied by K183 on its first visit to the VGR since it was restored in 1992. At Castlemaine, Y133 joined the 10 carriage train to form a rare triple header to Maldon and return.

== Maldon station fire ==
On the night of 20 October 2009, a large fire in the Maldon station building caused major damage and loss of equipment. However, the brickwork structure was deemed safe and work on a contract initiated by VicTrack to completely rebuild the roof was started in February 2011, leading to VGR re-occupying the building the following June.

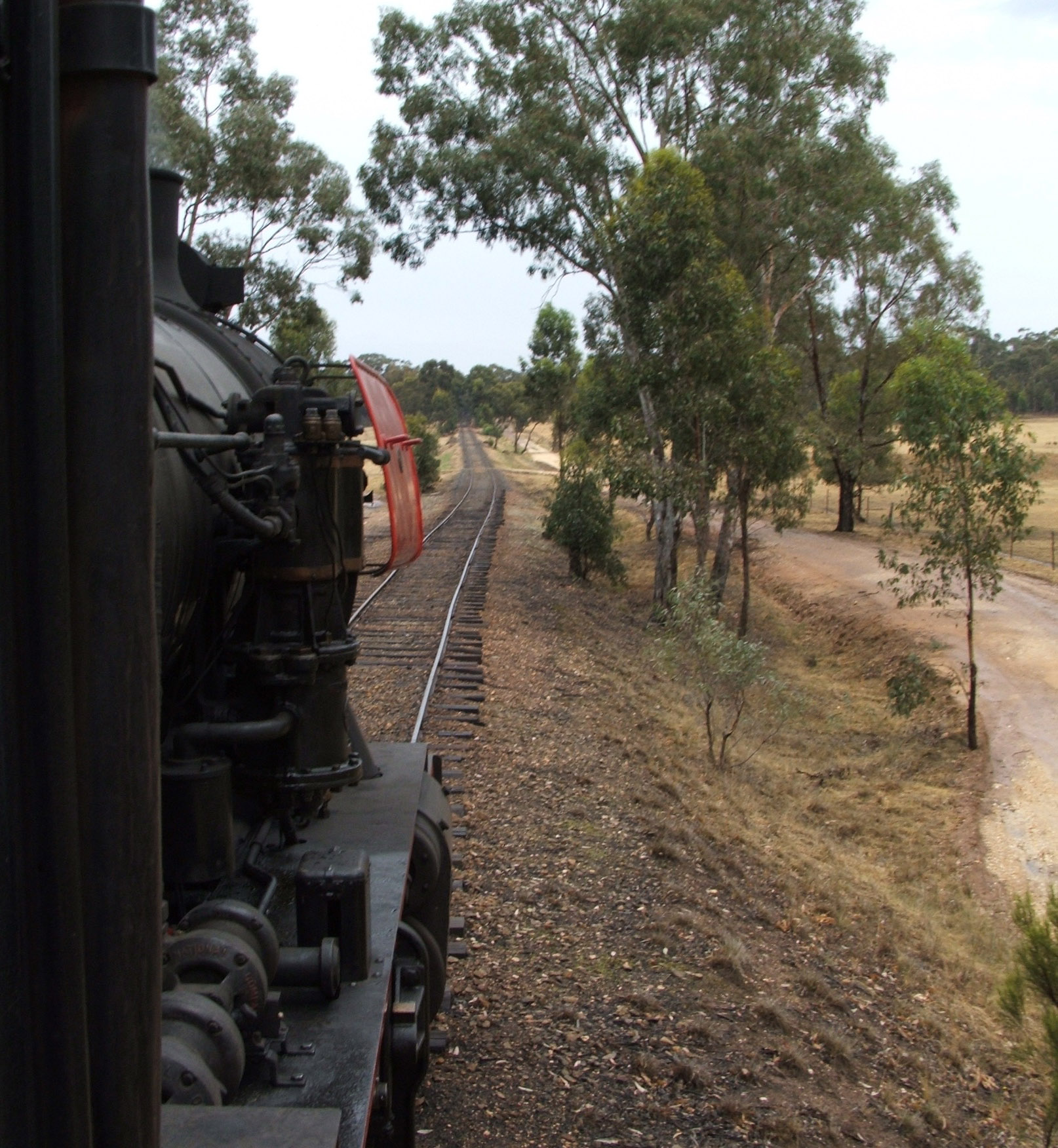
J 515 heading for Maldon station, as seen from the fireman's side window
