= Muckleford, Victoria =

Muckleford
- Town
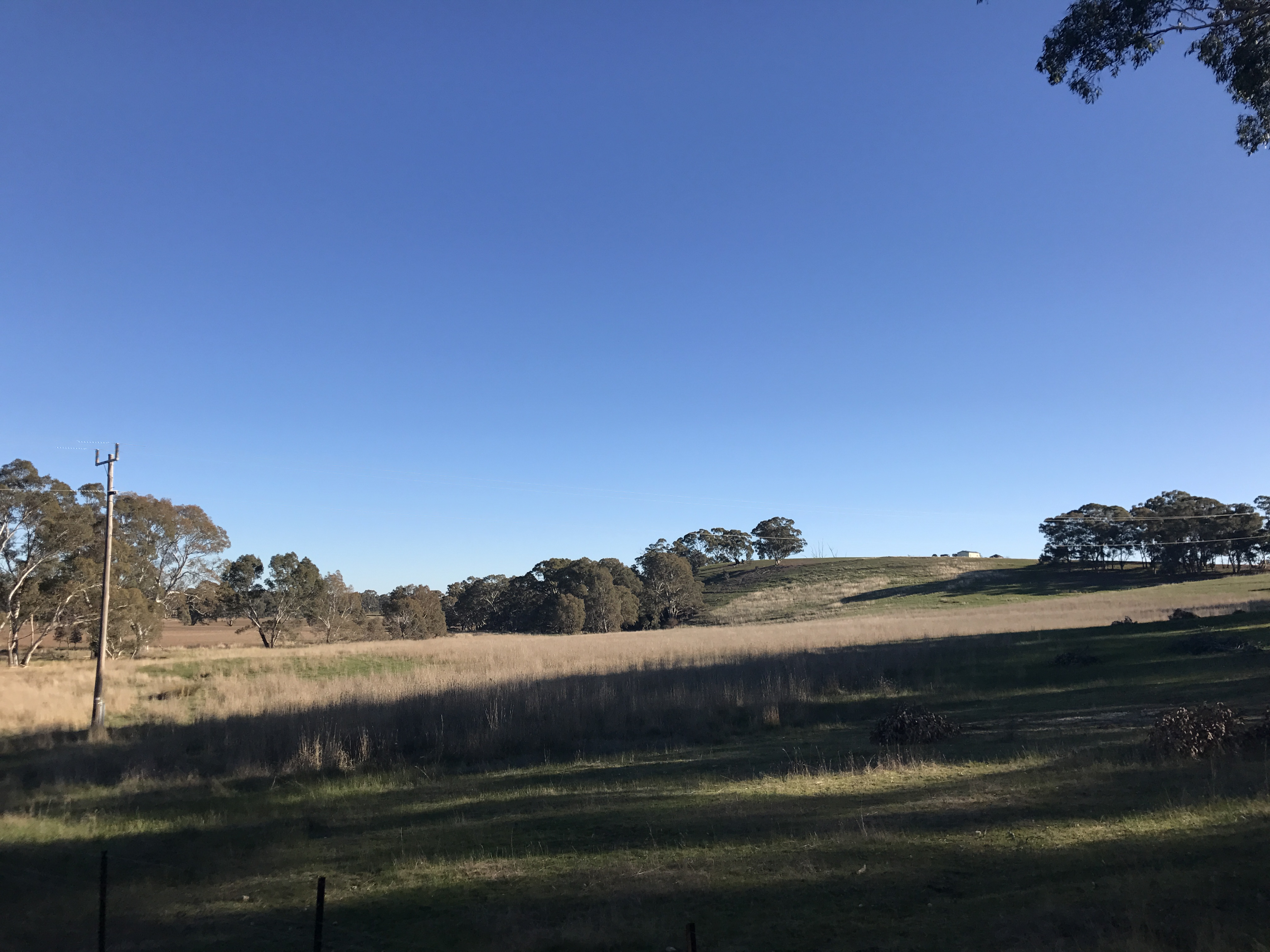
- Muckleford hills, from Rilens Road, 2017

- Coordinates: 37°01′S 144°09′E
- Country: Australia
- State: Victoria
- LGA: Shire of Mount Alexander
- Location: 127 km (79 mi) from Melbourne; 35 km (22 mi) from Bendigo; 7 km (4.3 mi) from Castlemaine

Government
  - State electorate: Bendigo West
  - Federal division: Bendigo

Population
  - Total: 405 (2016 census)

Muckleford is a locality in central Victoria, Australia. The area, also known as Wattle Flat, lies along the Muckleford Creek, a minor tributary of the Loddon River, approximately 127 kilometres north-west of the Melbourne city centre, and within the jurisdiction of the Mount Alexander Shire council. The nearest sizeable town is Castlemaine, approximately 7 km to the east. The original township is named after the English hamlet of the same name in Dorset, UK.

== Geography ==
The region is characterised by gently undulating terrain featuring several farms and smaller rural properties. Formed over millions of years, the land contains many types of quartz sand, gravel and clay, with more fertile alluvial deposits along the Muckleford Creek valley. Muckleford Creek rises below Walmer and eventually flows into the Loddon River. For much of the year, the area experiences relatively dry conditions, more suited to sheep farming than dairying.

The land to the west of Muckleford is characterised by sparse eucalypt forest of box ironbark, some areas of which were mined for gold in during the 19th century. This western forest has many remnants of mining activity, including several open and covered mine shafts, and a poppet head which was part of the "Red White and Blue" mine.

Muckleford is crossed by several roads. Rilens Road, surfaced with yellow gravel, used to have a single telephone wire raised on wooden poles on its north side, which served local farms and houses. The road runs west from the Pyrenees Highway (Route B180), and crosses the Muckleford-Walmer Road, which runs north to south. It crosses the Muckleford Creek, and then passes through a thin eucalypt forest. Along the Muckleford-Walmer Road are several farms, a disused red brick church, and the Muckleford Cemetery.

The Pyrenees Highway connects Castlemaine to Newstead. The Maldon to Castlemaine road runs chiefly west to east, cutting through the Muckleford region. Adjacent to the Castlemaine Golf Club is the Castlemaine Steiner School and Kindergarten, which was founded in 1987.

In the 2006 census, the Muckleford area had a population of 1107. Ten years later, in 2016, that number had fallen to 405 and the median age of the local population was 47 years.

== History ==
The original inhabitants of the area were the Dja Dja Wurrung people, who followed a generally nomadic lifestyle. One of the first Europeans in the area was the explorer Major Thomas Mitchell, who travelled through in the spring of 1836 while undertaking the exploration of what he called "Australia Felix". Squatters arrived a few years later and established a handful of "runs". Formal pastoral leases became available during the late 1840s.

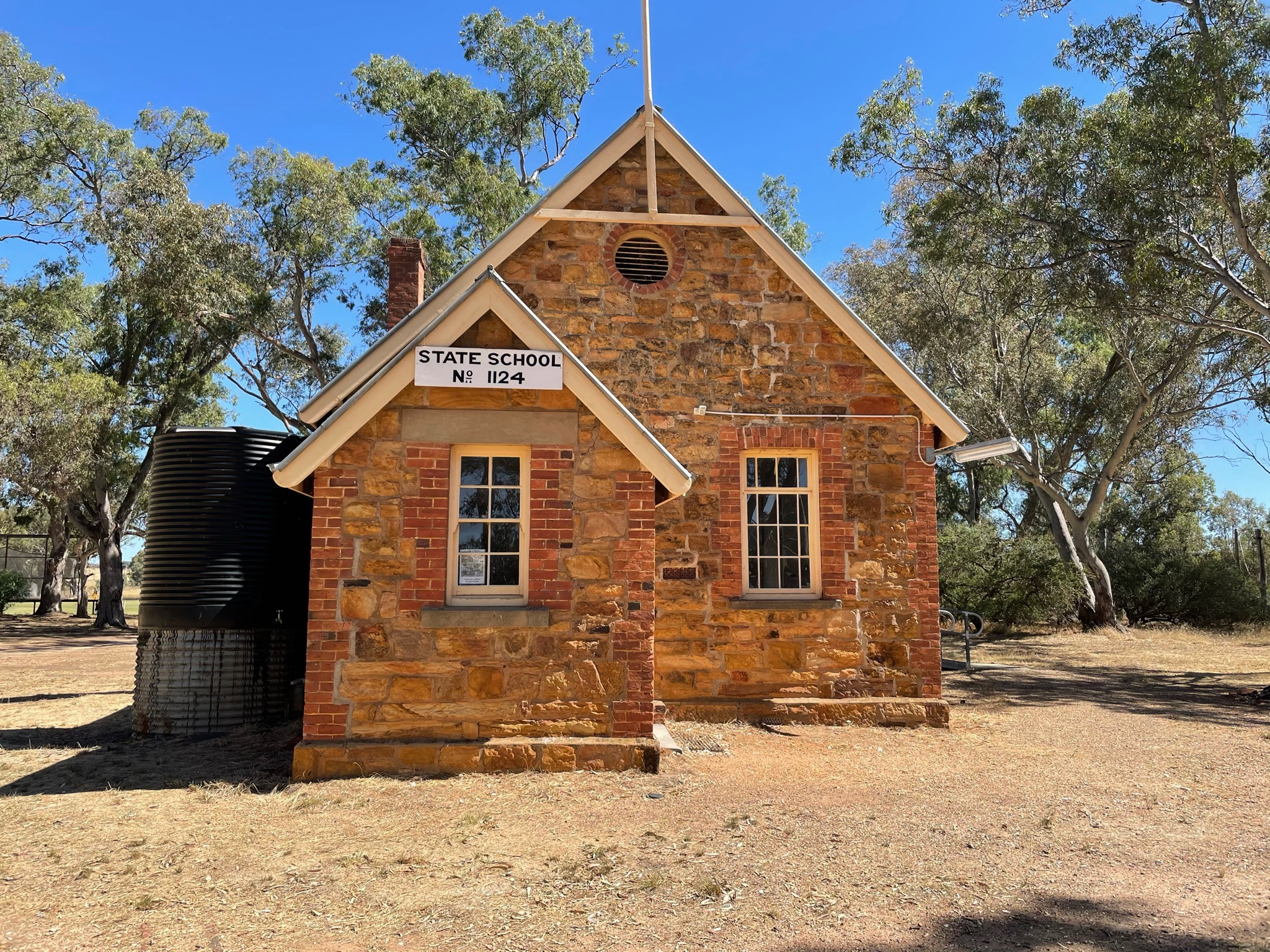
Former South Muckleford State School, 2021

There was no major development in the area until the early 1850s when there was a series of small gold rushes near Muckleford Creek and Wattle Flat, and a small town quickly sprung up in the vicinity of the Maldon to Castlemaine Road and Muckleford Creek crossing. The town served the needs of the prospectors, and the population rose quickly to over 2000 people. Within a year, hotels such as Monk's, Simson's and the Orrville had opened to quench the thirst of the miners.

A small Anglican school was opened at North Muckleford to educate the children of the diggings. It remained open until 1877. 1871 saw the opening of a government primary school, South Muckleford State School (No 1124). The school was closed in 1927 and the building is now used as a hall. Muckleford post office was opened on 1 August 1857 and was closed in 1966.

In 1884, Muckleford railway station was opened to the north of the township, on the Castlemaine to Maldon branch line. The station, along with a large goods shed, has been restored, and forms part of the Victorian Goldfields Railway. In early 2017, the railway was used at least twice a week, with steam-hauled trains stopping at Muckleford station. The service has become a major tourist attraction in the area.

For almost a decade before 2015, the area experienced severe drought conditions and some of the smaller creeks ran dry for several years.

== Public facilities ==
In 1995, land was purchased on Rilens Road, near its intersection with the Pyrenees Highway, to establish the Castlemaine Steiner School and Kindergarten, catering for students from kindergarten to Year 8.

The Muckleford State Forest and recreation area incorporates mining relics, a picnic area, walking tracks, and native flora and fauna.

== Sport and recreation ==
The Muckleford Football Club won the 1910 Loddon Valley Football Association premiership. Muckleford FC also won the 1930 Castlemaine District Football Association premiership.

The Castlemaine Golf Club has an 18-hole golf course. It is set in natural bushland at the intersection of Rilens Road and the Pyrenees Highway, with nine holes on each side of the sealed road. The clubhouse is available for functions.

== Web sites ==
- https://whilewaitingforgodot.net/2017/06/26/muckleford-south-primary-school/ Muckleford State School
- https://ccmaps.au/muckleford/muckleford.htm Muckleford Forest
- monumentaustralia.org.au Muckleford State School honour roll of the Great War
