= Eaglehawk railway station =

Railway station in Victoria, Australia

Eaglehawk
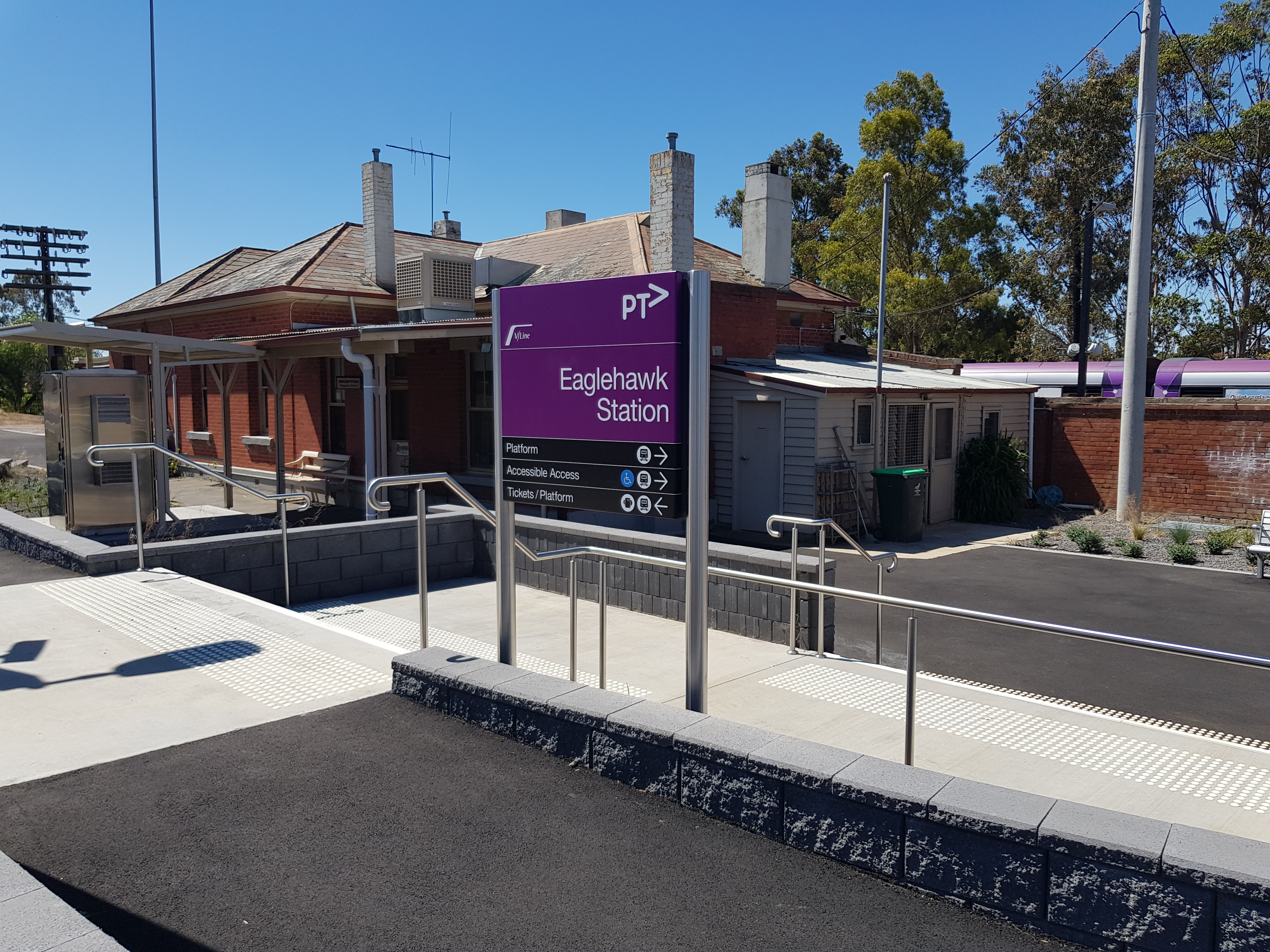
- Station forecourt, building and entrance, December 2020

General information
- Location: Hall Street, Eaglehawk, Victoria 3556; City of Greater Bendigo; Australia
- Coordinates: 36°43′06″S 144°14′52″E
- System: PTV regional rail station
- Owner: VicTrack
- Operator: V/Line
- Lines: Bendigo Swan Hill (Piangil); Eaglehawk–Inglewood
- Distance: 170.11 kilometres from Southern Cross
- Platforms: 1
- Tracks: 1
- Connections: Coach

Construction
- Structure type: At-grade
- Parking: Yes
- Cycle facilities: Yes
- Accessible: Yes

Other information
- Status: Operational, unstaffed
- Station code: EAG
- Fare zone: Myki zone 13
- Website: Public Transport Victoria

History
- Opened: 19 September 1876; 149 years ago

Services
Bendigo line: 3 weekday services to Melbourne.
Swan Hill line: 2 daily services in both directions.
Preceding station	V/Line	Following station
Bendigo towards Southern Cross	Bendigo line Weekdays only	Terminus
Bendigo towards Southern Cross	Swan Hill line	Raywood towards Swan Hill
Former services
Preceding station	Disused railways	Following station
Inglewood	Eaglehawk–Inglewood line	Terminus
Location
- Location within Victoria

Eaglehawk railway station is located on the Piangil line in Victoria, Australia. It serves the north-western Bendigo suburb of Eaglehawk, and it opened on 19 September 1876.

A pedestrian subway once existed at the up end of the station, until it was filled in and replaced with a pedestrian crossing in 1967.

The Eaglehawk–Kerang electric staff section was replaced with staff and ticket in 1987. In 1989, the signal box, interlocking and goods yard at the station was abolished. A former goods shed and a small disused platform is located opposite the station.

In 2020, the station underwent a refurbishment, including new car park spaces and drop-off zones, an upgraded forecourt and an extension to the platform at the up end of the station.

Located approximately 1 km west of the station is the junction of the Piangil line and the disused Eaglehawk–Inglewood line.

== Platforms and services ==
Eaglehawk has one platform. It is serviced by terminating V/Line Bendigo line services from Southern Cross, and through Swan Hill line services between Swan Hill and Southern Cross.

Eaglehawk platform arrangement
Platform	Line	Destination	Via	Notes	Source
1	Bendigo line	Southern Cross	Bendigo	Weekdays only.	
1	Bendigo line Swan Hill line	Southern Cross, Swan Hill	Bendigo		

== Transport links ==
Eaglehawk is served by V/Line Bendigo – Swan Hill and Mildura road coach services.

== Gallery ==
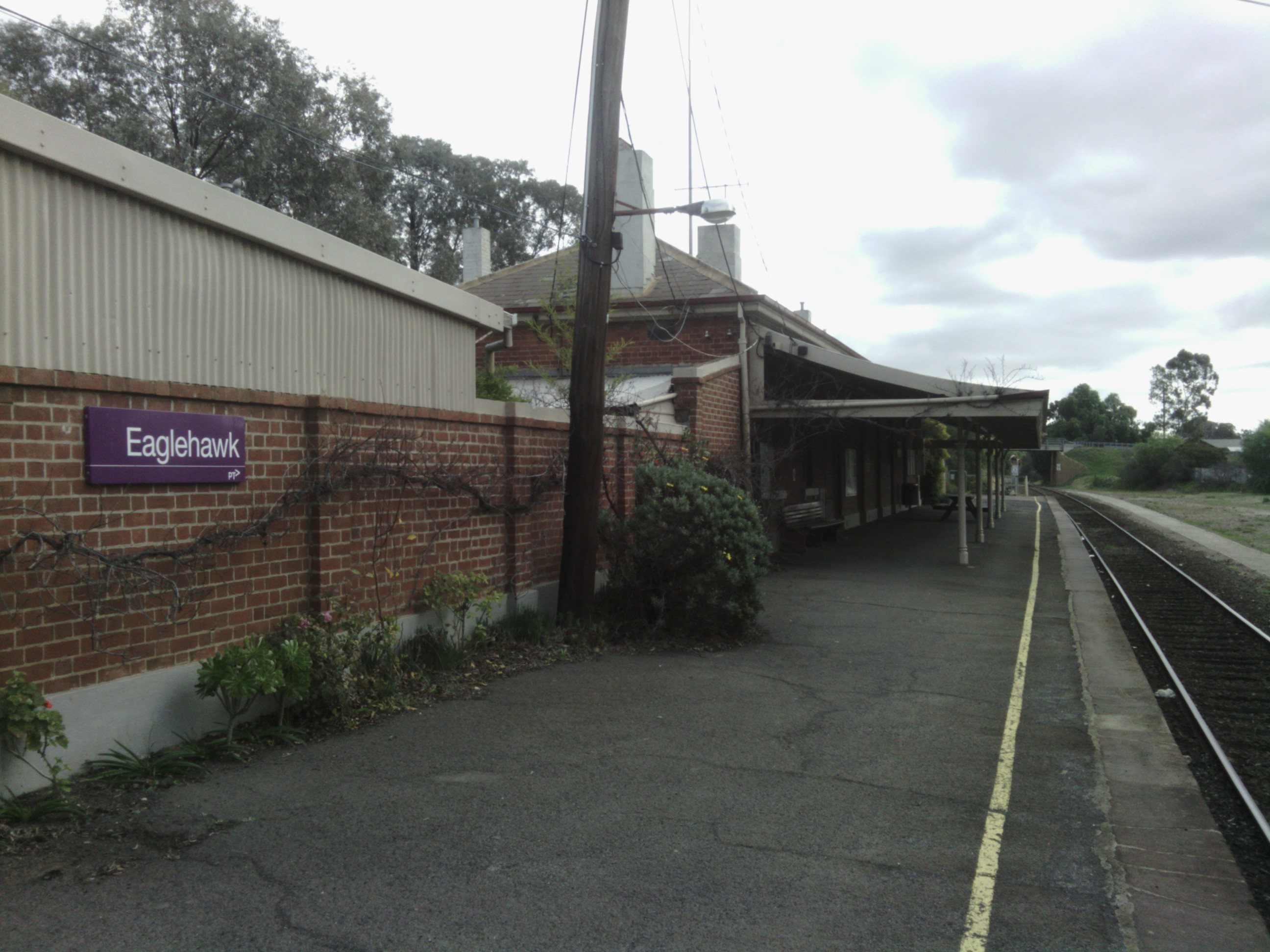
Westbound view from platform looking at station building, June 2015
