= Bendigo line =

Passenger rail service in Victoria, Australia

Bendigo

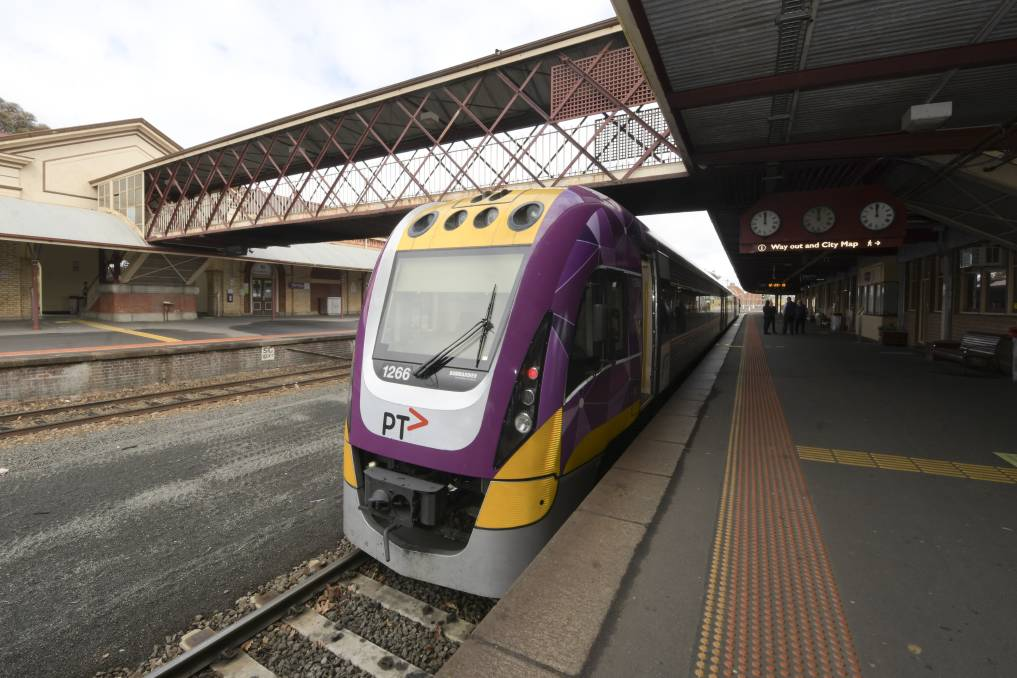
- VLocity VL66 at Bendigo railway station, October 2020

Overview
- Service type: Regional rail
- Status: Operational
- Locale: Victoria, Australia
- Current operator: V/Line
- Ridership: 2.06 million (2022-23)

Route
- Termini: Southern Cross; Bendigo Epsom Eaglehawk
- Stops: 14
- Distance travelled: 172.1 km (106.9 mi)
- Average journey time: 2 hours
- Service frequency: 12–43 minutes weekdays peak; 60 minutes weekdays off-peak (limited services at Malmsbury, Macedon, Riddells Creek and Clarkefield in the afternoon); 60 minutes weekends; Some services provided by Echuca services
- Line used: Deniliquin

On-board services
- Class: Economy
- Disabled access: Yes
- Catering facilities: None

Technical
- Rolling stock: VLocity
- Track gauge: 1,600 mm (5 ft 3 in)
- Electrification: None
- Operating speed: 160 km/h (99 mph)
- Track owner: VicTrack

Echuca
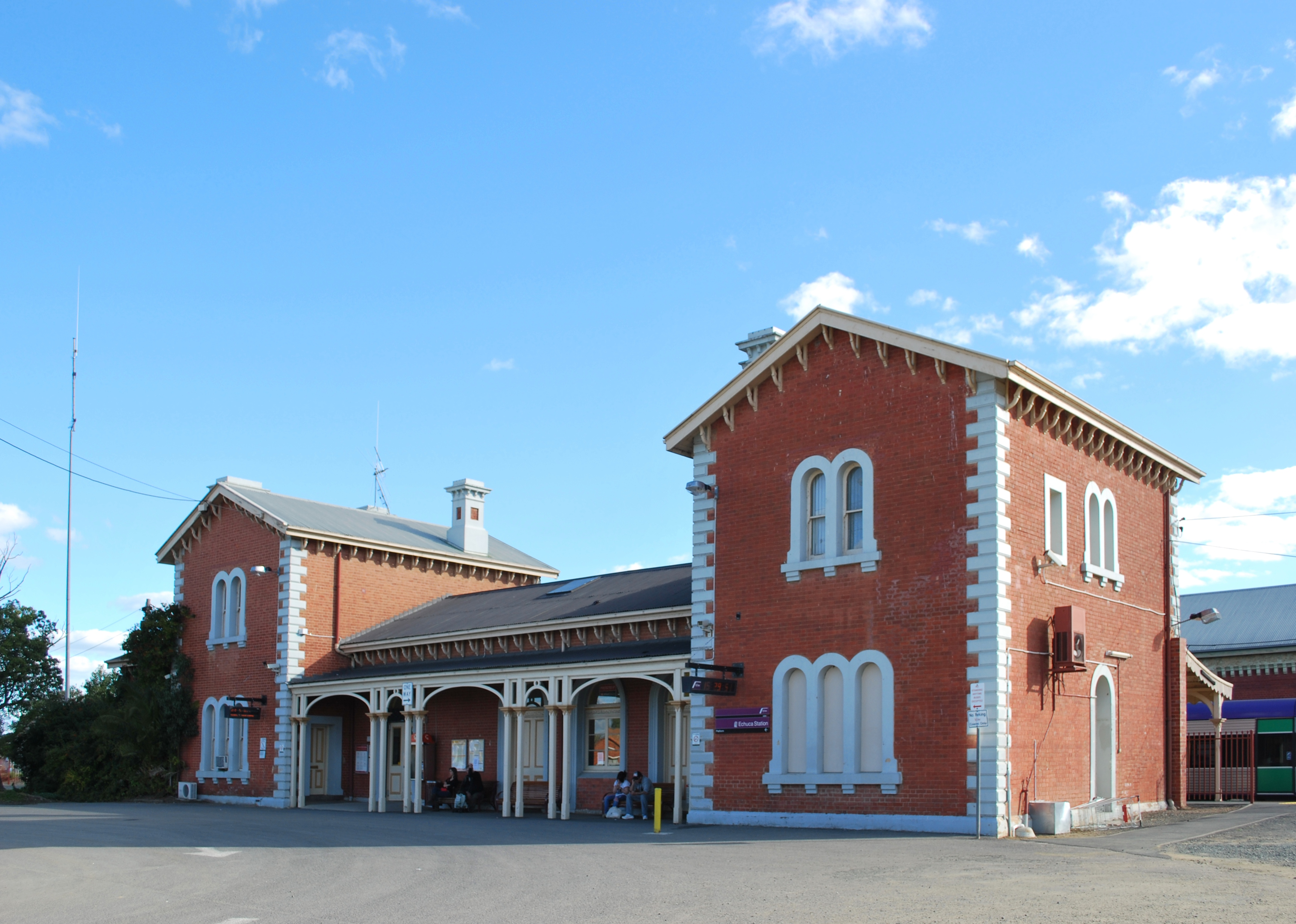
- Echuca Station

Overview
- Service type: Long-distance (paper ticket) service
- Status: Operational
- Locale: Victoria, Australia
- Current operator: V/Line

Route
- Termini: Southern Cross: Epsom; Echuca
- Stops: 18
- Distance travelled: 306.146 km (190.230 mi)
- Average journey time: 3 hours 17 minutes
- Service frequency: 3 service weekdays, 2 services weekends in each direction
- Line used: Deniliquin

On-board services
- Catering facilities: No

Technical
- Rolling stock: VLocity
- Track gauge: 1,600 mm (5 ft 3 in)
- Electrification: None
- Track owner: VicTrack

Swan Hill
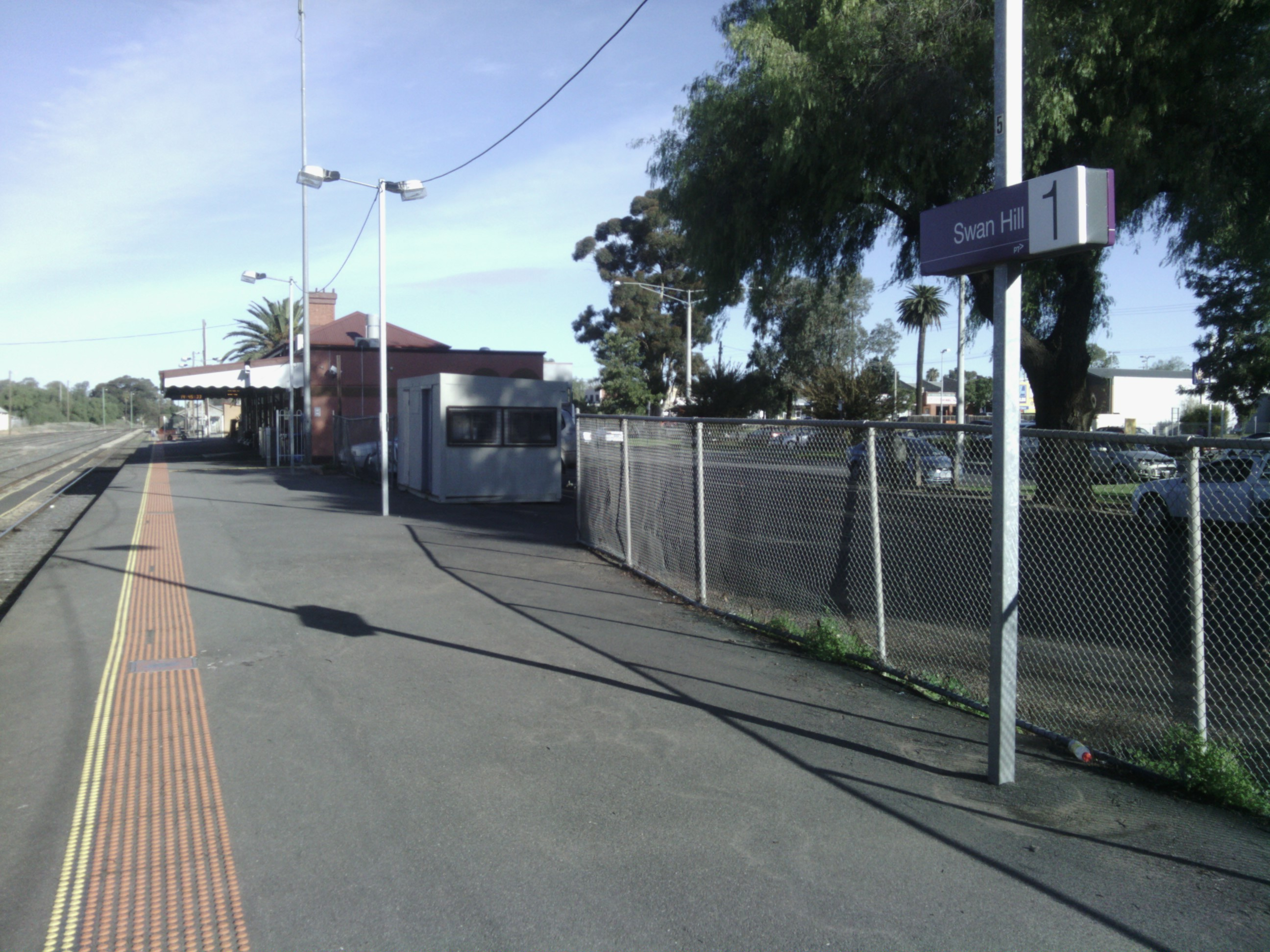
- Platform at Swan Hill

Overview
- Service type: Long-distance (paper ticket) service
- Status: Operational
- Locale: Victoria, Australia
- Current operator: V/Line

Route
- Termini: Swan Hill; Southern Cross
- Stops: 15
- Distance travelled: 347.3 km (215.8 mi)
- Average journey time: 4 hours 40 minutes
- Service frequency: 2 return services daily
- Line used: Piangil

On-board services
- Classes: First and economy
- Disabled access: No
- Seating arrangements: Yes
- Catering facilities: Yes

Technical
- Rolling stock: N Class locomotives N-Type carriages
- Track gauge: 1,600 mm (5 ft 3 in)
- Electrification: None
- Operating speed: 65km/h at North Bendigo Junction – Eaglehawk; 80km/h at North Bendigo Junction – Bendigo and (Swan Hill) Bryan Street PCR – Swan Hill Station; 90km/h Victoria Street PCR (Kerang) – Bryan Street PCR (Swan Hill); 100km/h Eaglehawk – Wellington Street PCR (Kerang)
- Track owner: VicTrack

The Bendigo line is a regional passenger rail service operated by V/Line in Victoria, Australia. It serves 14 stations towards its terminus in the regional city of Bendigo. It is the third most-used regional rail service in Victoria (behind the Ballarat and Geelong services), carrying 2.06 million passengers in the 2022-23 financial year.

Beyond Bendigo, the Echuca line continues north-east to Echuca via Epsom; and the Swan Hill line continues north-west to Swan Hill via Eaglehawk. Services are operated to Bendigo and Echuca primarily using V/Line VLocity diesel multiple unit sets in either 3- or 6-car configurations; V/Line N class loco-hauled services run to Swan Hill, with a mixture of N type carriages and Z type carriages.

== History ==
=== 19th and 20th centuries ===
In the 1850s, the Melbourne, Mount Alexander and Murray River Railway Company began building a line between Melbourne to Bendigo, but ran into financial difficulties and, in 1856, was sold to the Victorian government, which finished the double-track line in 1862. Throughout the early 20th century, many branch lines were built along the length of the Bendigo line, but by the time V/Line took over Victorian regional passenger services in 1983, the only passengers services still using the Bendigo corridor were the Bendigo and Swan Hill intercity services. A twice-weekly passenger service to Echuca from Melbourne via Bendigo was reinstated in 1996.

As at 1987 V/Line had considered and rejected proposals to convert the line from double to single track, on the grounds that the reduced cost in track maintenance would be exceeded by the increased costs of signalling arrangements to manage bidirectional traffic flow. However, it was projected that the "low density section between Castlemaine and Kyneton" would eventually be singled.

=== 21st century ===
==== Regional Fast Rail ====
As part of the Regional Fast Rail project, which was completed in 2006, the Bendigo line underwent major track upgrades that would allow for V/Line VLocity diesel multiple unit trains to be introduced to the line, running at speeds of up to 160km/h between Sunbury and Bendigo. Controversially, between Kyneton and Bendigo the line was singled, officially to allow for better clearance past heritage structures, although some double-track sections were retained, effectively creating long crossing loops. Those sections of track were provided with bi-directional signalling, but only the main running line was upgraded for high-speed running.

==== Sunbury line electrification ====
In 2012, electrification on the line was extended from Sydenham (now Watergardens) to Sunbury along the V/Line tracks. This caused some controversy among frequent users of V/Line's Bendigo services who claimed it would cause extra congestion, slowing down the Bendigo service. Ian Dobbs, then head of Public Transport Victoria acknowledged this issue, stating that "there's a slight slow-down of services on that particular corridor with this timetable, because we're putting more Metro services in the mix."

==== Regional Rail Link ====
In 2008, the Regional Rail Link project was announced. Finished in 2015, it consists of a new pair of tracks exclusively for V/Line services, avoiding the need to share tracks with Metro's electrified suburban services. The tracks begin west of Werribee, following an alignment up to Deer Park, then running into two new platforms at Southern Cross, completely bypassing Tottenham, West Footscray, Middle Footscray, South Kensington, and North Melbourne; but still including stops at Sunshine and Footscray at two platforms dedicated to V/Line services. All current timetabled Bendigo services run express through Sunshine.

The main benefit of the project was for the Geelong line service, which used to run along the same tracks as Metro's Werribee line, resulting in significant congestion. Ballarat and especially Bendigo services benefited less, only being separated from Metro's Sunbury line service between Sunshine and Southern Cross. While the project was overall well-received for increasing service reliability, the choice to bypass North Melbourne was especially criticised.

==== Bendigo Metro Rail ====
In 2014, Epsom Station was constructed to serve Bendigo's northern suburb of the same name. It was initially serviced four times daily by extending some services that terminated at Bendigo. In 2016, three services that would have terminated at Bendigo were extended to Eaglehawk Station, and all weekday services to Bendigo began to stop at Kangaroo Flat.

==== Regional Rail Revival ====
The Regional Rail Revival project primarily focused on upgrades to the Echuca and Swan Hill services. Three new stations were constructed: Goornong and Huntly on the Echuca line, and Raywood on the Swan Hill line. Tracks were upgraded to support the introduction of V/Line VLocity trains to Echuca, running up to 130 km/h between Bendigo and Goornong (up from 60 km/h), and 100 km/h the rest of the way to Echuca (up from 80 km/h), reducing the journey time by approximately 12 minutes. 10 level crossings towards Eaglehawk were upgraded, improving safety and reliability.

== Services ==
Trains operate approximately once an hour between Southern Cross and Bendigo every day, with some services originating or terminating at Epsom or Eaglehawk. Bendigo services share tracks with all of Metro's Sunbury line stations, but they run express through all of them except Footscray and either Watergardens or Sunbury − the only service to stop at both is the 06:20 service from Eaglehawk to Southern Cross.

Services to Echuca run three times a day on weekdays, and twice a day on weekends. The 11:06 weekday service from Southern Cross is timetabled as a shuttle service that terminates at Bendigo, then forms the Echuca service approximately 13 minutes later. There are two services to Swan Hill every day, one in the morning and one in the evening.

Services to Bendigo and Echuca are currently run by V/Line VLocity trains, while the classic V/Line N class locomotives are used for Swan Hill services, with N type and Z type carriages.

== Infrastructure ==
The entire line to Bendigo was originally constructed as double-track. As part of the Regional Fast Rail project, sections of the line were singled in 2006: the line is currently double-track to Kyneton, then single-track with crossing loops the rest of the route to Bendigo, Echuca, and Swan Hill.

== Gallery ==
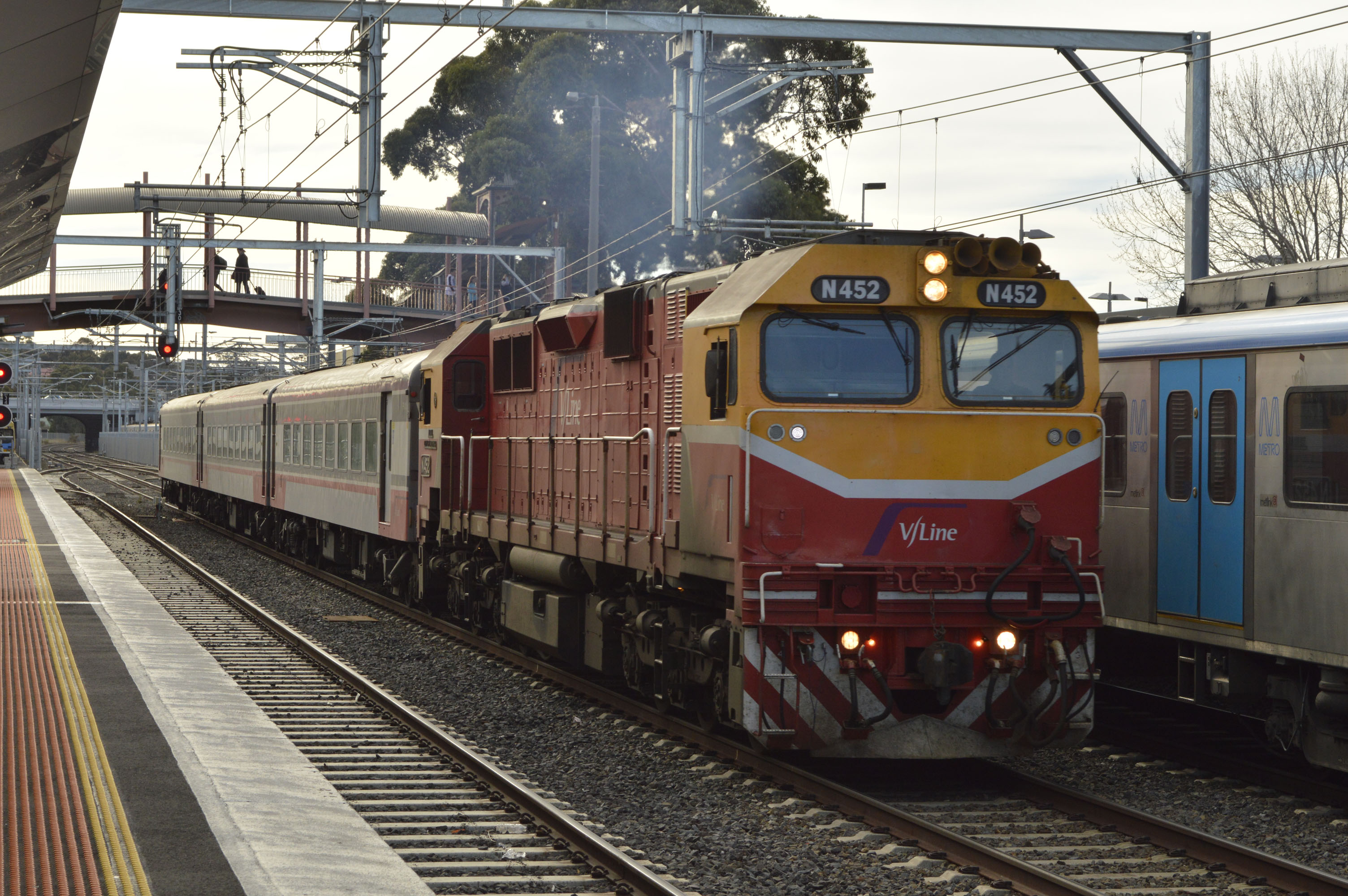
V/Line N class N452 running through Sunbury

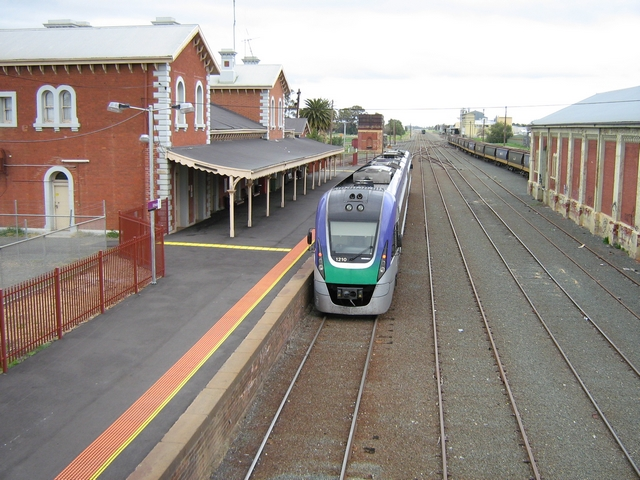
A V/Line VLocity at Echuca

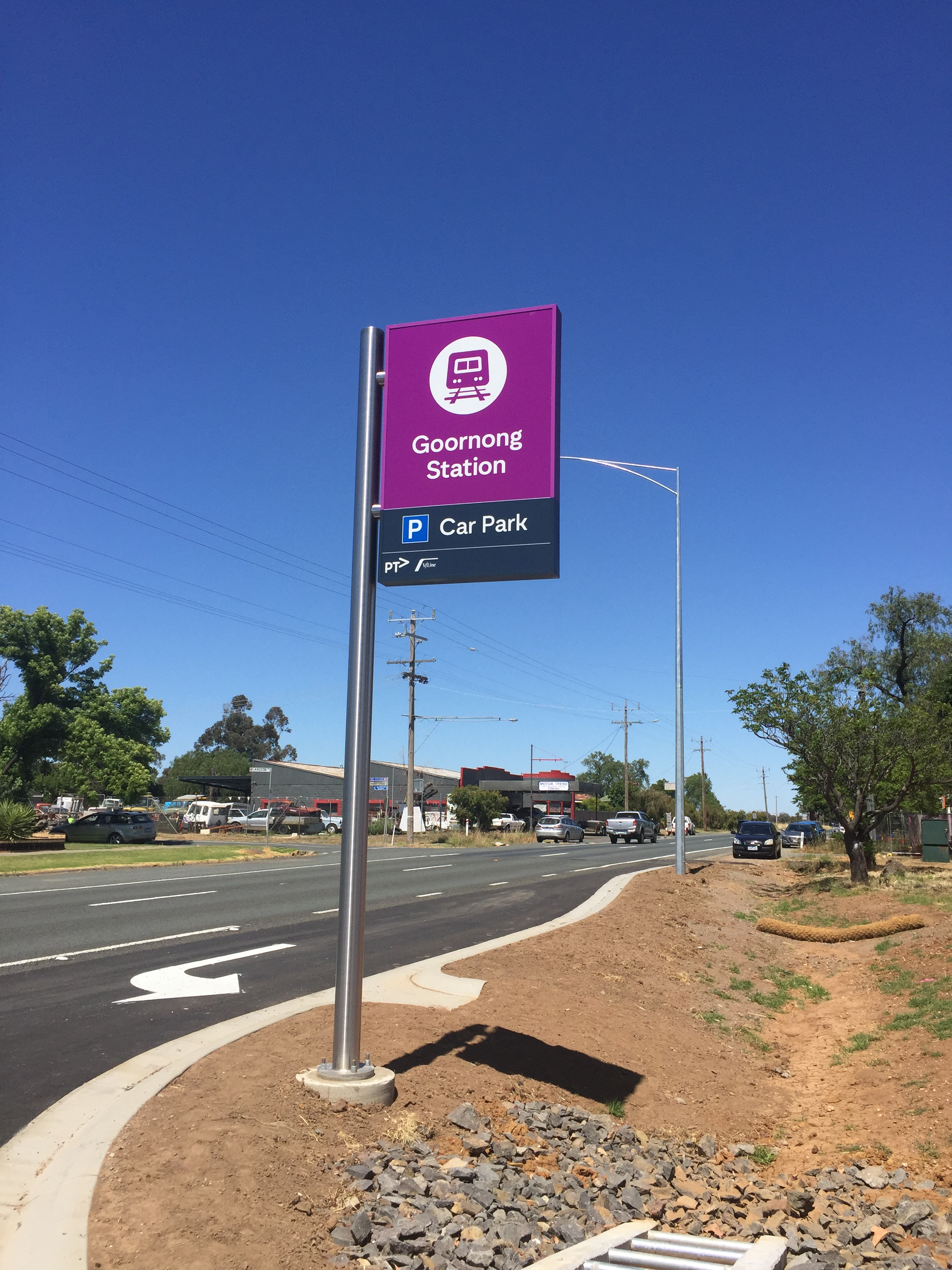
Station sign at Goornong

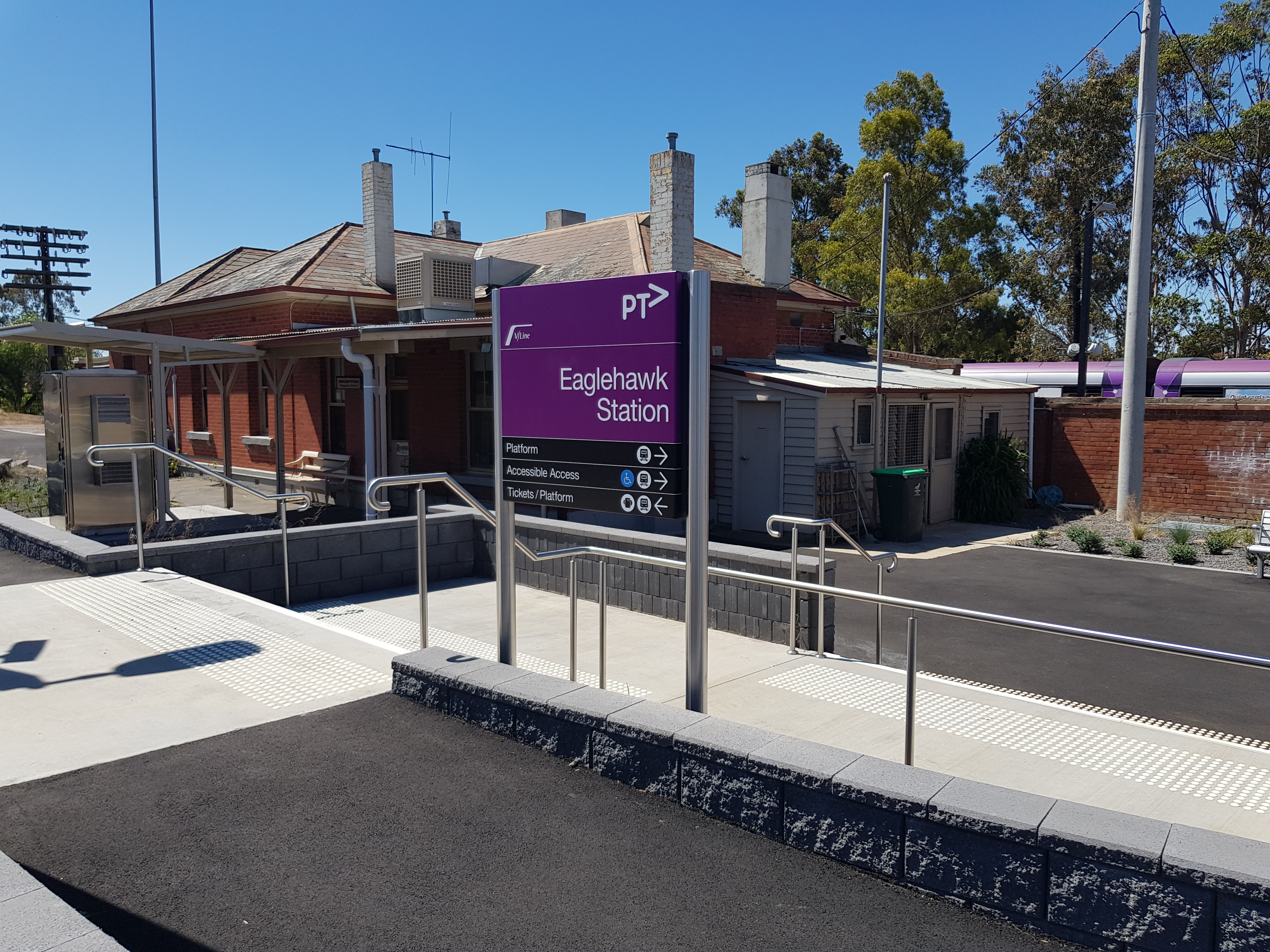
Eaglehawk railway station entrance
