= Southern Cross railway station =

Railway station in Melbourne, Australia

Southern Cross
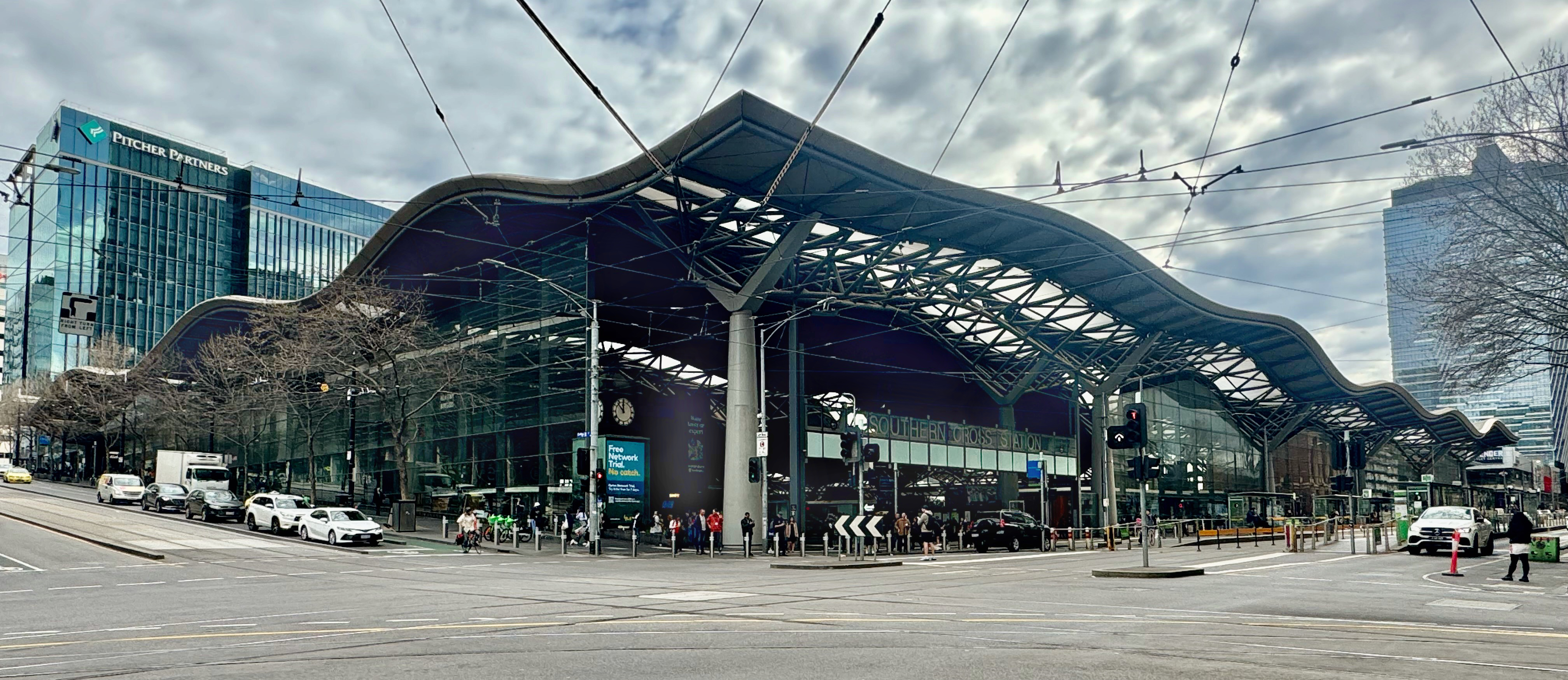
- Main entrance to the station on the corner of Collins and Spencer Streets, August 2024

General information
- Location: Spencer Street, Melbourne, Victoria, Australia
- Coordinates: 37°49′06″S 144°57′09″E
- System: Inter-city, regional and commuter rail station
- Owner: IFM Investors
- Operator: Civic Nexus
- Lines: Metropolitan: Mernda Hurstbridge; Lilydale Belgrave Alamein (Note: Weekday pre-peak and post-peak only); Glen Waverley; Craigieburn Upfield; Flemington Racecourse (Note: Special events only); Frankston; Werribee Williamstown; Regional: Seymour Shepparton (Tocumwal); Ballarat Ararat Maryborough Geelong Warrnambool (Ararat); Bendigo Echuca Swan Hill (Deniliquin and Piangil); Gippsland (Gippsland); Interstate: Southern (North East); The Overland (Western SG); Albury
- Platforms: 16
- Tracks: 22
- Train operators: Metro Trains; V/Line; NSW TrainLink; Journey Beyond
- Connections: Bus; Tram; Coach; SkyBus; NSW Coach

Construction
- Structure type: Ground level with mezzanine
- Cycle facilities: 12
- Accessible: Yes: step-free access

Other information
- Status: Premium station
- Station code: SSS
- Fare zone: Myki zone 1
- Website: Southern Cross Station Pty Ltd Public Transport Victoria

History
- Opened: 17 January 1859; 167 years ago
- Rebuilt: 1960s and 2000s
- Electrified: Platforms 8 to 14 only
- Former names: Spencer Street

Passengers
- 2019–2020: 19.967 million ▼23%
- 2020–2021: 6.653 million ▼67%
- 2021–2022: 8.905 million ▲34%
- 2022–2023: 15.635 million ▲76%
- 2023–2024: 20.161 million ▲29%
Services
| Preceding station | Metro Trains | Following station |
|---|---|---|
Direction of travel on metropolitan lines between stations on the City Loop changes to either Flinders Street or Flagstaff depending on the line and time of day.
| Flinders Street One-way operation | Mernda line | Flagstaff towards Mernda, Eltham or Hurstbridge via City Loop |
| Flinders Street One-way operation | Hurstbridge line | Flagstaff towards Mernda, Eltham or Hurstbridge via City Loop |
| Flinders Street towards Glen Waverley, Alamein, Blackburn, Belgrave or Lilydale | Alamein line Weekday peak hours only | Flagstaff towards Glen Waverley, Alamein, Blackburn, Belgrave or Lilydale via City Loop |
| Flinders Street towards Glen Waverley, Alamein, Blackburn, Belgrave or Lilydale | Belgrave line | Flagstaff towards Glen Waverley, Alamein, Blackburn, Belgrave or Lilydale via City Loop |
| Flinders Street towards Glen Waverley, Alamein, Blackburn, Belgrave or Lilydale | Glen Waverley line | Flagstaff towards Glen Waverley, Alamein, Blackburn, Belgrave or Lilydale via City Loop |
| Flinders Street towards Glen Waverley, Alamein, Blackburn, Belgrave or Lilydale | Lilydale line | Flagstaff towards Glen Waverley, Alamein, Blackburn, Belgrave or Lilydale via City Loop |
| Flinders Street towards Upfield or Craigieburn via City Loop | Craigieburn line | North Melbourne towards Upfield or Craigieburn |
| Flinders Street towards Upfield or Craigieburn via City Loop | Upfield line | North Melbourne towards Upfield or Craigieburn |
| Flinders Street towards Frankston | Frankston line | Flagstaff One-way operation |
| Flinders Street towards Sandringham | Werribee line | North Melbourne towards Williamstown or Werribee |
| Flinders Street towards Sandringham | Williamstown line | North Melbourne towards Williamstown or Werribee |
| Terminus | Flemington Racecourse line | North Melbourne towards Showgrounds or Flemington Racecourse |
| Flinders Street Terminus | Flemington Racecourse line | North Melbourne towards Showgrounds or Flemington Racecourse |
Regional and interstate services
| Preceding station | V/Line | Following station |
|---|---|---|
| Terminus | Albury line | Broadmeadows towards Albury |
| Terminus | Seymour line | North Melbourne towards Seymour or Shepparton |
| Terminus | Shepparton line | North Melbourne towards Seymour or Shepparton |
| Terminus | Geelong line | Footscray towards Wyndham Vale, Geelong, Waurn Ponds or Warrnambool |
| Terminus | Warrnambool line | Footscray towards Wyndham Vale, Geelong, Waurn Ponds or Warrnambool |
| Terminus | Melton line | Footscray towards Melton, Wendouree, Ararat or Maryborough |
| Terminus | Ballarat line | Footscray towards Melton, Wendouree, Ararat or Maryborough |
| Terminus | Ararat line | Footscray towards Melton, Wendouree, Ararat or Maryborough |
| Terminus | Maryborough line | Footscray towards Melton, Wendouree, Ararat or Maryborough |
| Terminus | Bendigo line | Footscray towards Kyneton, Bendigo, Swan Hill or Echuca |
| Terminus | Swan Hill line | Footscray towards Kyneton, Bendigo, Swan Hill or Echuca |
| Terminus | Echuca line | Footscray towards Kyneton, Bendigo, Swan Hill or Echuca |
| Flinders Street towards Traralgon or Bairnsdale | Gippsland line | Terminus |
| Preceding station | NSW TrainLink | Following station |
| Terminus | NSW TrainLink Southern Line Melbourne XPT | Broadmeadows towards Sydney |
| Preceding station | Journey Beyond | Following station |
| North Shore towards Adelaide | The Overland | Terminus |
Former services
| Preceding station | Metro Trains | Following station |
Pre 2026
| Flagstaff One-way operation | Cranbourne line | Flinders Street towards Cranbourne or East Pakenham |
| Flagstaff One-way operation | Pakenham line | Flinders Street towards Cranbourne or East Pakenham |
| North Melbourne towards Watergardens or Sunbury | Sunbury line | Flinders Street towards Watergardens or Sunbury via City Loop |
Pre 2021
| Flagstaff One-way operation | Sandringham line | Flinders Street towards Sandringham |
- Building details

General information
- Status: Completed
- Type: Railway station terminus
- Construction started: 2002
- Completed: 2006
- Cost: $700m

Height
- Height: 23 metres (75 ft)

Technical details
- Size: 60,000 square metres (650,000 sq ft)

Design and construction
- Architect: Nicholas Grimshaw
- Architecture firm: Grimshaw Architects; Jackson Architecture
- Developer: Civic Nexus consortium
- Engineer: WSP Global
- Awards: Royal Institute of British Architects' Lubetkin Prize – most outstanding building outside the European Union
Location

Southern Cross station (known as Spencer Street station until 2005) is a major railway station in Docklands, Melbourne. It is on Spencer Street, between Collins and La Trobe streets, at the western edge of the Melbourne central business district. The Docklands Stadium sports arena is 500 metres (550 yards) north-west of the station.

The station is owned, operated and maintained by Civic Nexus, a subsidiary of IFM Investors and operating as Southern Cross Station Pty Ltd, under a 30-year lease to 2036 from the Victorian State Government, as part of a public-private partnership. Southern Cross Station contracts Infranexus for management services. Infranexus is also wholly owned by IFM.

The station is the terminus of the state's regional railway network, operated by V/Line, The Overland rail service to Adelaide, and NSW TrainLink XPT services to Sydney. It is also served by metropolitan rail services, operated by Metro Trains, and connects with Flinders Street station and the underground City Loop. It is the second-busiest railway station in Melbourne's metropolitan network, with 14.019 million metropolitan passengers recorded in 2023/24 and 5.925 million regional passengers through the V/Line network.

Southern Cross also has a coach terminal underneath the Spencer Outlet shopping complex. SkyBus services to Melbourne Airport and since 2017 to Avalon Airport operate from there, as well as Firefly Express, Greyhound Australia and FlixBus interstate coach services, and V/Line coach services to Mildura, Yarram, Mansfield, and other parts of Victoria not served by rail.

== History ==
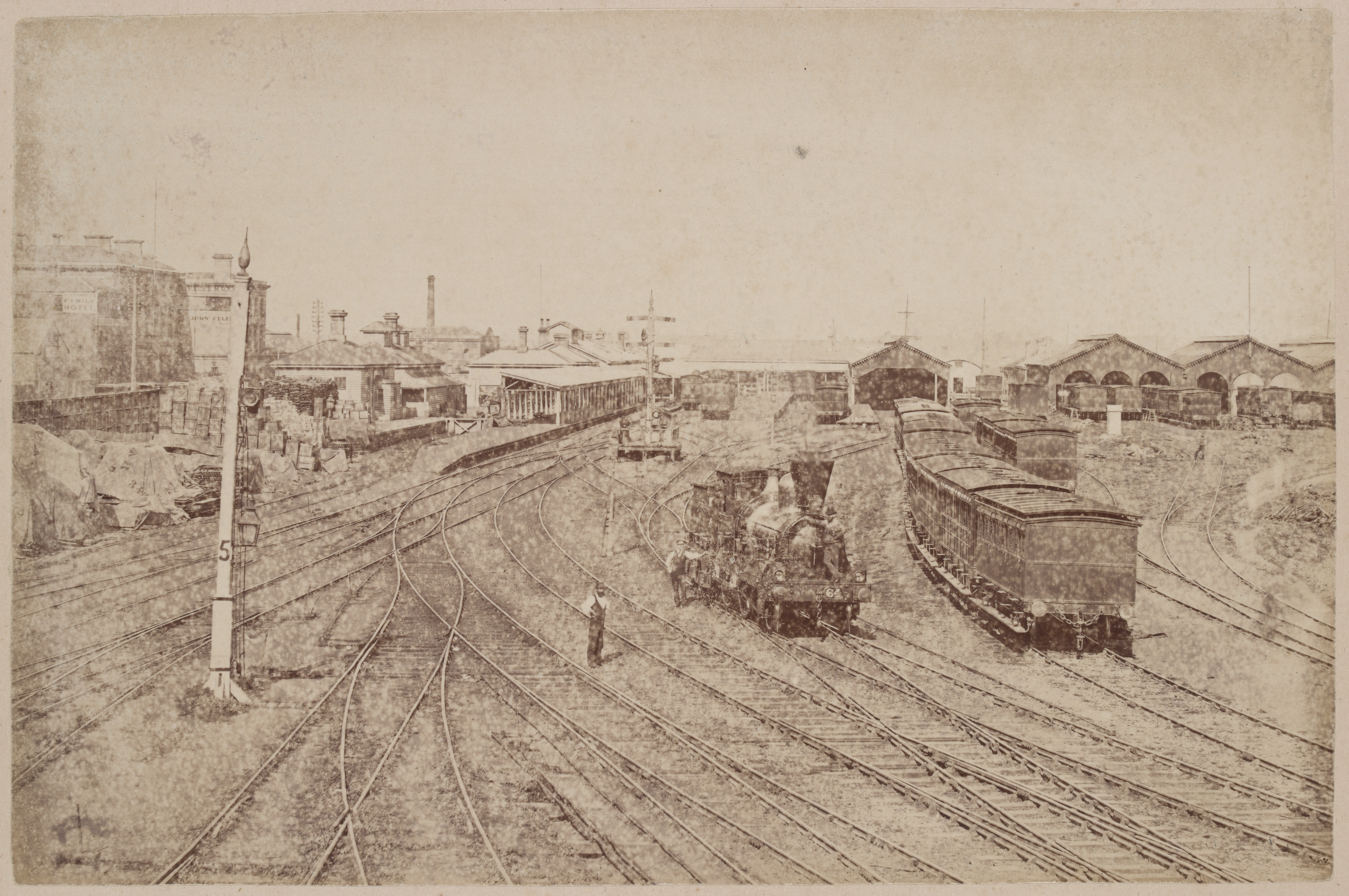
Spencer Street station platforms and goods sheds, c. 1885

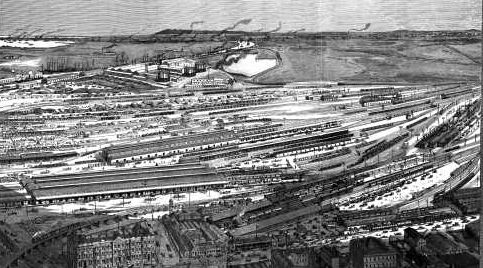
Lithograph of the busy station complex, looking west from the Hoddle Grid, 1889

Opened as Spencer Street station in 1859, five years after the other major Melbourne rail terminus at Flinders Street, the station was a dead-end terminus, running parallel to Spencer Street, composed of a single main platform with a dock platform at the north end. It was not until 1874 that an extra platform was provided.

The two major city stations were not linked until 1879, when a single-track ground-level line was opened. It operated only at night, and only for freight trains. In the 1880s, it was proposed that Spencer Street station be removed in order to facilitate the westward expansion of the city, but the plan was subsequently rejected.

=== 1880s: Passenger services commence ===
The 1880s saw the first of several grand but unrealised plans for the station. The first accepted design, drafted by Albert Charles Cook in 1883, was a fanciful Palladian palazzo design of two and three storeys, with a central portico.

In 1891, further plans were made for a significant new station complex, including three-storey office complex and dominant clock tower, reminiscent of the later Sydney Central station, but the 1890s depression put an end to such expensive schemes.

In 1938, it was announced that construction of an improved station entrance and new car park had been approved, designed by architects Messrs Stephenson and Meldrum, costing £2,000. Once again however, no construction took place.

=== 1960s: Modernisation ===
In 1960, work started on a new Spencer Street station, as part of the construction of a new interstate standard gauge line to Sydney, New South Wales. A station building was constructed which largely replaced the 1880s iron sheds, and a new 413-metre (1,355 ft) platform number 1 was built. The passenger subway which had been constructed as part of the 1918 works was extended to include access to country platforms.

In 1962, a separate subway network was constructed to carry mail between the station and what was then the Melbourne General Post Office and main postal sorting office, situated on the other side of Spencer Street.

By the end of February 1985, the Dudley Street carriage sheds were completely demolished.

==== History of Transport Mural ====
Artist Harold Freedman's 36.6-metre (120 ft 1 in) long and 7.32-metre (24 ft 0 in) high History of Transport mural featured above the main concourse of the Spencer Street station and was unveiled by the premier of Victoria on 30 January 1978. During radical redevelopment (2002–2006) Freedman's mural was removed, but due to bargaining by the CFMEU, it remains on display above shop-fronts in the adjacent retail centre, DFO.

=== 2000s: Redevelopment ===
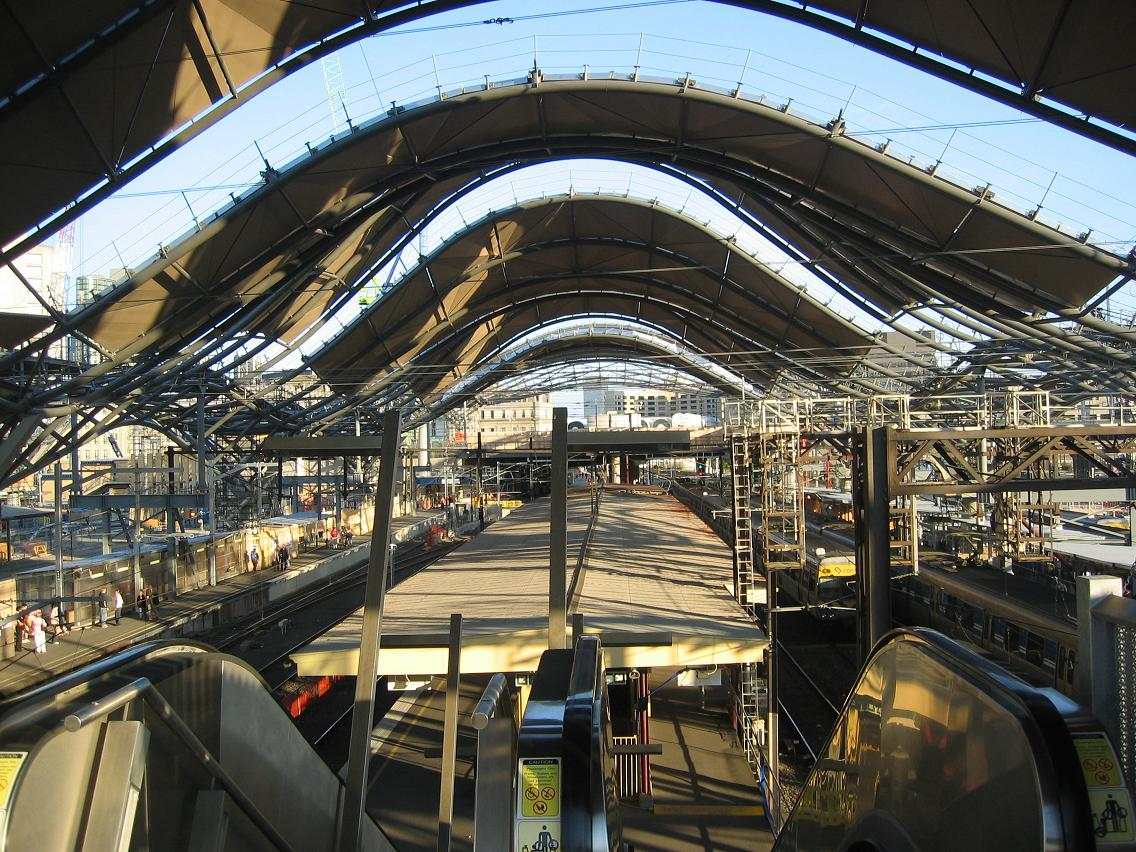
Works on the station, November 2004

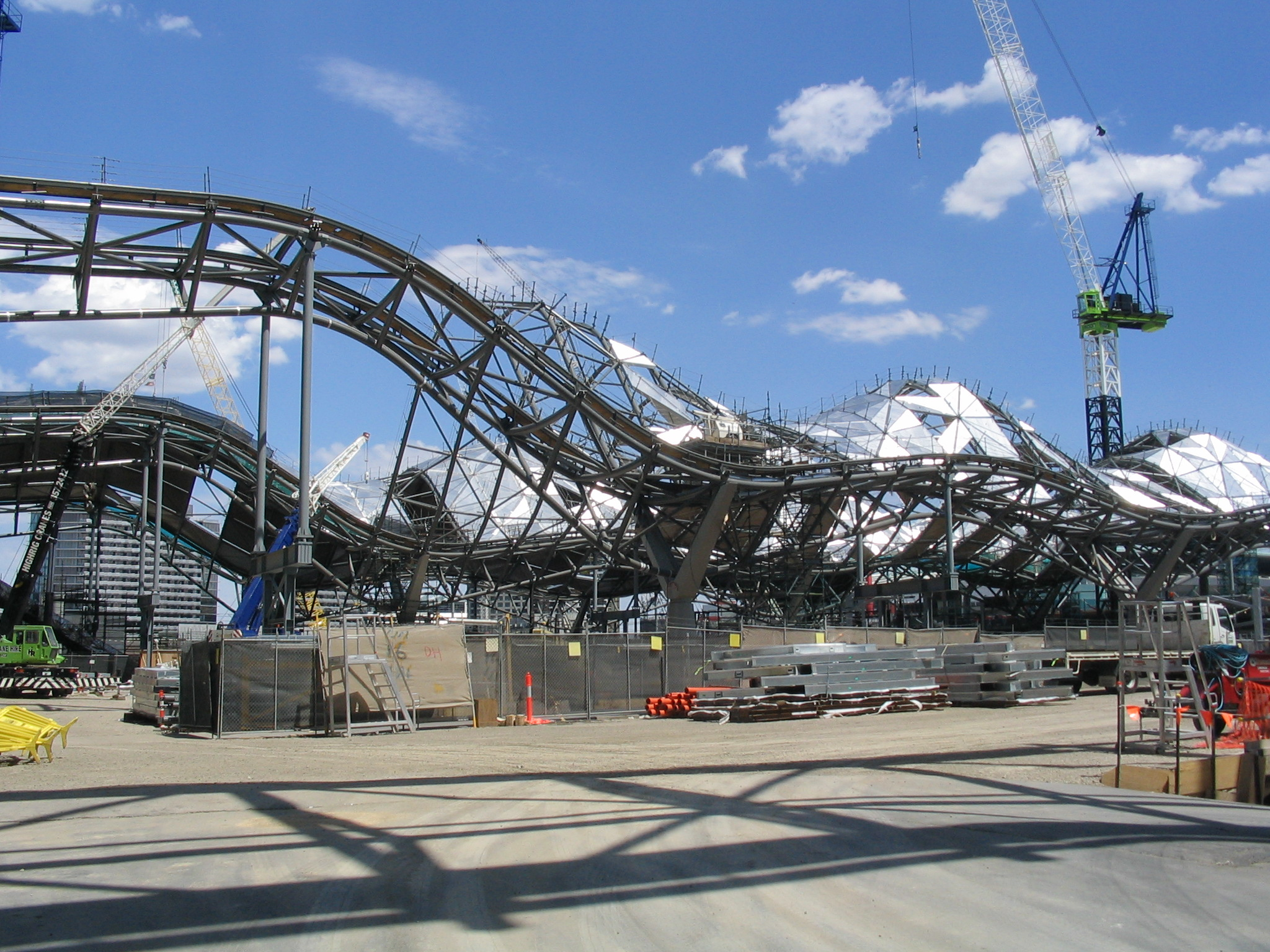
Works on the roof, January 2005

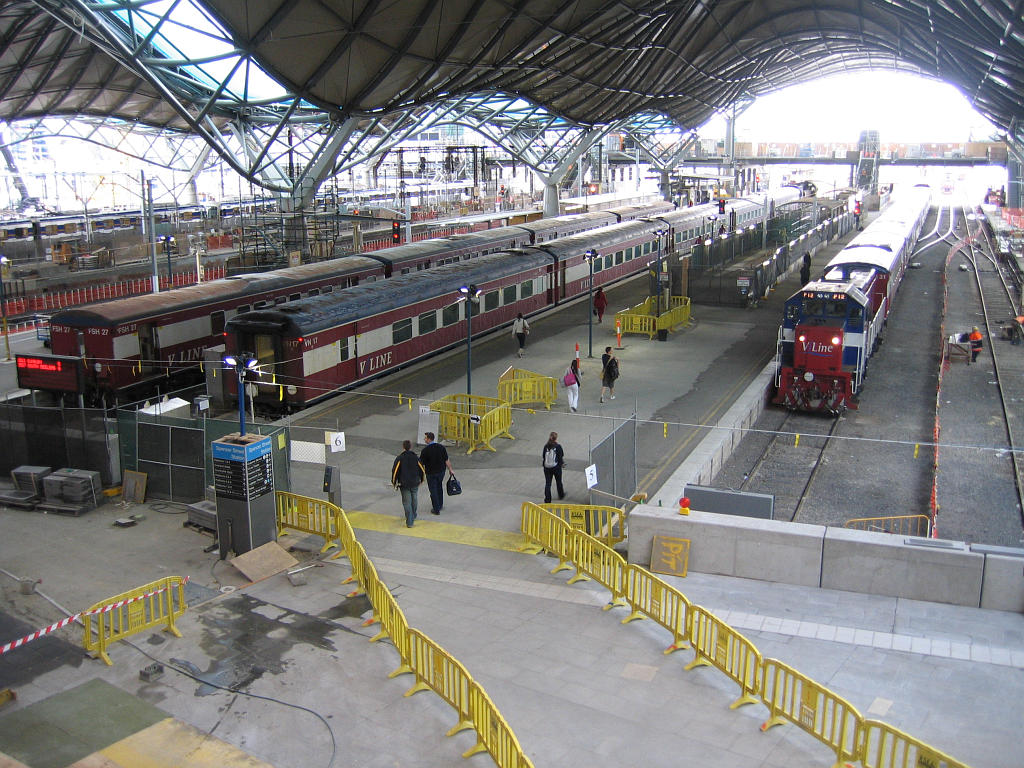
Construction works inside the station, September 2005

Southern Cross was redeveloped by the Civic Nexus consortium, following an innovative design by Grimshaw Architects and Jackson Architecture which features an undulating roof. Construction began in October 2002 and was completed in late 2006, with the majority of the transport facilities finished in time for the 2006 Commonwealth Games. The central features of the design include a wave-shaped roof, a new entrance and concourse on Collins Street, a new coach interchange, a new food court, a bar/restaurant, separate retail outlets inside the station and a separate shopping complex between Bourke and La Trobe streets.

This new shopping complex originally comprised a Direct Factory Outlet centre, a Virgin Megastore, along with food courts. This opened on 30 November 2006, although not all tenancies were occupied, and stage 2 was opened in March 2007. In 2009 the DFO relocated to a new site at South Wharf, the shopping centre being refitted by owner Austexx and rebranded simply as "Spencer Street fashion station". In 2013 the shopping complex was rebranded as "Spencer Outlet Centre".

In addition to the physical modifications, the station was renamed from Spencer Street to Southern Cross on 13 December 2005. The name change had been first announced by the state government in 2001, with then-premier Steve Bracks saying the name stood for multiculturalism, federation, democracy and freedom.

By July 2004, the project had fallen behind schedule and over budget by $200 million. This was covered extensively in the media. As a result of over-runs and design issues, some elements of the original design, including an additional proposed footbridge connecting Lonsdale Street with Docklands Stadium, were scrapped.

Complaints about access to platforms, empty trains occupying space during the day and lack of government support were raised by Leighton Contractors, the construction firm overseeing the project. This led to concerns that the station might not be ready in time for the Commonwealth Games, and the government arranged with the railway operators to provide more access to the work site.

The station's redevelopment is part of the wider Melbourne Docklands development. The architect responsible for the design is Nicholas Grimshaw. The structural engineering design was performed by WSP Global. The station has been awarded the Royal Institute of British Architects' Lubetkin Prize for most outstanding building outside the European Union. The other buildings nominated were the Des Moines Public Library and the Hearst Tower, New York City.

The redevelopment has meant that passengers take more time to get to the suburban network platforms than before. The pedestrian subway access was removed in favour of street level and elevated concourses. The subway also continued underneath Spencer Street, and its closure means it is necessary for all pedestrians to wait for traffic lights to cross Spencer Street at street level. For all suburban and some country services, passengers using the main entrance on the corner of Collins and Spencer Streets have to ascend two escalators to a shopping concourse and then enter the paid area of the station, before descending again to the metropolitan platforms. There have been some accidents in which people have fallen from this elevated level. The 8-metre (26 ft 3 in) ascent and descent is more than necessary to clear the height of trains, and more than the 3-metre (9 ft 10 in) descent and ascent of the previous subway.

Local architects have cited some of the Southern Cross station's shortcomings: the building's poor connection to the surrounding streets; its awkward juncture at the pedestrian bridge that links Spencer Street to Docklands Stadium; and the baffling manner in which the grand architectural gesture of Southern Cross Station tapers off into an uninspired homage to the boxy 1980s shopping centre—Spencer Outlet Centre.

In 2024, air quality data for Southern Cross station was released for the first time, showing that nitrogen dioxide levels have exceeded the World Health Organization's guidelines by 90 times; respiratory experts stated that both short-term and long-term human health is put at risk due to the high air pollution, which is caused by diesel emissions from regional trains and coaches at the station. Civic Nexus, the operator of the station, and the state government state that Southern Cross station meets Australian air quality guidelines. Civic Nexus added that they had no further comment, following a previous enquiry regarding the station's air quality in 2007.

==== Water Tower Clock ====
In May 2014, the historic Water Tower Clock was installed in the concourse of the station. The clock had originally been erected in 1882 at Flinders Street station, opposite the end of Elizabeth Street, atop a lattice tower about 60 feet (18 m) high. In 1902 the clock was moved to Princes Bridge station, and in 1910 it was relocated again, to Spencer Street station, where it remained until it was removed as part of the station's redevelopment in the mid-1960s. The clock mechanism was given to Museum Victoria, but the characteristic turret that housed the clock was sold to a scrap metal merchant. It was later rescued by private collectors, and the clock was returned to public ownership, being put on display in 1999 at the Scienceworks Museum, Spotswood. The clock was extensively restored before its return to Southern Cross, but the original mechanism remains in the collection of Museum Victoria.

=== Track and signalling layouts ===
==== 1870s and 1880s: Pre-viaduct ====
A diagram of the yard area in 1874 shows the passenger area had a departure and an arrival platform parallel to Spencer Street, with two sidings then a third platform marked for "occasional use" and a short dock platform adjacent, terminating ahead of the Engineer in Chief's office which was directly opposite the Collins and Spencer Street intersection, and north of a laneway to access some of the goods shed area. West of the platforms was a two-track carriage shed, a 32 ft (9.8 m) turntable and a nine-track "old" locomotive shed, all connected by a two-track mainline heading towards North Melbourne and beyond. This mainline curved around Goods Sheds Nos.2 through 4 and a new, much larger engine shed, all at 32 ft (9.8 m) above sea level. West of that sector were the two main goods sheds, which extended south of the modern-era alignment of Flinders Street West, a truck repair yard, and a platform for unloading pigs, all at 24 ft (7.3 m) above sea level, then finally a set of loop sidings at 10 ft 6 in (3.20 m) above sea level.

The mechanically interlocked signal box at the station opened in 1887, and was decommissioned in June 2008. Originally built with 120 levers, it had 191 when it closed, making it the world's largest at the time.

From 1888 to 1894, the layout of the platforms was altered, with new country platforms being built on an angle relative to the roadway of Spencer Street.

==== 1890s to 1910s: Connection to Flinders Street and increased goods capacity ====
In 1888, work started on the double track Flinders Street Viaduct linking the station to Flinders Street station. The line was initially only used by freight trains, with passenger train operations commencing in 1894. It was at that time that the first through platform was provided at the station, used by suburban trains from Essendon and Williamstown.

By January 1908 the facilities in and around the station had expanded significantly. On the Spencer Street side, Goods Shed 2 had been reourposed for storage, Goods Shed 4 reallocated to the Inspector of Ironwork and the Inspector of Works, and Goods Shed 3 had been demolished; though its yard area was retained. The land west of the former No.2 shed had been filled in with a series of carriage stabling sidings, including a wash stage and small repair facility, and No.1 Signal Box was situated adjacent to the former locomotive fuel shed. The original departure and arrival platform tracks had been cut back to roughly in-line with Bourke Street and now functioned as headshunts, and a pair of passenger platforms known as the East Passenger Yard (Note: In 1908, East Yard No.1 was roughly 600 ft (183 m), and East Yard No.3 was roughly 720 ft (220 m) long.) had been built over the former yard throat. The old south end platform structures and nine-track engine shed had all been demolished, to make way for the new carriage docks, Centre Yard, West Yard and (suburban) Passenger platforms. The two carriage dock tracks were west of what had been, in 1874, the site of Semaphore No.4, and the western of the two backed onto the rear face of the new Centre Yard platforms. The Centre Yard comprised four tracks between two long platform structures, each capable of handling two trains at any given time. (Note: In 1908, Centre Yard No.1 was roughly 1,581 ft (482 m), and Centre Yard No.4 was roughly 1,260 ft (384 m) long.) The western Centre Yard platform structure was an island, with the West Yard platform on the rear, (Note: In 1908, West Yard No.1 was roughly 1,286 ft (392 m) long.) then a siding for engine escapes and connections to a pair of short milk platforms. (Note: In 1908, the milk platforms were roughly 130 ft (40 m) long.)

Beyond the West Yard was the suburban island platform, with tracks identified as the Up and Down Passenger lines. This platform was accessed by a footbridge that ran behind the milk platforms; the structure was something like 600 ft (180 m) long, but that was bisected by the footbridge which, in January 1908, marked the southern limit of the actual platform; the rest was just an earthen embankment, and each platform face was only around 410 ft (125 m) long. The suburban platform and milk docks were, very approximately, situated at the present-day southern end of Platforms 5, 6 and the southern tip of 7.

The East Yard tracks linked directly to North Melbourne platforms 1 and 2, the Centre Yard to platforms 3 and 4, and the West Yard and suburban tracks to 5 and 6, though trains from the East and Centre Yards could use various crossovers to access any track. Additionally, the East Yard connected to the Bank Sidings and Carriage Shed compound largely north of the Latrobe Street alignment, with ten sidings and further stabling (marked as "Old Yard" and "Sidings D") that could be accessed with further shunting; the lead across the yard throat to the engine shed also connected to a trio of lay-by sidings; and five carriage sidings connected to the West Yard and through passenger lines. The 1908 diagram also shows three signal boxes (No.1, South End, and Viaduct Junction, plus Franklin Street at the bridge over Dudley Street and a set of levers outside North Melbourne station for use during special traffic, e.g. when passenger trains were running to Melbourne Racecourse), and over forty signal posts and gantries.

Beyond the suburban island platform, the original No.1 goods shed was still in use, though its internal track layout had changed somewhat with intermediate wagon turntables removed and three tracks laid throughout, rather than a mix of two and three tracks. Most of the sidings adjacent to the former pig dock were still at least partially in place. A series of goods tracks with two long platforms and the "Old Ballarat Shed" (which postdated the 1874 plan) were next, followed by a replacement No.2 Goods Shed that was built over the site of the previous shed on that site and on a bearing parallel to the new Centre Yard tracks. The next area was a set of sidings labelled for various South Gippsland coal deposits, specifying deliveries from the Coal Creek, Jumbunna and Outtrim companies. The site of the sidings previously at 10 ft 6 in (3.20 m) elevation was taken over by other goods sidings, including scrap material sidings, storage and wash-out facilities for cattle wagons, a new No.3 Goods Shed for general use, a No.4 and No.5 Goods Shed both dedicated to dairy produce and a platform allocated to potato traffic, and lastly a shed each for the Farmer's Loan Agency Company, the Victorian Stevedoring Company, and an unroofed track for "J Lysaght & Co.'. Between Shed No.5 and the Farmer's Loan shed was a short branch siding that exited the yard at the south end, curved eastbound along Flinders Street and then ran towards the Fish Market, passing under the railway viaduct at the corner of Flinders and Spencer Streets. The main goods yard throat for sheds 3, 4 and 5 was roughly in line with the northern seating area of today's Marvel Stadium, with lines running southwest and northwest to various wharfs along Victoria Dock, and along the north face of the West Melbourne Gasworks plant.

At the north end the railway had acquired land between Adderley Street, Dudley Street and the LaTrobe Street alignment as part of the Centre Yard track links and passenger yard throat realignment, and this space was used to build a new eight-track carriage shed as well as a laundry and dining car depot for the long-distance trains. Franklin Street and Dudley Street signal boxes had both been established, diagonally opposite each other with Dudley Street (the road) running in a cutting between them and passing under a series of bridges supporting about twenty individual tracks.

==== 1910s to 1920s: Four viaduct tracks ====
The viaduct to Flinders Street was expanded to four tracks in 1915, with the northern pair connecting to the island platform (now numbered platforms 7 and 8), and the southern pair linking to the goods lines. At this time the West Yard platform was numbered platforms 5 (south end) and 6, with the Centre Yard taking numbers 1–4; the platform numbers for the East Yard are not shown on the December 1917 diagram, but are outlined in Newsrail, December 1982.

Viaduct Junction, between the alignments of Flinders and Collins Streets, was established with crossovers to permit trains to swap between the northern and southern track pairs. It was also the area that allowed Up goods trains to depart from the sheds and yards immediately west of Spencer Street Station towards Flinders Street Station, running via either the north or south viaduct as paths permitted. At the time, all suburban trains used the West lines between Spencer Street platforms 7 and 8, and the bridge over Dudley Street. From there, Franklin Street signal box would have used the crossovers either side of Dudley Street bridge to direct trains to/from the correct platforms at North Melbourne. The line between Flinders Street "A" signal box, Viaduct Junction and Spencer Street No.1 signal box was provided with three-position automatic signals, but from Spencer Street No.1 through Franklin Street to North Melbourne Junction was all operated by Double Line Block using Winters' Instruments.

An article by McLean in Newsrail, December 1982, gives an idea of operation of the yard during Easter of 1919, which was described as the "peak of peaks". For the days from 15 April 1919 to 22 April 1919, Bendigo trains would only use platforms 1 and 2, Ballarat and Geelong trains 4 and 5, and North-eastern corridor (Seymour and beyond) trains used platforms 9, 10 and 11. Notably, platforms 3 and 6, the north ends of 4 and 5 respectively, were not separately identified; this may reflect the length of the expected trains. All locomotives at both Spencer Street and Flinders Street were required to be available to haul their country trains at least 30 minutes in advance of departure, to avoid delays in shunting. On Thursday 17 April, 46 trains departed from Spencer Street between 5:41 am and 8:28 pm, of which about half were extras beyond the normal schedule. Of the regular trains, some had amended requirements such as specific classes of locomotives, or marshalling requirements to allow quick shunting en route, which had to be obeyed.

==== 1920s to 1950s: Increased services and electrification ====
Following the electrification of the suburban lines through the station, today's platforms 11 to 14 were opened in 1924, along with a pedestrian subway providing access to them. These platforms were much further to the west, with the West Passenger Yard's carriage sidings extended south and connections to Flinders Street severed, and three short and one long platform provided as the Special Yard worked by the No.1 Auxiliary Signal Box. By 1933 the East Yard platforms had been extended, a third platform provided on the Spencer Street side, and the tracks renumbered.

A diagram published in 1952 identifies the East Yard platforms, from Spencer Street, as Platforms 10A, 10 and 9, then Centre Yard and West Yard 2+1, 3+4 and 6+5 (latter number at southern end), the Special Yard as tracks 6, 7 and 8 (with no east face to platform 6, and the long platform 8 only given one number), and then suburban platforms 11–14. Along Spencer Street up to Dudley Street there were about 30 stabling sidings, half of which had direct access to the East and Centre Yard platforms and the balance requiring multiple shunts. A few modifications had also been made to the West Yard and Special Yard stabling arrangements. Also notable was track "X", a siding track that crossed diagonally from the locomotive sheds at North Melbourne across all lines to connect to the siding in the East Yard closest to Spencer Street, with diamond crossings over the Suburban tracks and connections to each of the country tracks. This line was used for locomotives, but also for the daily Spirit of Progress train set which would be shunted across the yard in one consist and turned around the large balloon loop at North Melbourne Locomotive Depot, to keep the trailing parlor car at the correct end for each run.

==== 1960s: Standard gauge connection ====
On 27 September 1960 the overhead wiring to the East and Centre passenger stabling sidings was disconnected and abolished. A new railmotor depot was under construction at the north end of Platform 6, and new passenger sidings were under construction in the eastern corner of the site, towards LaTrobe Street. It was noted at the time that the then-in-use railmotor depot occupied the site of the original suburban (island) platforms, part of which was still in use within the maintenance compound, and that the overhead power structures (then being decommissioned) west of Platform 5 were originally used by suburban trains.

By February 1961 the West Passenger Yard and Special Yard had been substantially reconfigured. Platform 6 was extended, and the eastern half of the carriage sidings were deleted. In their place, the north end area was recycled as the new, dedicated Rail Motor Depot Sidings, and the south end was used to create another island platform in the West Yard, which today is known as platforms 5 and 6; the new carriage siding No.1, formerly siding No.8, is now the engine escape track between Platforms 6 and 7. The new platform on the west side did not have an engine escape crossover at the south end, but did have a direct connection to the rail motor depot at the north end. At this time the East Lines over Dudley Street nominally connected to the East Yard, the Centre Lines to the Centre Yard, and the West Lines to the West Yard, though the crossovers either side of Dudley Street and outside No.1 Signal Box would allow trains from most platforms to access most tracks if needed. The only exception was that the Bank Sidings area could only access the East and Centre yards directly. As before, nearly all trains stabled in the Car Sidings adjacent to the West Yard would have required at least two shunting moves, and within that constraint it would still be possible to access any platform in the Country portion of the station. In May 1961 the entire East Yard region was disconnected, abolished and demolished, making room for construction of the new interstate standard gauge platform. The only remaining element was former siding track 2, which was retained as a headshunt for moves to and from the isolated eastern sector of the Bank Sidings. At this time the passenger platforms were renumbered, with the former 1+2 as Platform 2, 3+4 as Platform 3, 5+6 as Platform 4, the new platform in the West Yard as island 5 and 6, the Special Yard as 8, 9 and 10 (with no Platform 7 facing the track of Carriage Siding No.2, formerly no.9), with no changes to the suburban platforms 11–14. As a result, the Up East Main line only retained access to Platform 2 of the Centre Yard, though both Platforms 2 and 3 could access the Down East Main for departures or shunting. The next update was in September, when the pointwork immediately outside No.1 Signal Box was rationalised and simplified. With these changes the West Yard platforms 5 and 6 gained access to the Bank Sidings, but a number of 'pinch points' were added where trains in opposite directions would have to wait for each other. For example, trains between the West Main lines and Platform 4 would now interfere with moves between Platform 3 and the East Main lines. The new arrangements would likely have put more pressure on the West Main lines and the crossovers at Franklin Street signal box.

From 9 January 1962 the East Main line was singled, with the former Down line made bidirectional, and connected to the new North Melbourne flyover from South Dynon diesel depot, and a new Platform 1 had been established on the east side of Siding No.2 in the East Yard. This track had access to the Engine Road crossing diagonally through the whole yard, and the Car Shed part of Bank Sidings but not the open-air sidings immediately to its north and behind No.1 Signal Box. This made way for the former Up East Main track alignment to be re-used as the single standard gauge line from Sydney, approaching over the North Melbourne flyover and parallel to the Diesel Depot track, crossing the Bank Sidings connection then dividing to serve the new platform 1 as well as existing platform 2 and the carriage docks between the two which had been present from at least 1908 To replace those two sidings the southern end of Centre Yard, platforms 2 and 3 (now called South Centre Yard), were modified with docks for loading mail vans. About a fifth of the siding space in Bank Sidings was now severed from the headshunt function of East Yard, so those sidings had to be accessed by shunting via the north-eastern corner of the sidings area towards the corner of Adderley and Dudley Streets. The engine escape links were altered to a simpler arrangement, and the newly dual-gauged Platform 2 had its intermediate crossovers removed to simplify pointwork. From 10 August 1962 changes to the carriage sidings of West Passenger Yard allowed creation of Platform 7 in the Special Yard, leaving only Carriage Siding No.1 (formerly No.7) extending to the south end of the station.

In 1964 the new East Yard platform 1 was approximately doubled in length, allowing it to dock both the Southern Aurora and the Spirit of Progress simultaneously. A third siding track, No.3, was provided in the East Yard passing under the overpass at the north end, providing a standard gauge run-around loop that would enable arriving locomotives to run to South Dynon diesel depot without having to wait for the passenger train behind them to be shunted out of the way. The Centre Yard south end was re-signalled with three-position electric light signals in place of the mechanical arrangements previously in place, and as part of that project new signals U14 and U15 were provided facing south along Platform 3. This is notable because in Victorian Railways' signalling systems of this style, the prefix "U" would ordinarily mean a second signal which shares control with another, e.g. signal control 1 could work either of signals 1 and U1, depending on other conditions. In this case, however, the signals did not share controls with any other function, so the U prefix might have been used to differentiate between the signals 14 and 15 of South End, and the signals 14 and 15 of No.1 Box which were only a short distance away. At the same time, Special Yard platform 7 was extended south, the middle track between platforms 8 and 9 was extended to a short Van Dock Platform, and Platform 9 was also extended slightly south.

By the middle of June 1967 the long diagonal connection to the locomotive depot had been abolished, probably because the North Melbourne Locomotive Depot had recently been demolished and there was no longer a need for regular movements from Spencer Street to that part of Melbourne Yard.

By 14 January 1970 a minor tweak had been made to the signalling at the north end of Platform 2, allowing slightly longer broad gauge trains to run to and from the platform without locking up the whole yard throat. This change roughly coincides with, but may not be related to, the conversion of The Overland from axle-mounted generators to Head End Power, which required an additional carriage-length for a van to house the on-board diesel generators.

A relatively minor change made by the middle of 1973 saw the middle engine track between platforms 4 and 5 raised, including changes to the platform coping, to enable provision of a second motorail ramp loading facility.

==== 1970s: City Loop connection ====
The next major change to Spencer Street yard was brought into use from October 1972, when seven of the Bank Sidings tracks and all nine of the nearby Car Sidings were deleted. The land had to be cleared to make way for excavations along the path of the then-under-construction underground loop. This reduced the East and Centre Yard stabling area by about forty percent (Note: Based on the number of sidings, ignoring individual siding lengths.) but this was manageable as around the same time the older classes of wooden, rarely-used rollingstock (such as the V type) were being withdrawn and scrapped (or transferred to heritage groups), which would have reduced the total stabling space required. Across the 1960s over 120 passenger carriages of various types dating from 1879 to 1905, were scrapped or otherwise withdrawn from passenger service (e.g. pensioned off to heritage groups, or converted to workmens sleeping carriages), and these were followed in the period 1970–1972 by another 60 or so E, PL and Short W and U, while some others were converted to standard gauge and therefore could no longer be stabled at Spencer Street, which only had broad gauge stabling sidings. Additionally, two of the tracks through North Melbourne station had been removed for construction of the City Loop, so the East Main track only retained its link via the flyover to South Dynon depot.

Through 1975 nearly the whole length of the carriage sidings in the Special Yard had been removed and platforms 9 and 10 had been cut back by about half, to make room for the new City Loop portals from those platforms into what would later be the Clifton Hill Loop and Burnley Loop tunnels. The access to platform 10 from the north was slewed over to the alignment of the former layby sidings, and No.1 Auxiliary signal box was demolished and functionally replaced by a control panel in No.1 Signal Box. Hand-thrown crossovers were also added in the lead between the Rail Motor Sidings and platform 6, allowing trains from the platform to shunt across to the remaining carriage sidings or to the Special lines. Carriage Siding No.1 was unnamed but could be thought of as West Yard track No.5, north and south portions, while carriage sidings 5 and 6 conveniently became rail motor sidings 5 and 6, worked by Annett keys released by a cross-lock in No.1 Box. (Note: The late-1975/early-1976 diagram restores the name "Carriage Sidings".) Additionally, the carriage repair depot behind No.1 Signal Box at Bank Sidings was demolished.

By the end of 1976 the City Loop excavation works had been largely completed. The East Suburban lines with platforms 13 and 14, and the West Main lines outside No.1 signal box, were renamed the Through Suburban and Through Country lines respectively to pre-empt changes that would come with the Underground Loop. The Rail Motor sidings were abolished and the area restored to something like its pre-1961 arrangement, now with a diagonal lead from platform 8 towards the Down Through Country line, flanked by eight sidings on the south side and two, numbered 9 and 10 and in roughly the position of the former sidings 5 and 6) on the north side, sandwiched between the Special and Through Country lines. Platform 8 and its van dock platform were reconfigured with more straight track and platform edging, and a pair of parcels sidings with a dedicated dock platform were constructed further along and behind the Victorian Railways' administrative offices. Platform 9 was available for through trains but shaped for its final arrangement linking to the Loop and therefore only had about 111 metres (4-5 carriages) of usable platform space. Platform 10 was 161 metres long and fully available for use, but it was a stub platform only accessible to trains from and to Flinders Street by the North Viaduct lines, so it probably had limited utility. The former Special Yard track No.5, that bypassed what was now Platform 10, had been lifted.

In 1978 final preparations were underway for connecting Spencer Street with the new, additional double-track viaduct then under construction between Flinders Street and Spencer Street stations. Viaduct Junction signal box was abolished and replaced by a new Spencer Street No.2 signal box at the north end of Platforms 13 and 14, which took control of the south end of all the suburban platforms. Track 10A (formerly Special Yard No.5) was restored between Platforms 10 and 11 as a stub siding, though it could only access the Up North Viaduct track so trains would have needed to shunt forward onto the viaduct, then be signalled back into the siding. At this time signals started to be renumbered to their METROL-sequence identities, which required unique, nominally geographic identities for every signal and set of points in the inner metropolitan area. Some track slews were also made in the Main and Through suburban lines north of the suburban platforms. By the end of 1978 the new viaduct tracks were in use, which enabled closure of the South Viaduct pair for maintenance and repairs without disrupting traffic. The Up South Viaduct track was severed just outside Spencer Street station and reclassified as a works siding for this purpose. In April 1979 the South Viaduct reconditioning work was still ongoing, but the area north of the suburban platforms had been altered again. Platform 10 and Track 10A were extended to connect from the Up Main Suburban line, which also had links provided from the newly renamed East Suburban Lines (former lead to the Special Lines from Franklin Street signal box), and two suburban Layby Sidings were provided. In late November the signal panel in No.1 Box that had replaced the Auxiliary box, and the panel in Spencer Street No.2 Box, were both abolished and a new single, combined panel was brought into use in the latter structure. In late October 1979 the South Viaduct lines were restored to use, giving a brief period of all six viaduct tracks in operation; then in February 1980 the North Viaduct was closed and severed for maintenance, while the Up South Viaduct track became the Northern Viaduct and the Down South Viaduct became the Caulfield Viaduct, both signalled for bidirectional running. Additionally, the Up Through Suburban between Franklin Street and Platform 13 was moved to its final position, parallel to its Down partner from platform 14. The end of May 1980 had the former North Viaduct restored, now as the Clifton Hill (former Up) and Burnley (former Down) viaduct tracks, again signalled for bidirectional operation. Shortly thereafter the Up Main Suburban line from Franklin Street was slewed to connect directly to Platform 11, leaving the East Suburban lines (with a brief section of single line) to feed into platform 10, track 10A, and via a new turnout creating a crossover into platform 11. In the middle of the year the tracks from Platform 10 to the Burnley Underground Loop, and platforms 12 and 13 to the Caulfield Underground Loop, were both connected along with a few other turnouts and signals in the area.

Finally, at the end of 1981, Platform 9 was severed from track 8^{A} of the Special Lines and diverted into the City Circle (Clifton Hill) Loop, finally making use of its full platform length.

==== 1980s: New Deal ====
Overlapping slightly with the City Loop track rearrangements, mid to late 1981 saw minor changes made to the West Yard carriage sidings in order to provide a locomotive escape path from the south end of platforms 5 and 6. These would have been critical in the New Deal for Country Passengers, enabling faster train turnaorund with a limited fleet.

1983 saw the majority of Franklin Street junction was abolished and straight-railed, with the Through Country lines, the Up Main Country (not the Down, which was made a stub), the bidirectional East Country line, and the standard gauge mainline all converging on the eastern two tracks over Dudley Street, both of which had been made bidirectional. All these tracks fed through to North Melbourne, and then spread out to country destinations at Moonee Ponds Creek Junction and South Kensington. The North Melbourne flyover tracks remained one of each gauge, but the broad gauge track gained access to North Dynon via a new crossover on the far side. This was a temporary arrangement to make resignalling stages and integration with METROL easier to handle, and the connections were gradually reinstated. During this period the Bank Sidings throat was rearranged, to better suit the New Deal's concept of fixed rolling stock consists that were only divided occasionally, rather than daily.

In response to a shunters strike in April 1986, the fence at the south end of Platform 1 was demolished to create a new Motorail ramp which meant the vehicles could be loaded and unloaded there, instead of having to shunt the wagons to and from the dedicated motorail docks. This change, if made permanent, would have saved 20 minutes from the schedule of the Southern Aurora train which otherwise had to transfer the motorail wagons from the front to the rear of the train at Albury.

During 1992 the headshunt of No.2 Road in the East Passenger Yard, by now renamed 1A with the standard gauge loop as 1B, was extended to a turnout allowing Platform 1 to be used for two broad gauge trains whenever no standard gauge train was present. This was made more useful because the long interstate express trains, the Southern Aurora, Spirit of Progress and Intercapital Daylight, had all ceased by this stage and been replaced by shorter trains like the XPT.

==== 2000s: Additional platforms and Regional Rail Link throat ====
When the station was rebuilt as Southern Cross the 1960s-era Platform 1 was abolished including its loop and shunting tracks, and a shorter platform was provided primarily for New South Wales trains. The remainder of the track layout was more or less unchanged, though an island platform structure was provided west of Platform 14 as future-proofing.

==== 2010s: Additional platforms and Regional Rail Link throat ====
As part of the Regional Rail Link project the extra two platforms (15/16) had track provided and were opened in December 2013. These are divided into 15a, 15b, 16a and 16b. They are used for Gippsland services, and a selection of services from various lines to the north, west and south-west of the state. These platforms allow trains to avoid the North Melbourne Flyover, with its low speed of 15 km/h (9.3 mph), and previously caused abnormal wheel wear on the VLocity fleet, which resulted in months of cancelled services while significant quantities of rolling stock needed their wheels to be reprofiled.

== Platforms and services ==
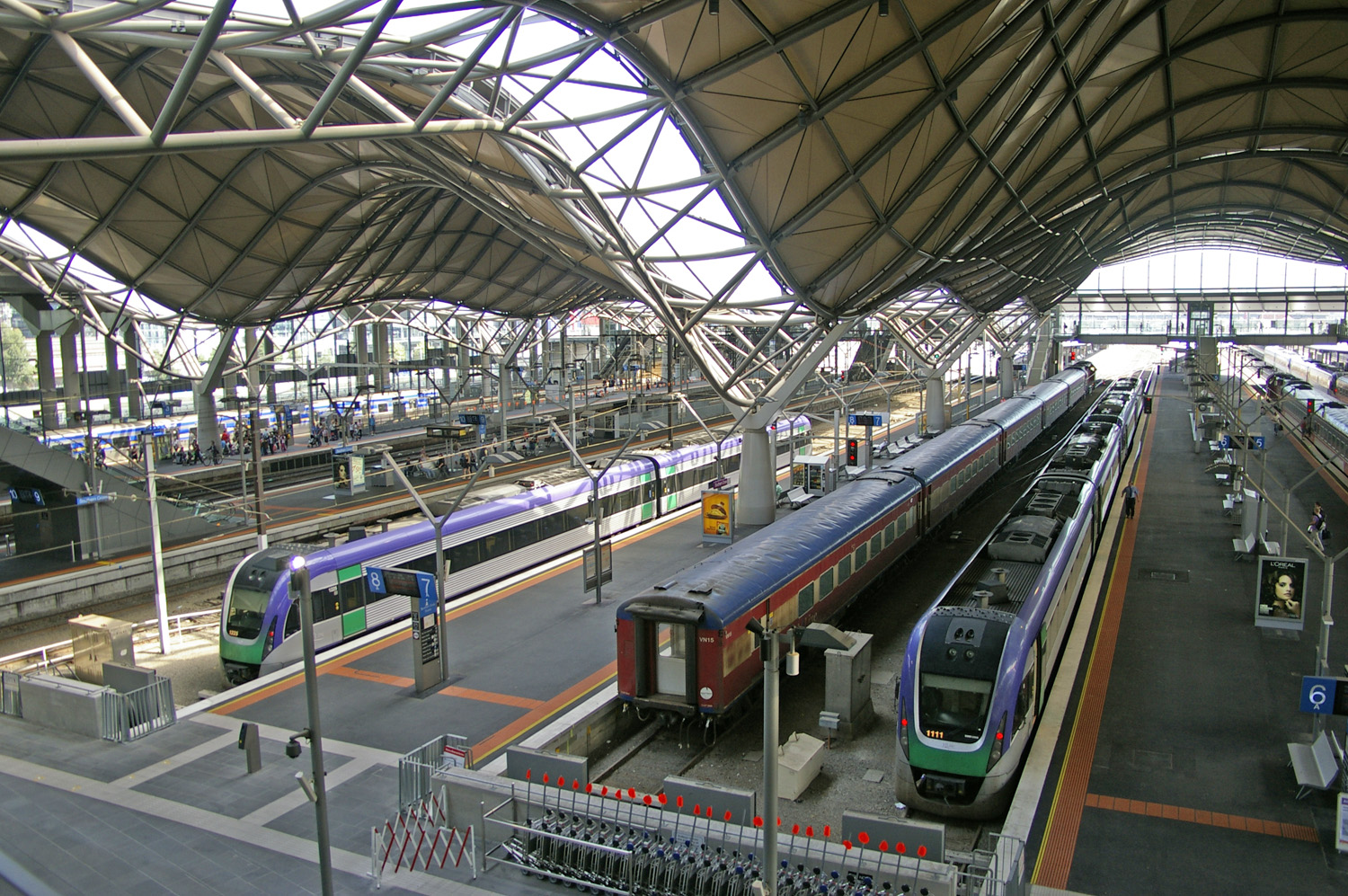
Overlooking platforms 8, 7 & 6, March 2008

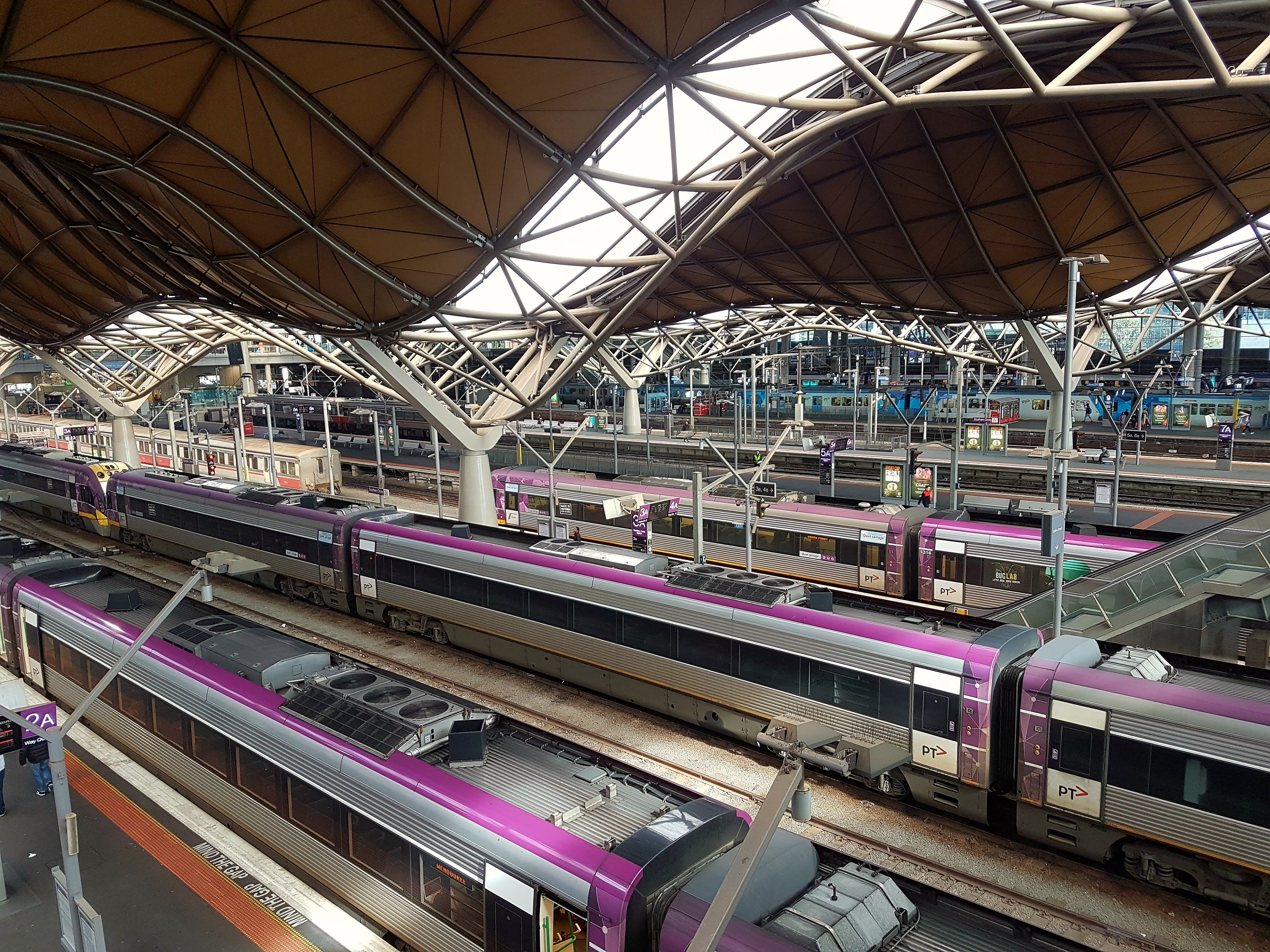
V/Line platforms, August 2017

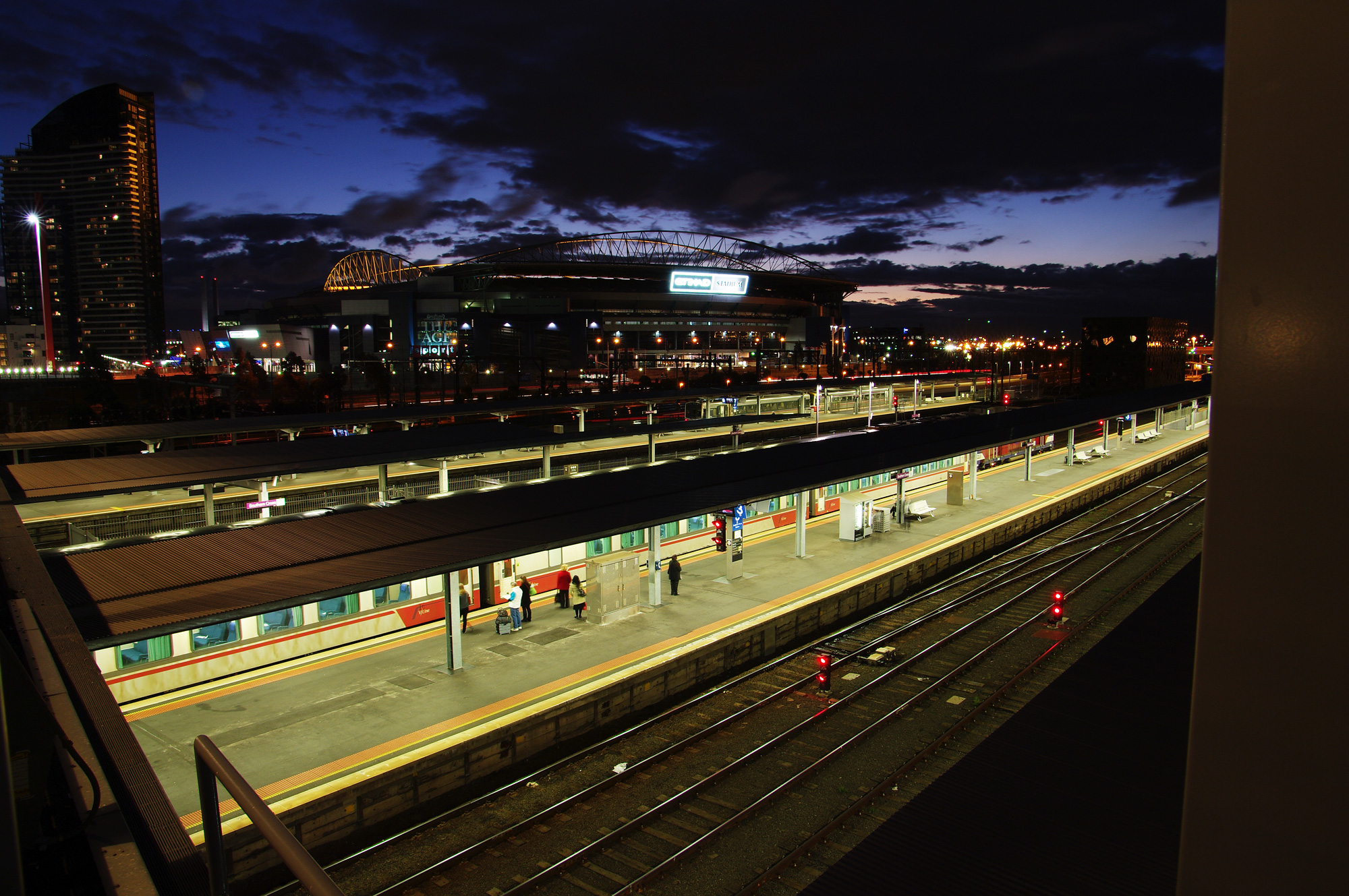
The northern ("B") platforms as seen from the Bourke Street footbridge. Platform 3B is in the foreground and Docklands Stadium is in the background, May 2009

Platforms are numbered from east to west.

=== Concourses ===
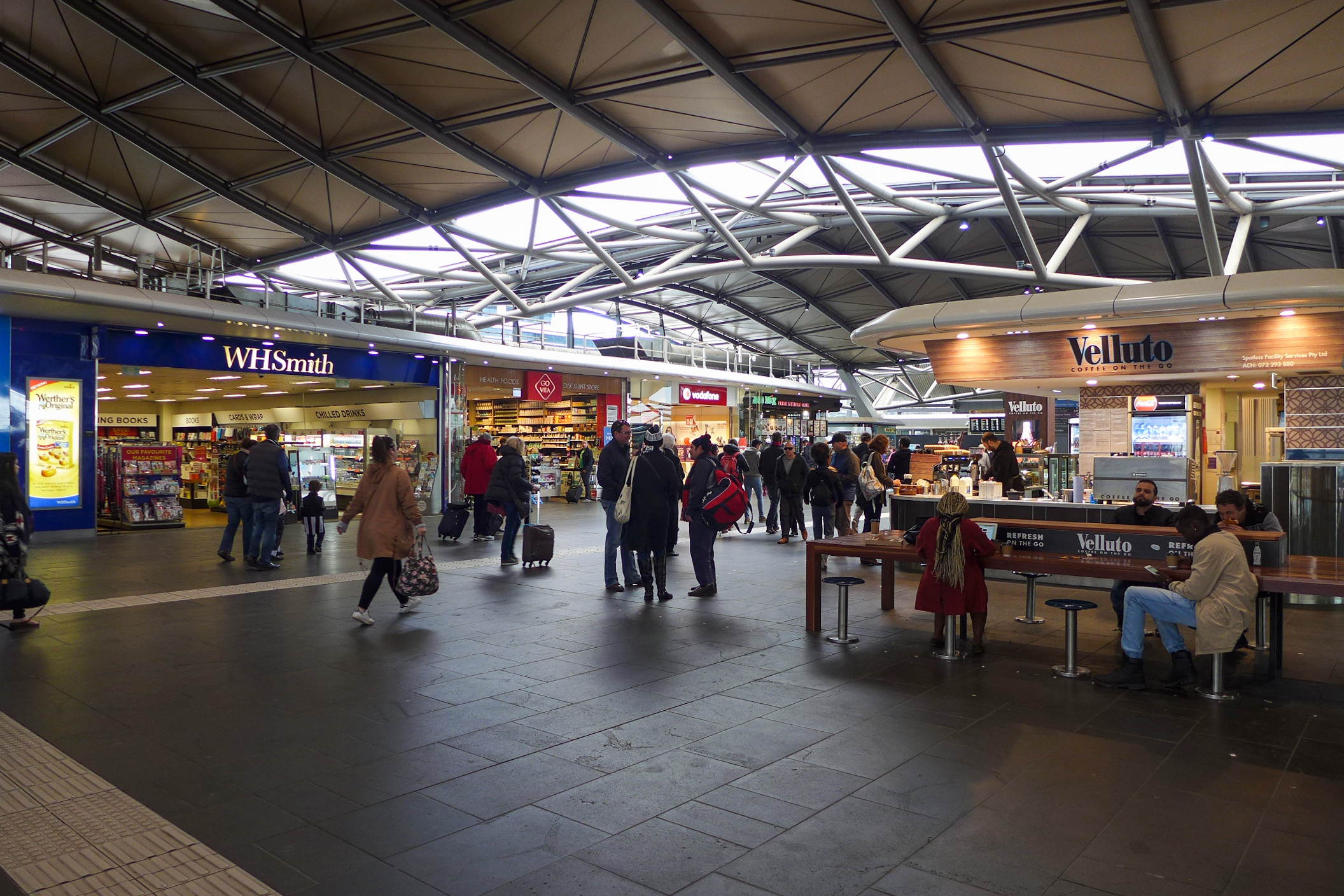
Concourse retail in August 2017

Concourses are provided at Bourke and Collins Streets. Platform 1 is north of Bourke Street, while Platform 8 South is south of Collins Street. The remainder of platforms are located between Bourke and Collins Streets, with access from both concourses, with regional services from platforms 1–8 and 15–16, and suburban services from platforms 9–14 (platform 8 can also accommodate suburban services if necessary).

=== Platforms ===
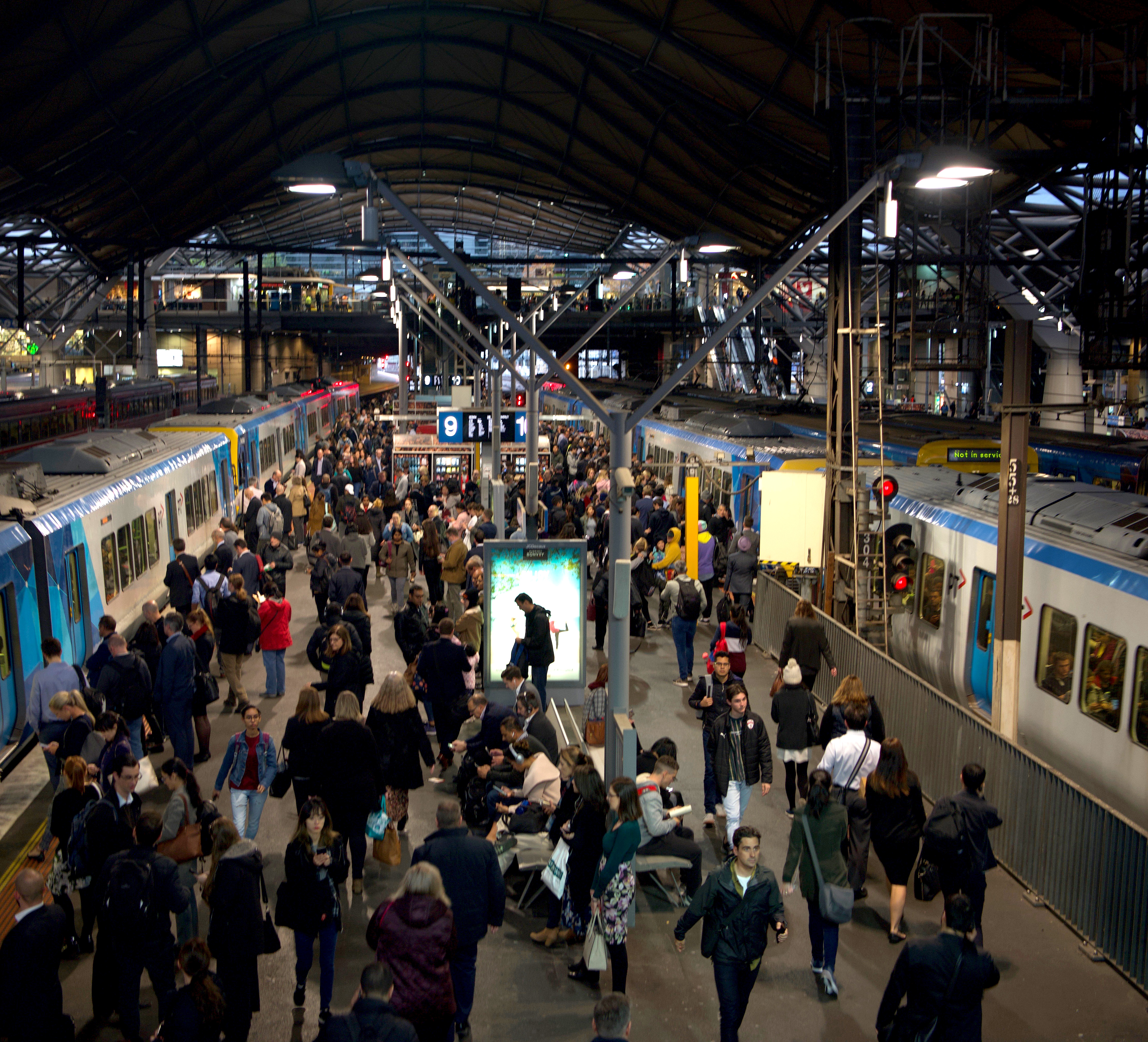
Platforms 9 and 10 during peak hour, April 2019

Platforms 2 to 7, as well as platforms 15 and 16 are numbered as two sections: section A from the Collins Street concourse to the Bourke Street Footbridge, and section B beyond the Bourke Street Footbridge. These sections were previously known as the "Central" (2C to 8C) and "North" (2N to 8N) platforms, respectively. Platform 8 has these two sections and also a "South" section (8S) underneath Collins Street used commonly for Seymour services.

Platforms 1 and 2 are fitted with dual gauge track, permitting both standard gauge interstate trains and V/Line broad gauge trains. The remainder of the platforms are solely broad gauge. A motorail dock is located at the northern end of the platform, with standard gauge access only.

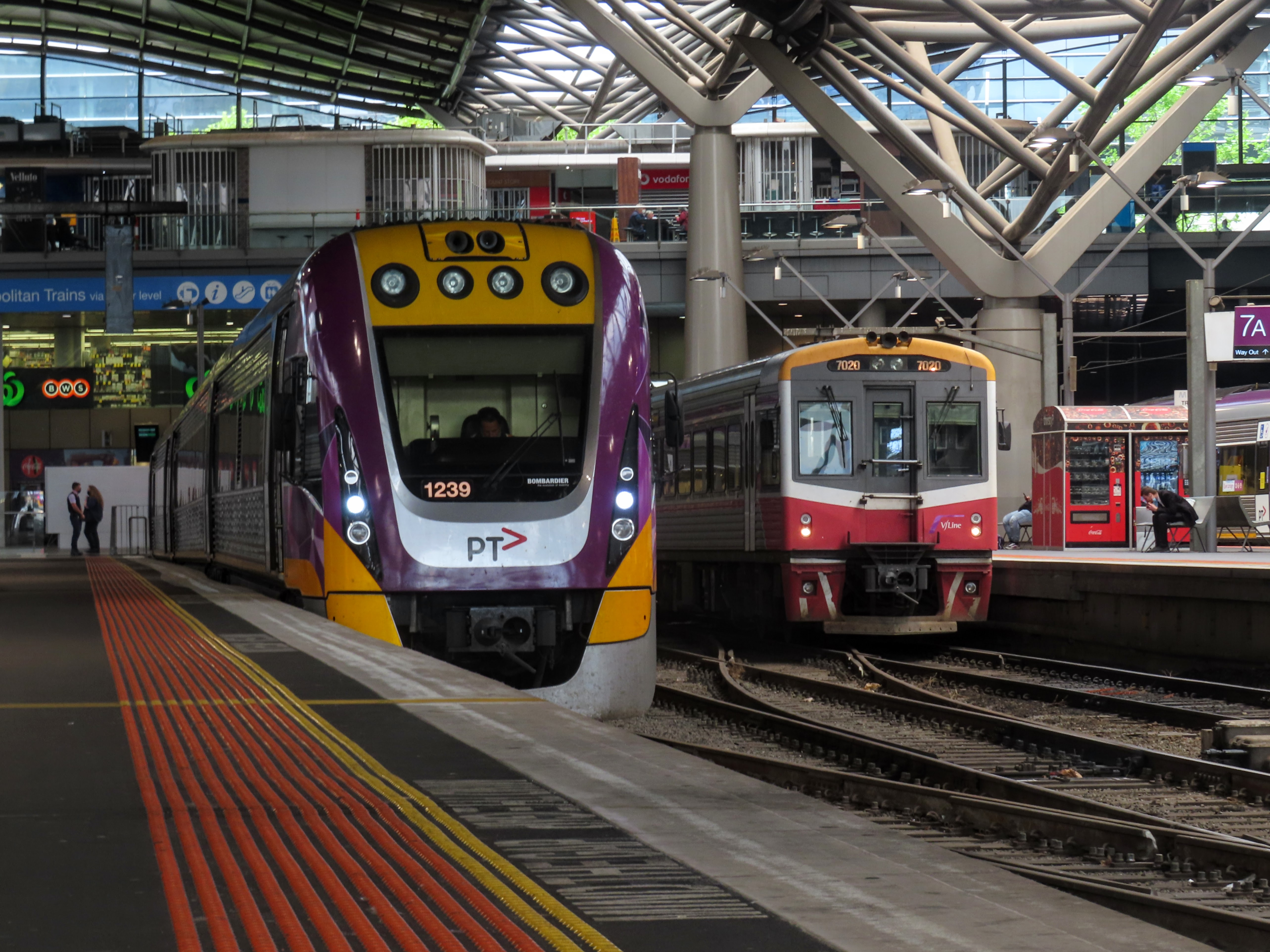
VLocity and Sprinter DMUs await their departure from Melbourne's Southern Cross in January 2021

==== Metropolitan ====
Southern Cross platform arrangement
| Platform | Line | Destination | Service Pattern | Via | Notes | Source |
|---|---|---|---|---|---|---|
| 9 | Mernda line Hurstbridge Line | Epping, Mernda, Macleod, Greensborough, Eltham or Hurstbridge | All stations and limited express services | City Loop | | |
| 10 | Alamein line Belgrave Line; Glen Waverley Line; Lilydale Line | Glen Waverley, Alamein, Blackburn, Ringwood, Lilydale or Belgrave | All stations and limited express services | City Loop or Flinders Street | See City Loop for details of operations. | |
| 11 | Craigieburn line Upfield Line | Broadmeadows, Craigieburn or Upfield | All stations and limited express services | North Melbourne or Flinders Street and City Loop | See City Loop for details of operations. | |
| 12 | Frankston line | Cheltenham, Mordialloc, Carrum or Frankston | All stations and limited express services | Flinders Street | Services to Cheltenham and Carrum only operate during weekday peaks. | |
| 13 | Werribee line Williamstown line | Flinders Street | All stations | | | |
| 13 | Werribee line Williamstown line | Sandringham | All stations | Flinders Street | | |
| 14 | Werribee line | Laverton or Werribee | All stations | North Melbourne | Services to Laverton only operate on weekdays. | |
| 14 | Werribee line | Werribee | Limited Express services | North Melbourne | Weekdays only. | |
| 14 | Williamstown line | Williamstown | All stations | North Melbourne | | |

==== Special event services ====
Southern Cross platform arrangement
| Platform | Line | Destination | Service Pattern | Via | Notes |
|---|---|---|---|---|---|
| 8 | Flemington Racecourse line | Showgrounds, Flemington Racecourse | Express services | | Services starting at Southern Cross. |
| 11 | Flemington Racecourse line | Showgrounds, Flemington Racecourse | Express services | | Services from Flinders Street. |
| 12 | Flemington Racecourse line | Flinders Street | All stations | | |

==== Regional and interstate ====
Southern Cross platform arrangement
| Platform | Line | Destination |
|---|---|---|
| 1 & 2 | Albury line The Overland; NSW TrainLink Southern Seymour line Shepparton line Geelong line Warrnambool line Ballarat line Ararat line Maryborough line Bendigo line Echuca line Swan Hill line | Albury, Adelaide, Sydney, Seymour, Shepparton, Geelong, South Geelong, Marshall, Waurn Ponds, Warrnambool, Wendouree, Ararat, Maryborough, Kyneton, Bendigo, Epsom, Eaglehawk, Echuca, Swan Hill |
| 3 - 8 | Seymour line Shepparton line Geelong line Warrnambool line Ballarat line Ararat line Maryborough line Bendigo line Echuca line Swan Hill line | Seymour, Shepparton, Geelong, South Geelong, Marshall, Waurn Ponds, Warrnambool, Wendouree, Ararat, Maryborough, Kyneton, Bendigo, Epsom, Eaglehawk, Echuca, Swan Hill |
| 15 & 16 | Traralgon line Bairnsdale line Seymour line Shepparton line Geelong line Warrnambool line Ballarat line Ararat line Maryborough line Bendigo line Echuca line Swan Hill line | Traralgon, Bairnsdale, Seymour, Shepparton, Geelong, South Geelong, Marshall, Waurn Ponds, Warrnambool, Wendouree, Ararat, Maryborough, Kyneton, Bendigo, Epsom, Eaglehawk, Echuca, Swan Hill |

== Transport links ==
=== Metropolitan ===
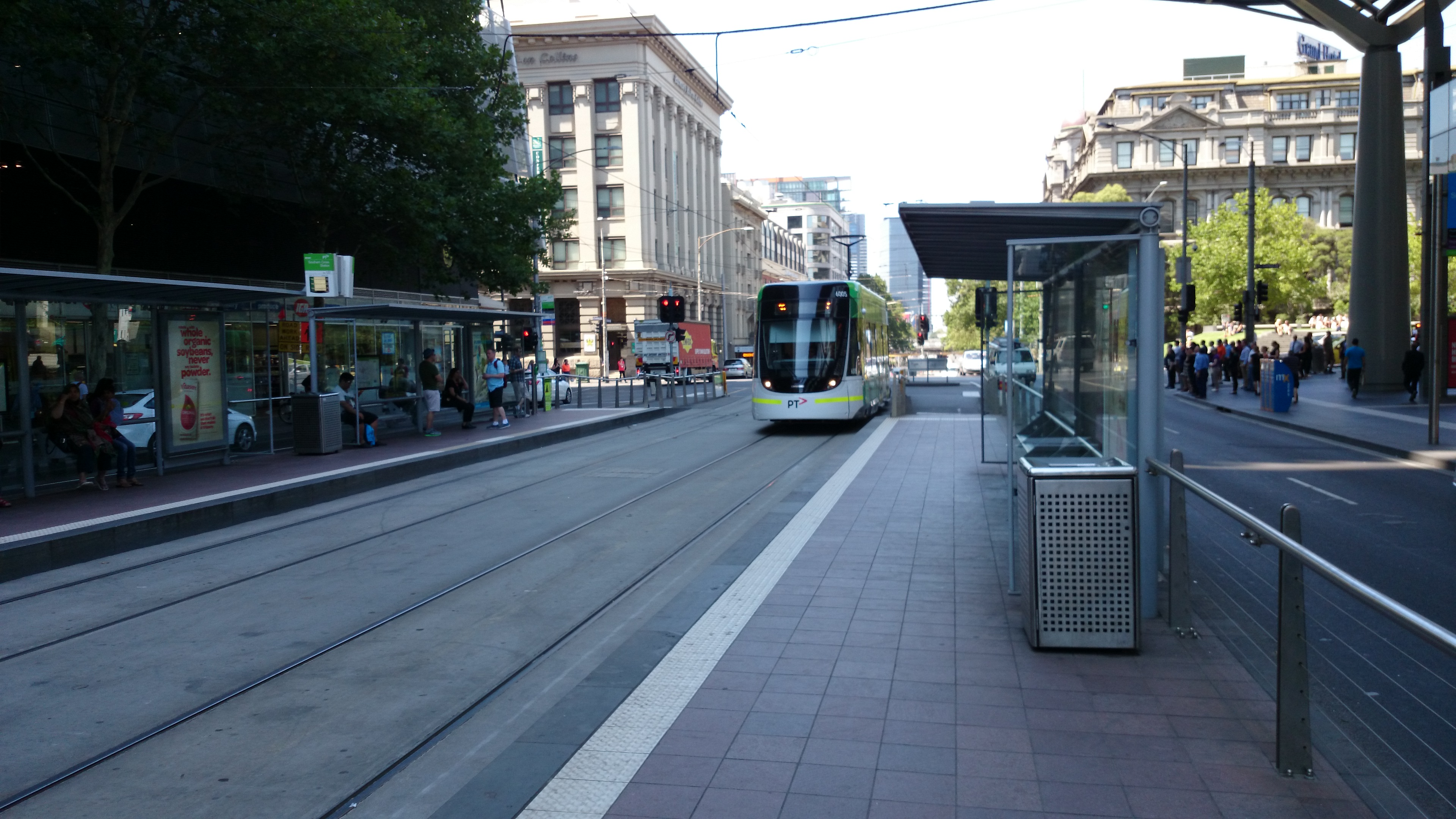
Spencer Street tram stop in February 2014

Kinetic Melbourne operate three bus routes via Southern Cross station:

- 232 : Queen Victoria Market – Altona North
- 235 : to Fishermans Bend
- 237 : to Fishermans Bend

Yarra Trams operate nine services via Southern Cross station:

From Collins Street:

- : West Preston – Victoria Harbour
- : Balwyn North – Victoria Harbour
- : Box Hill – Port Melbourne
- : Victoria Gardens – St Kilda

From Harbour Esplanade:

- : City Circle
- : Docklands – Wattle Park
- : Docklands Stadium – Vermont South

From Bourke Street:

- : RMIT Bundoora campus – Waterfront City Docklands
- : East Brunswick – St Kilda Beach

=== Regional ===
The following coach services are operated to and from Southern Cross station by private companies on behalf of V/Line:

- Mildura via Ballarat, Maryborough and Donald
- Mount Gambier via Ballarat, Hamilton and Casterton
- Barham via Heathcote
- Barmah via Heathcote and Shepparton
- Deniliquin via Heathcote, Rochester, Echuca and Moama
- Mansfield via Lilydale and Yarra Glen (services extend to Mount Buller during snow season)
- Cowes via Dandenong and Koo Wee Rup
- Inverloch via Dandenong and Koo Wee Rup
- Yarram via Dandenong, Koo Wee Rup and Leongatha

== Usage ==
Passenger usage at Southern Cross Station between 2008 and 2024 sorted by financial year and type of rail service.

Southern Cross is the second-busiest station on Melbourne's metropolitan rail network.
