= Outtrim railway line =

Former railway line in Victoria, Australia

Outtrim

Overview
- Status: Dismantled line
- Owner: Victorian Railways (VR) (1892–1959)
- Locale: Victoria, Australia
- Termini: Korumburra; Outtrim
- Continues from: Port Albert line
- Former connections: Port Albert line
- Stations: 4 former stations; 1 proposed station; 8 former siding

Service
- Type: Former Victorian regional service
- Operator(s): Victorian Railways (VR) (1892–1959)

History
- Commenced: 28 October 1892
- Opened: Korumburra to Coal Creek on 28 October 1892; Jumbunna Junction to Jumbunna on 7 May 1894; Strezlecki Junction to Strezlecki Siding on 1 June 1894; Jumbunna to Outtrim on 5 February 1896
- Completed: 5 February 1896
- Closed: Austral Siding to Strezlecki Siding on 19 June 1911; Strezlecki Junction to Austral Siding on 10 May 1951; Jumbunna to Outtrim on 4 September 1951; Jumbunna Junction to Jumbunna on 30 September 1953; Korumburra to Coal Creek on 15 April 1959

Technical
- Line length: 15.240 km (9.47 mi) Korumburra to ...: Outrim: 10.522 km (6.54 mi); Coal Creek Siding: 1.728 km (1.07 mi); Strezlecki Siding: 4.897 km (3.04 mi)
- Number of tracks: Single track
- Track gauge: 5 ft 3 in (1,600 mm) Victorian broad gauge

The Outtrim railway line is a closed railway situated in the South Gippsland region of Victoria, Australia. It was a 6-mile (10 km) branch of the former South Gippsland railway (also known as Great Southern Railway) and connected with the main line near Korumburra railway station. The line was primarily built to allow the exploitation of black coal deposits in the Outtrim area.

== History ==
The line was opened in two stages; from Korumburra to Jumbunna on 7 May 1894, and from Jumbunna to Outtrim on 5 February 1896. On 28 October 1892 a short 1-mile (2 km) branch to the Coal Creek coalfield was opened, connecting with the Outtrim line just south of Korumburra station.

The Outtrim line was closed in two stages; on 4 September 1951 from Jumbunna to Outtrim, and on 1 October 1953 from Jumbunna to Korumburra. The closure came at a time when the Victorian government was closing many short branch lines throughout the state.

The Jumbunna railway embankment and viaduct are listed in the Victorian Heritage Inventory.

== Station histories ==
Station	Opened	Closed	Age	Notes
Korumburra	2 June 1891 || 15 December 1994 || data-sort-value=37,816 | 103 years			
Korumburra	15 December 1994 || 16 January 2016 || data-sort-value=7,702 | 21 years	Tourist service		
Coal Creek Siding	28 October 1892 || 15 April 1959 || data-sort-value=24,274 | 66 years			
Korumburra & Jeetho Siding	?	?	?	
Silkstone Siding	?	?	?	Never fully built
Wynne's Siding	?	?	?	
Newcastle	-	-	-	Planned, never built
New Extended Siding	?	?	?	Formerly Sunbeam Collieries Siding
Austral Siding	?	10 May 1951	?	Formerly Black Diamond
Strezlecki Siding	1 June 1894 || 19 June 1911 || data-sort-value=6,226 | 17 years			
Jumbunna	7 May 1894 || 30 September 1953 || data-sort-value=21,695 | 59 years			
Jumbynna Coal Co Siding	5 February 1896 || June 1952 || data-sort-value=20,587 | 56 years			
Outtrim North	5 February 1896 || 4 September 1951 || data-sort-value=20,299 | 55 years			
Outtrim	5 February 1896 || 4 September 1951 || data-sort-value=20,299 | 55 years			

=== Jumbunna ===
Jumbunna was a railway station on the Outtrim railway line in South Gippsland, Victoria, Australia. The station was opened in 1894, and was one of only three stations on the Outtrim line which was eventually closed in two stages between 1951 and 1953, when Victorian Railways was closing many other small branch lines.

The original station, now converted into a 3 bedroom house, and miniature railway was put up for sale in late 2006. It is located near Jumbunna, Victoria.

=== Outtrim North ===
Outtrim North was a railway station on the Outtrim railway line in South Gippsland, Victoria, Australia. The station opened with the Jumbunna to Outtrim extension on 5 February 1896, and was one of only three on the Outtrim branch. The station was closed on 4 September 1951.

=== Outtrim ===
Outtrim was the terminus station on the Outtrim railway line in Victoria, Australia. It closed in 1951 along with Outtrim North. The first sod of soil turned in the construction of the Outtrim railway line was on 6 March 1885. The line was completed by 1896. It was located in Outtrim, Victoria.

== See also ==
- List of closed railway stations in Victoria
- Rail transport in Australia
- Transport in Australia
