= Outtrim =

- Town
- Coordinates: 38°30′S 145°47′E
- Country: Australia
- State: Victoria
- LGA(s): South Gippsland Shire
- Location: 151 km (94 mi) SE of Melbourne

Government
  - State electorate(s): Bass
  - Federal division(s): Monash

Population
  - Total(s): 270 (SAL 2021)
- Postcode: 3951

Outtrim is a locality in Victoria, Australia. It is located south of Korumburra off the Korumburra to Wonthaggi Road and is southeast of Melbourne.

== History ==
The original European settlers in the mid-19th century used the area for farming, but coal was discovered south of what would become Outtrim railway station in 1892. The Outtrim and Jumbunna coal fields developed in the mid-1890s, with access to the markets for the coal being established via the Outtrim railway line.

The township grew up by the mine and was named after the Honourable Alfred Richard Outtrim, MLA, Minister of Mines in the Victorian Government at the time.

Outtrim Primary School opened in January 1890 and closed in 1993. When the coal mines were at their peak more than 200 children attended the four-roomed school. The school was relocated to a different site in 1976, with the remaining original buildings demolished at that time.

Outtrim Baptist Church opened in 1897 but was later destroyed by fire.

By 1901, the town had "a large commercial area, with hotels, shops and several churches."

The Outtrim mine was one of the locations for a major coal strike in 1903.

A Masonic Lodge opened in 1908. It met in Korumburra from 1919 after its own premises were destroyed by fire.

When coal production declined and then ceased with the closing of the mines in 1914, the population dwindled very quickly, with many moving to Wonthaggi where a large mine opened in 1909. Successive fires in 1912 and 1913 destroyed much of the town.

Outtrim Post Office opened on 10 May 1894 and closed in 1957.

By the 1940s, only a small number of companies remained working the mines in the area. By the 1980s, the township of Outtrim had virtually disappeared, with only a few buildings remaining in the town area and the land returned to farming.

The land around Outtrim is largely cleared of native vegetation and is used for agriculture, including dairying.

== Cemetery ==
Outtrim Cemetery, established circa 1894, is set in woodland one kilometre east of Outtrim Recreation Reserve on the Leongatha South Road. The cemetery has fifteen marked graves, with the earliest dating from 1902. It is believed that there are a total of 220 burials in the cemetery, with last burial being in 1946. The cemetery is listed on the Victorian Heritage Inventory.

The entire cemetery reserve is now reserved permanently for nature conservation purposes and is managed by Parks Victoria.
