= QEC =

QEC may refer to:

- Quantum error correction
- Queen Elizabeth-class aircraft carrier, two aircraft carriers of the United Kingdom's Royal Navy
- Electoral Commission of Queensland
- Queen Elizabeth College
  - Queen Elizabeth College, London, UK
  - Queen Elizabeth College, Palmerston North, New Zealand
  - Queen Elizabeth College, Mauritius
- Queen Elizabeth Centre, Ballarat
- Qulliq Energy Corporation
- Quant Equities Corner.
