= Electoral results for the district of Maryborough (Victoria) =

Victoria, Australia, district election results

This is a list of electoral results for the electoral district of Maryborough in Victorian state elections.

== Members for Maryborough ==
First incarnation 1859–1877, two members
Member 1	Term	Member 2	Term
Richard D. Ireland	Oct 1859 – Dec 1860	Michael Prendergast	Oct 1859 – Jul 1861
Nathaniel Levi	Jan 1861 – Dec 1865	Richard Davies Ireland	Aug 1861^{[c]}
Nathaniel Levi	Jan 1861 – Dec 1865	George S. Evans	Oct 1861 – Aug 1864
Nathaniel Levi	Jan 1861 – Dec 1865	James Mason	Nov 1864 – Dec 1865
Robert Bowman	Feb 1866 – Mar 1870	James McKean	Feb 1866 – Jan 1871
Duncan Gillies	Mar 1870 – Apr 1877	William Fraser	Apr 1871 – Apr 1877

^{[c]} Davies won both Maryborough and Villiers and Heytesbury at the August 1861 general elections, he resigned from Maryborough.

Second incarnation 1889–1927, one member
Member	Party	Term
Alfred Outtrim	Unaligned	1889–1902
Frederick Field	Unaligned	1902–1904
Alfred Outtrim	Labor	1904–1916
Alfred Outtrim	National Labor	1916–1917
Alfred Outtrim	Nationalist	1917–1920
George Frost	Labor	1920–1927

== Election results ==
=== Elections in the 1920s ===
1924 Victorian state election: Maryborough
Party	Candidate	Votes	%	±%
Labor	George Frost	3,207	68.3	+12.3
Independent Liberal	Thomas Richards	1,488	31.7	+31.7
Total formal votes		4,695	99.4	−0.2
Informal votes		31	0.6	+0.2
Turnout		4,726	74.3	−2.0
Labor hold		Swing	N/A	

1921 Victorian state election: Maryborough
Party	Candidate	Votes	%	±%
Labor	George Frost	2,837	56.0	+7.4
Nationalist	James Holland	2,229	44.0	+9.5
Total formal votes		5,066	99.6	+5.6
Informal votes		20	0.4	−5.6
Turnout		5,086	76.3	+2.7
Labor hold		Swing	+4.4	

1920 Victorian state election: Maryborough
Party	Candidate	Votes	%	±%
Labor	George Frost	2,319	48.6	+7.8
Nationalist	Alfred Outtrim	1,649	34.5	−5.4
Victorian Farmers	Robert Laidlaw	806	16.9	+16.9
Total formal votes		4,774	94.0	−4.0
Informal votes		305	6.0	+4.0
Turnout		5,079	73.6	+6.4
Two-party-preferred result
Labor	George Frost	2,466	51.6	+8.2
Nationalist	Alfred Outtrim	2,308	48.4	−8.2
Labor gain from Nationalist		Swing	+8.2	

=== Elections in the 1910s ===
1917 Victorian state election: Maryborough
Party	Candidate	Votes	%	±%
Labor	Thomas Jude	1,929	40.8	−21.8
National Labor	Alfred Outtrim	1,886	39.9	+39.9
Nationalist	Robert Laidlaw	908	19.2	−18.2
Total formal votes		4,723	98.0	−0.3
Informal votes		99	2.0	+0.3
Turnout		4,822	67.2	+7.0
Two-party-preferred result
National Labor	Alfred Outtrim	2,672	56.6	+56.6
Labor	Thomas Jude	2,051	43.4	−19.2
National Labor gain from Labor		Swing	N/A	

1914 Victorian state election: Maryborough
Party	Candidate	Votes	%	±%
Labor	Alfred Outtrim	2,930	62.6	+6.7
Liberal	James Holland	1,748	37.4	−6.7
Total formal votes		4,678	98.3	−0.6
Informal votes		83	1.7	+0.6
Turnout		4,761	60.2	−13.7
Labor hold		Swing	+6.7	

1911 Victorian state election: Maryborough
Party	Candidate	Votes	%	±%
Labor	Alfred Outtrim	3,245	55.9	N/A
Liberal	James Bennett	2,562	44.1	+44.1
Total formal votes		5,807	98.9	
Informal votes		63	1.1	
Turnout		5,870	73.9	
Labor hold		Swing	N/A	
