= Alfred Richard Outtrim =

Australian politician

- In office December 1885 – April 1892
- Constituency: Maryborough and Talbot
- In office May 1892 – September 1902
- Constituency: Maryborough
- In office June 1904 – September 1920
- Constituency: Maryborough

Personal details
- Born: 30 March 1845 London, England
- Died: 21 December 1925 (aged 80) Carisbrook, Australia
- Party: Liberal (1885–1902); Labor (1904–1916); National Labor (1916–1917); Nationalist (1917–1920)
- Spouse: Jane Lavinia Tutcher
- Profession: Auctioneer

Alfred Richard Outtrim (1845 – 1925) was a long-serving Victorian politician who gained a reputation as a competent government minister and a promoter of women's suffrage and regional development.

Before Federation, he was a liberal Minister in the Munro, Shiels and McLean governments. He served seven terms in the Victorian Legislative Assembly from 1885 before being defeated by F. J. Field in 1902. Joining with Labor, Outtrim successfully recontested Maryborough in 1904 and then served an additional seven terms to 1920 ending his political career as the father of the house.

Before the 1890s, there was no formal party system in Victoria. Party labels before that time indicate a general tendency only. From the 1880s, until after Federation in 1901, Victorian politics were dominated by Protectionist Liberals, who were opposed by Free Trade Conservatives. The Labor Party did not emerge as a major party until after 1910, which meant that Victoria was slow to develop a two-party system. Outtrim's political career reflects this strongly.

Over the course of his 34-year parliamentary career, Outtrim changed parties several times: from 1885 to 1902 he served as a liberal and supported liberal and reform administrations. In 1902 he was defeated in Maryborough but returned representing Labor from 1904 to 1916. With the split in Labor over conscription Outtrim sided with Prime Minister Billy Hughes and became a Nationalist from 1916. Outtrim was now the father of the Victorian Assembly and in 1920 he was finally defeated by Labor's George Frost.

== Early life ==
In December 1851, when he was just 6, Outtrim, his two sisters, four brothers and their mother, arrived from England to join their father. Shortly after, his father and youngest brother died and the family was forced to live in a tent in Collingwood.

The family moved to Maryborough 1854. As a young man, Outtrim became manager of the Maryborough branch of Cobb and Co, worked as a wine and spirit merchant and, with a brother, purchased the carrying business of McCulloch & Company.

Outtrim became a director and legal manager of mining companies.

He courted Jane Lavinia Tutcher, who was born in Somerset and had come to Maryborough in 1856. Her mother and stepfather owned the McIvor Hotel. On 7 March 1871, Alfred and Jane married at the Maryborough Christ Church. Between 1871 and 1883, they had five daughters and two sons.

By 1885, Outtrim was an auctioneer, general commission agent, district auditor, legal manager, and director of local gold-mining companies.

== Political career ==
Outtrim unsuccessfully contested Maryborough and Talbot in 1883.

A councilor for six years, Outtrim was Maryborough mayor from 1884 to 1886.

In December 1885 Outtrim entered colonial politics winning a by-election for Maryborough and Talbot.

He sat on five royal commissions and seven select committees. He was appointed chairman for seven of these.

Outtrim introduced the 1896 and 1898 referendum bills against the Victorian Upper House which prompted Sir Alexander Peacock to describe him as a radical politician.

In 1899 Outtrim was appointed Railways minister in Allan McLean's liberal government and proceeded to promote regional Victoria, introducing a railway bill to connect Woomelang to Mildura.

A supporter of women's suffrage in 1899 Outtrim addressed the Victorian Parliament thus, "I notice that those who oppose women's franchise, as a rule, are those who are the wealthiest in the community and they do not know who they are who have to go out between five and six in the morning. But I very often have to catch an early train and travel on these trams and I have no hesitation in saying that there are hundreds of women – honest, respectable women – travelling at that time of the morning to their occupations, having perhaps sick fathers or mothers depending on their earnings, and doing all they can to keep the wolf from the door."

In 1913 Outtrim served as a minister in the 14-day Labor government of George Elmslie.

In 1916 Outtrim's loyalty to the British Empire saw him split with the Labor party over their anti-conscription stance and he ultimately joined the conservative Nationalist Party.

Outtrim was defeated in Maryborough by Labor candidate George Clement Frost in the 1920 Victorian state election.

Outtrim died on 21 December 1925 at his home in Carisbrook east of Maryborough. He was buried with Anglican rites in Maryborough cemetery. He was survived by his wife and four children. For his commemoration his family donated a set of stained-glass windows to Christ Church, where he had been a regular attender and where he and Jane had married 54 years before.

The township of Outtrim, southwest of Korumburra, is named after him.

Outtrim Avenue in the Canberra suburb of Calwell is also named in his honour.

Parliament of Victoria
Preceded by Robert Bowman	Member for Maryborough and Talbot; 1885–1892	Succeeded by Electorate abolished
New division	Member for Maryborough; 1892–1902	Succeeded by Frederick James Field
Preceded by Frederick James Field	Member for Maryborough; 1902–1920	Succeeded by George Clement Frost
Preceded by	Minister of Mines; 1890–1893	Succeeded by
Preceded by	Minister for Defense; 1892	Succeeded by
Preceded by	vice-president Board Land & Works; 1891–1893	Succeeded by
Preceded by	Minister for Railways; 1899–1900	Succeeded by
Preceded by	Minister for Mines; 9–22 Dec 1913	Succeeded by
Preceded by	Minister for Forests; 9–22 Dec 1913	Succeeded by
Preceded by	Vice-president Board Land & Works; 9–22 Dec 1913	Succeeded by
