= Jessie Margaret Langham =

Australian nurse (1902-1988)

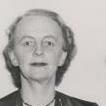
- Langham in 1954
- Born: 26 March 1902; Korumburra, Victoria
- Died: 12 November 1988 (aged 86); Heidelberg, Victoria
- Military career
- Allegiance: Australia
- Branch: Second Australian Imperial Force
- Service years: 1940–1946
- Rank: Captain
- Service number: VX8396
- Conflicts: Second World War
- Awards: Officer of the Order of the British Empire; Associate Royal Red Cross

Jessie Margaret Langham, OBE, ARRC (26 March 1902 – 12 November 1988) was an Australian nurse who was awarded the Associate Royal Red Cross in the Second World War. She served as hospital matron at Ballarat Base Hospital for twenty years and was appointed an Officer of the Order of the British Empire.

== Early life ==
Langham was born on 26 March 1902 in Korumburra, Victoria, to Catherine (née Clark) and William Smith Langham. Her father was a pastoralist. She was in her late twenties when she began her training as a nurse at the (Royal) Melbourne Hospital in 1929. She was awarded the C. L. Forrest Trust gold medal for general proficiency and completed her basic training in 1932, after which she went to Queen Victoria hospital to train in midwifery. In 1935 she left her position as Melbourne Hospital's night superintendent to begin two years working for the Australian Inland Mission at the Victoria River Downs Station in the Northern Territory.

== Nursing career ==
In May 1940, following the outbreak of the Second World War, Langham joined the Australian Army Nursing Service as part of the Second Australian Imperial Force. She disembarked in England in July and served with the 2/3rd Australian General Hospital and the Tidworth Military Hospital, Wiltshire, before embarking for the Middle East in November with the 2/3rd Australian General Hospital. The hospital moved to Gaza and was redesigned as the 2/11th Australian General Hospital. She was sister-in-charge at the 2/11th's surgical ward in Alexandria in 1941. By that December, Japan had joined the war and she left the Middle East and began work in Queensland where she was given the rank of captain in 1943.

Langham was awarded an Associate Royal Red Cross in the 1945 King's Birthday Honours together with four others, Ellen Fenner, Kath Bonnin, Ethel Youman and Martha Hateley. Her award was for "great devotion to duty often in dangerous and difficult circumstances and for outstanding ability".

Langham was the matron at Ballarat Base Hospital from 1947 to 1967, and was appointed an Officer of the Order of the British Empire (OBE) in 1969.

== Death and legacy ==
The Ballarat Base Hospital named its nurses home for her in 1988, and Langham died in the suburb of Heidelberg, Victoria, later in the same year. In the following year her OBE medal was given to the Ballarat Base Hospital. In 1997 all of her papers were given to the University of Melbourne as she had no surviving family.
