= Kath Bonnin =

Australian army nurse (1911 – 1985)

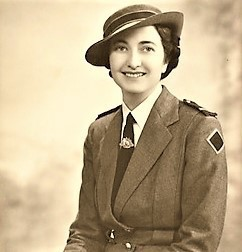
- Captain Bonnin
- Born: Kathleen Patricia Bonnin; 17 March 1911; Hindmarsh, Adelaide
- Died: 14 September 1985 (aged 74); North Adelaide
- Occupations: Army nurse; midwife

Kathleen Patricia (Kath) Bonnin (17 March 1911 – 14 September 1985) was an Australian army nurse. Captain Kath Bonnin was awarded an Associate Royal Red Cross and she was mentioned in despatches.

== Life ==
Bonnin was born in 1911 in the Adelaide suburb of Hindmarsh. Her whole family was involved in medicine. Her father, James Atkinson Bonnin, practised medicine as, in time, did four of her five surviving brothers – one who became a lawyer. She, like her sister Win, and Winifred Turpin, her mother, were nurses. She qualified in Adelaide and, as a midwife, in the UK in 1936. She took a long holiday out travelling in Europe and in 1938 she became an air-hostess.

The second world war started in 1939 and in the following year Bonnin volunteered on 4 April 1940. She joined the Australian Army Nursing Service as a sister. She was in Adelaide until 1941 when she as part of the 2/7th Australian General Hospital went to the middle east on RMS Aquitania. Bonnin was stationed in Palestine until she went to Tripoli to assist the 2/11th Field Ambulance.

The 1942 Battles of El Alamein found her back with the 2/7th Australian General Hospital which was then operating a Casualty Clearing Station in Buseilli in Egypt. In 1943, nurses were recognised as an integral part of the Australian army and she was given the rank of Captain.

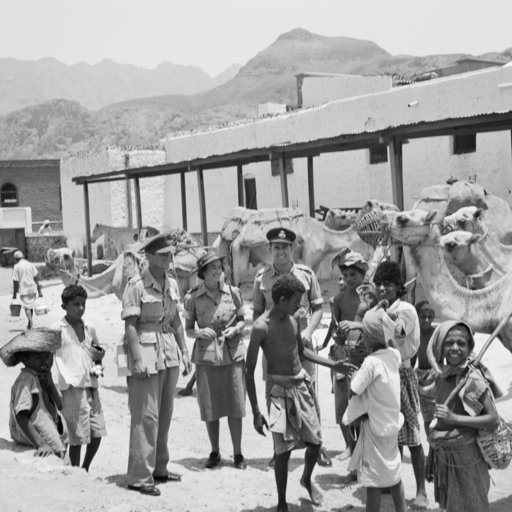
Captain Kath Bonnin in Aden in 1946 as part of the Victory contingent

Captain Kath Bonnin was mentioned in despatches and she was awarded an Associate Royal Red Cross in the 1945 King's Birthday Honours together with four others, Ellen Fenner, Jessie Margaret Langham, Ethel Youman and Martha Hateley.

In 1946 she was sent to London as part of the victory contingent on board HMAS Shropshire.

After the war she worked at the Royal Adelaide Hospital, specialising in looking at electrocardiograms, until 1964. Bonnin died in 1985 in North Adelaide.
