= Ballarat Base Hospital =

Coordinates: 37.5594°S 143.8469°E

- Ballarat Health Services
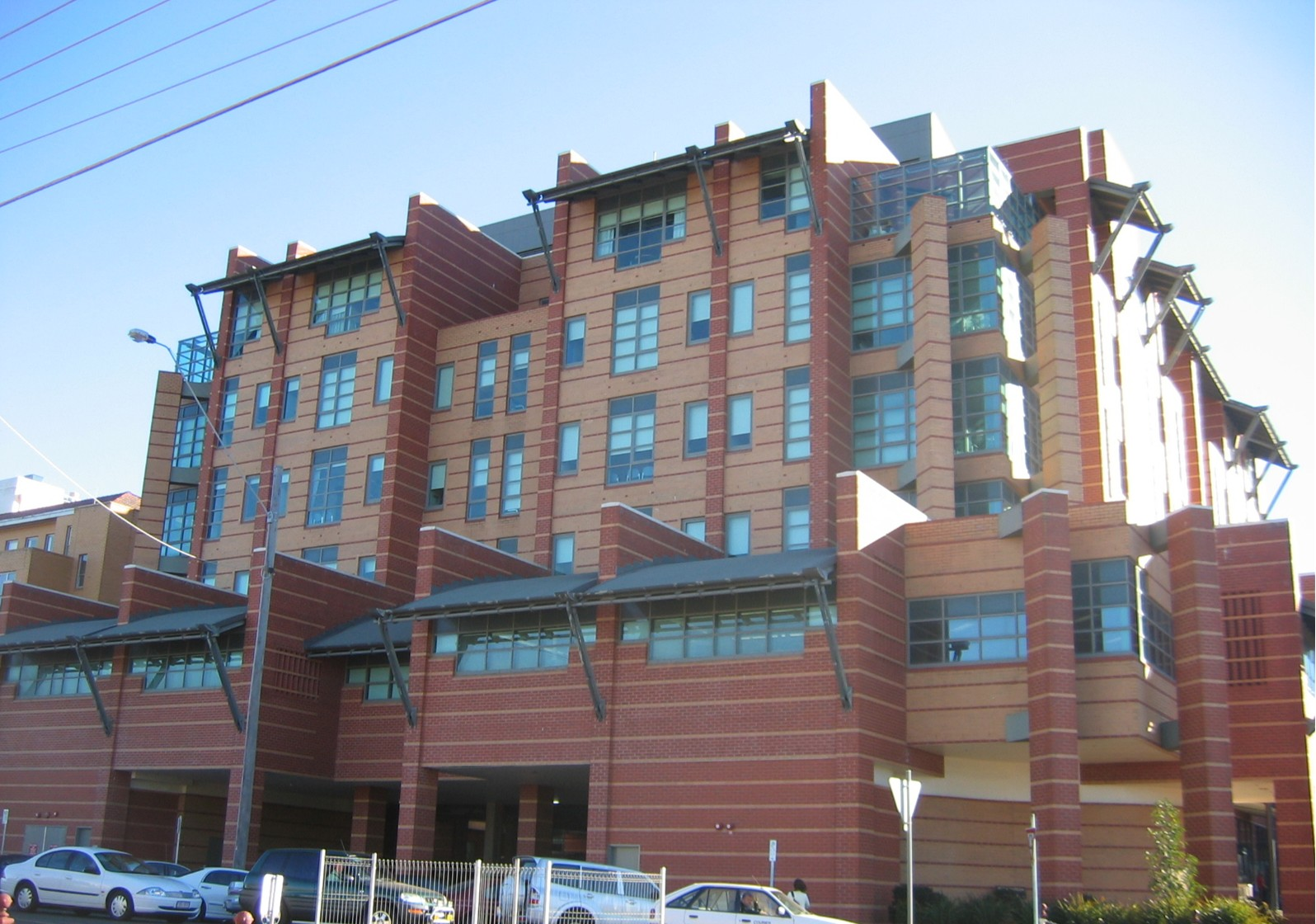
- Ballarat Hospital

Geography
- Location: Ballarat, Victoria, Australia

Organisation
- Care system: Public Medicare (Australia)
- Type: Regional
- Affiliated university: Deakin University

Services
- Emergency department: Yes
- Beds: 785

History
- Opened: 1855

Links
- Website: www.bhs.org.au
- Lists: Hospitals in Australia

The Ballarat Base Hospital is a hospital located in Ballarat, Victoria, Australia. It is a public hospital operated by Ballarat Health Services. Ballarat Health Services employs approximately 4000 staff at the Base Hospital, the Queen Elizabeth Centre 1 km to the south-west, and 13 off-site facilities in the surrounding area.

== History ==
During the gold rush of the 1850s, the Government Camp provided medical support mainly for officers and not for miners and the general community. However, the wounded individuals at the Eureka Stockade in 1854 received varying levels of attention, which highlighted the need for a dedicated hospital. As a result, the construction of a hospital began a year later.

In 1994, the five-story Henry Bolte wing, designed by architects Bates Smart, was completed.

Three years later, in 1997, the Ballarat Base Hospital merged with the Queen Elizabeth Centre and the Grampians Psychiatric Service to form Ballarat Health Services.

== Notable staff ==
Jessie Margaret Langham ARRA OBE was matron from 1947 to 1967.

== Specialties ==
- Cardiology
- Emergency medicine
- Gastroenterology
- Infectious disease medicine
- Lower gastrointestinal surgery
- Nephrology
- Otorhinolaryngology
- Upper gastrointestinal surgery
- Vascular surgery
- Oncology
- Pediatrics
- Plastic and Reconstructive Surgery

== See also ==
- List of hospitals in Australia
