= Worker standards board =

Labor standard related concept of local determination about acceptable working conditions

The Worker Standards Board, Wage Board or Industry Committee aims to improve wages and working conditions for all workers within a specific industry. When implemented along with other regional labor policies, such as paid family leave, the Worker Standards Board is a useful alternative or supplement to a collective bargaining agreement and a formal labor union, when the situation does not support a union.

The Board can create industry-specific standards above the legislated minimum labor policies. The fair competition created by an industry labor standard can benefit employers, as well as employees, because, when enforced, it creates a level playing field. The Worker Standards Board is one tool that helps achieve a situation in which workers are treated with dignity and respect, regardless of class, gender, or race.

== Definition ==
The Worker Standards Board is a local governmental or national body that sets labor standards, such as minimum wage rates, benefits, and workplace standards for an entire occupation, sector, or industry. The Board includes representatives of the public, workers, and employers. The Board is especially useful in industries with low union density and where traditional collective bargaining is unusually difficult.

Depending on design, the Board can have multiple roles including: to hold hearings that create labor policy recommendations, to conduct education outreach that increases public participation, and to conduct research to identify industry-centric labor practices that are in dispute.

The Worker Standards Board supports labor standards on a regional level. There are similarly-named boards that are more broadly conceived and function at a national level. Some examples include the Swedish Committee on Industry and Trade (Sweden), and the Norwegian Standing Committee on Business and Industry. In other models, workers participate on corporate boards of directors, such as the OECD country practice of worker representation on corporate boards of directors. These national and corporate boards are different in concept from regional industry-specific Worker Standards Boards.

== Background ==
As an example of the need for a Worker Standards Board take the United States Fair Labor Standards Act. When it was originally passed in 1938, the act contained a provision with racial overtones that exempted domestic workers and agricultural workers. Later, the further exclusion of academic workers was added. Workers in these industries have had difficult labor conditions without FLSA protections for work hours, minimum wage, and collective bargaining. The early FLSA had Worker Standards Boards termed “Industry Committees” intended to fill these exclusion gaps and reinforce industries and local regions as needed. That national-level network of boards eventually dissolved, but successful labor policies from those worker standards boards are still in practice today. For example, it was a Worker Standards Board's recommended public policy that resulted in package labeling regulations, which industry now widely supports.

== Composition ==
=== Structure ===
The Worker Standards Board is structured around a strong purpose statement, often defined as a Workers Bill of Rights, and a broad mandate, such as to improve wages and working conditions for all workers throughout the economy.

=== Function and organization ===
The core function of a Worker Standards Board is to raise standards for workers throughout an industry by making public policy recommendations. The Board’s recommendations are intended to be voted on by a government body. The Board differs from most commissions because their recommendations carry significant weight and trigger governmental review and action.

Its organization is typically a tri-party Board with a steering committee of representatives from three stakeholder groups: workers and labor unions, employer firms and associations, and governance (the public).

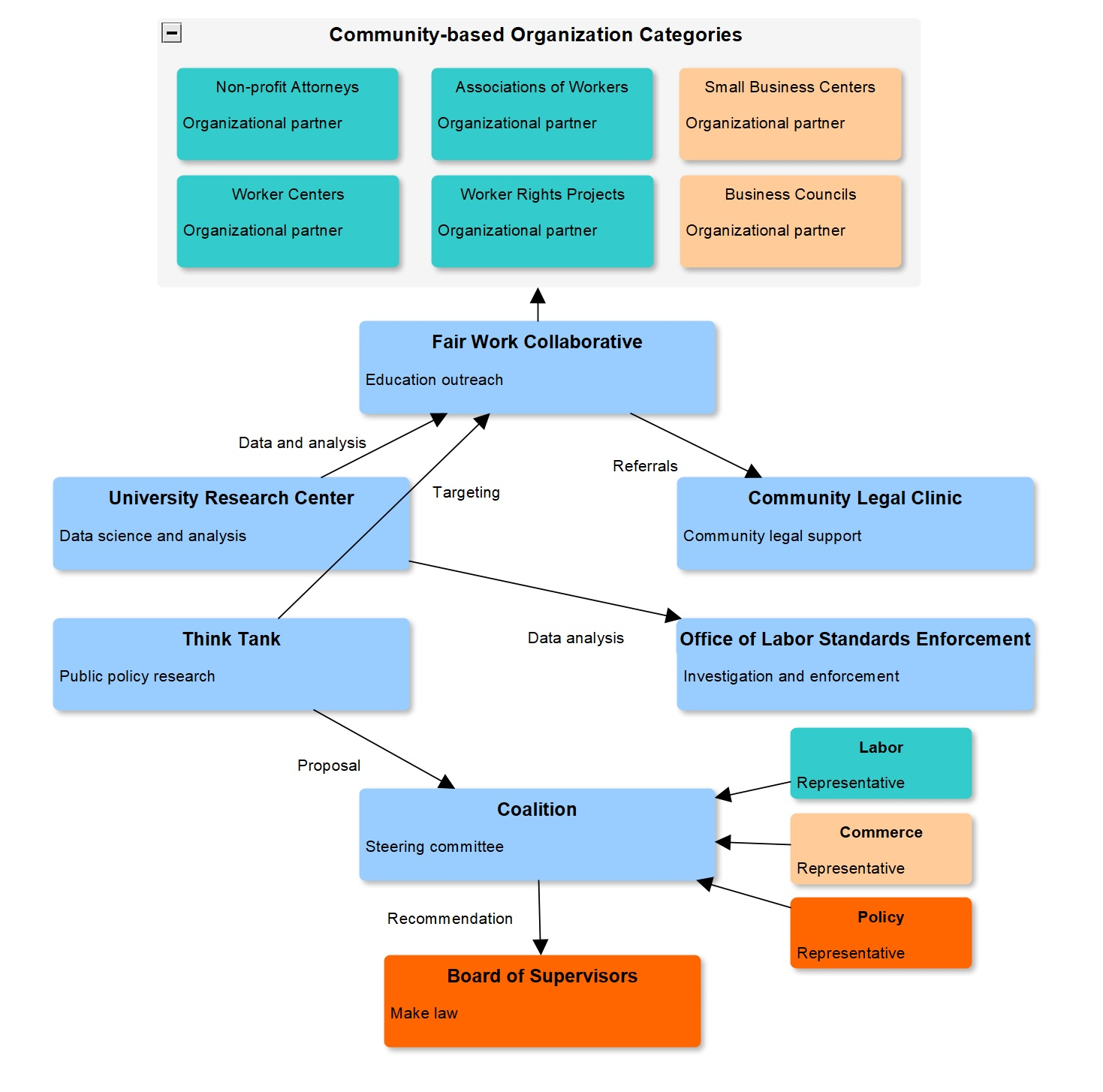
Workers Standard Board generic model: the organizational structure represented by connecting arrows is individualized for specifics of each Board implementation.

There is variation, however, within the Board, six core offices typically provide Board functions. These offices are often a network of separate organizations working together collaboratively.

- Steering committee
- Public policy research
- Data science and analysis
- Education outreach
- Investigation and enforcement
- Community legal support

Worker Standards Boards provide specific and important services. First, they encourage public participation and require that board members are selected in a representative and democratic way. For a Board to function, the related elected public policymakers must provide it with the authority to gather relevant information through hearings and investigations. A Board also needs authority to issue recommendations, including a process of quick review and adoption of Board recommendations. The offices must be adequately resourced institutions that are permanently staffed.

A fair work center is within the worker standards board core. A fair work center is a service hub for workers to connect with community resources, find representation, learn their rights under the law, and learn how to exercise those legal rights. Fair work centers aim to provide these services in multiple languages.

A Worker Standards Board's core office function can include ensuring that employers are held accountable for labor standards. The Board registers and monitors union avoidance firms and their agents and other contra-worker organizations. With a data science center, often housed at a university, the Board makes public the violation records of employers and analyzes trends in violations. Last, the Board contains an office of labor standards enforcement tasked with investigating and enforcing labor standards, including removing an employer's permission to conduct business.

=== Activities and processes ===
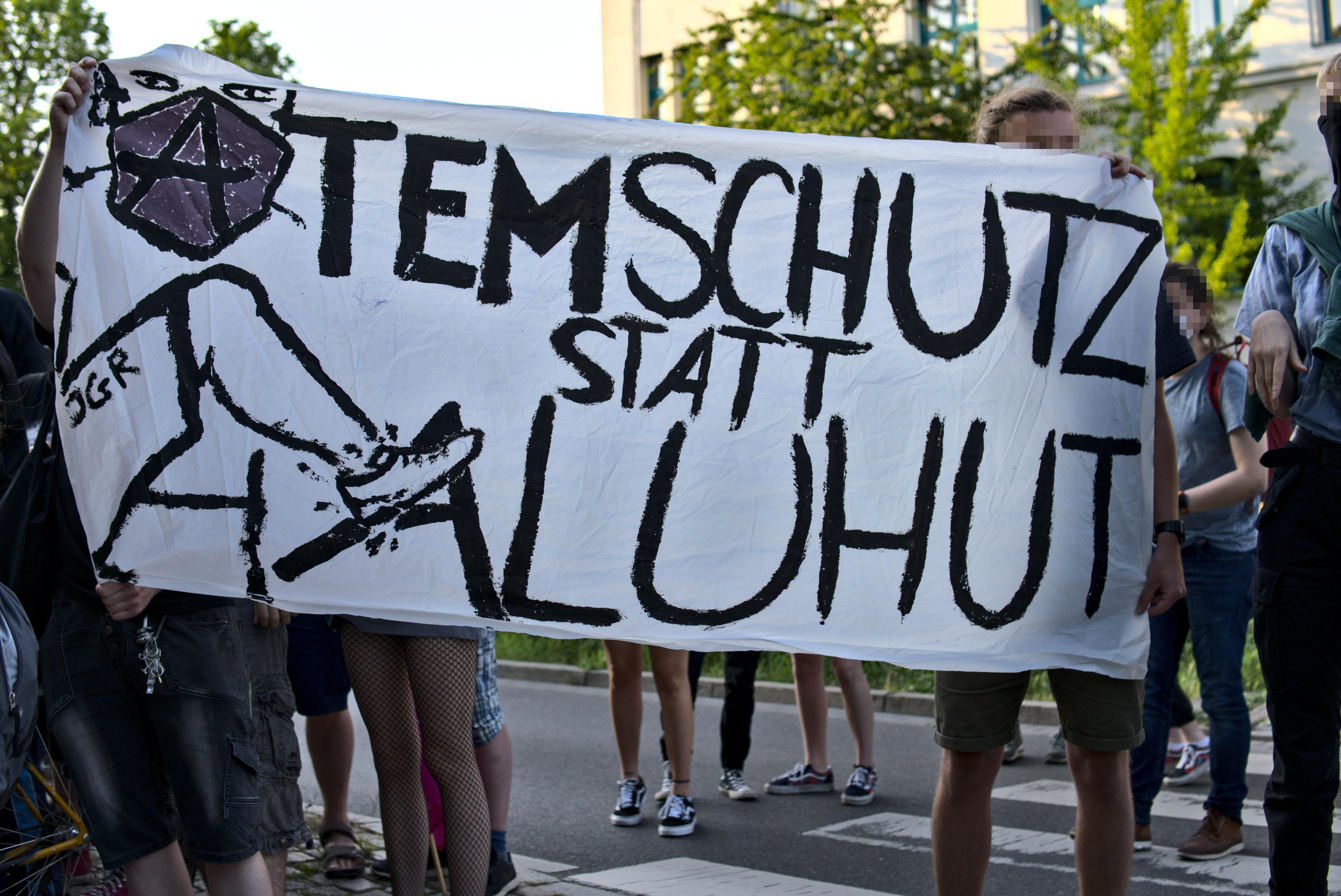
Worker protest for mining respiratory protection over basic material. Banner reading: "respiratory protection over aluminum hats" Germany on June 22, 2020

Important activities of the Worker Standards Board are to encourage worker participation in the decision-making process, support a representative method for selecting a membership, and to provide workers with the right to participate. In action, that can take the form of mandating that workers have time off to attend Board hearings, holding public hearings, and publicly posting notifications. The Board implements processes, such as making regular updates on previous policy decisions every few years. Board recommendations are made approximately once per year. While workers organize around and participate in Board activities, there is also a need to create strong enforcement mechanisms to ensure employer compliance. One of those mechanisms is giving funding to worker organizers to help ensure compliance with Board decisions as co-enforcers.

=== Limitations ===
The Workers Standards Board model contains a limitation in that, unlike a labor union where the power rests with the workers, the Board's power rests at the discretion of a government agency. Despite that limitation, the Board model provides a benefit in the absence of a labor union. A hedge is that a Board recommendation can not be altered, they are accepted and can only be vetoed for failure to meet statutory standards: only two recommendations were vetoed during the era of the FLSA style of Worker Standards Board.

A concern is the Worker Standards Board model is susceptible to influence and could come to form the function of a 'Company union:' a union type made illegal in the United States under the 1947 Labor Management Relations Act (Taft–Hartley Act). Prior to Taft–Hartley, company unions were created by employers to compete with and displace labor unions.

== Examples ==
The concept of a Worker Standards Board exists internationally and throughout time, often gaining in popularity during political unrest, as demonstrated by the following examples:

- There has been widespread labor unrest in Indonesia, and Worker Standards Boards show an inclination towards supporting social justice goals on behalf of Indonesian company workers.
- During the partitioning of Bengal and formation of the new West Bengal state, wage rates in the tea industry fell to deficient levels. Worker Standards Boards formed and set need-based (living wage) minimum wages for the tea industry.
- In the early 2000s, attempts to correct for gaps in the United States Fair Labor Standards Act (FLSA) created a resurgence in North American interest in the Worker Standards Board model. That resurgence resulted in a series of new Boards in large metropolitan regions that addressed difficult labor issues in specific industries. In 2015, New York created a Fast Food Worker Standards Board to raise the fast-food industry minimum wage to $15 an hour. In 2018, Seattle created a Domestic Worker Standards Board for similar reasons. Again, in 2019, New York passed legislation granting farm laborers collective bargaining rights and establishing a Farm Laborer Worker Standards Board.
- A derivation of the Worker Standards Board is the Public Health Council. During the global COVID-19 pandemic in 2020, Los Angeles County passed legislation that allowed workers to monitor adherence to virus-prevention protocols: the LA County Department of Public Health certified community and union organizations into a Fair Work type collaborative. The employees active on the health council are hopefully on employer-paid time: expected to be two hours per week for each of a minimum of two employees, and up to 10% of the employees (representative sample on the council). The program is limited to apparel manufacturing, warehousing, and restaurant industry sectors. The first board recommendation to policymakers was to prepare an anti-retaliation ordinance, which was unanimously approved as Board recommendations typically are.
- In China, the long-term role of the Workers Standard Board could over time show a tendency to creep in scope such that, in some instances, separate interests reduced the self-sustaining intention of the organization structure.
- The United Kingdom labor law included the use of Worker Standards Board style Wage Councils until their abolishment in 1993 by the Trade Union Reform and Employment Rights Act: an act that was counterproductive at best.

== See also ==
- Labor rights
- Human rights
- Trade union
- Bargaining unit
- Works council
