= Jumbunna =

Jumbunna Victoria
- Coordinates: 38°28′S 145°46′E
- Population: 150 (SAL 2021)
- Postcode(s): 3951
- Location: 127 km (79 mi) SE of Melbourne; 22 km (14 mi) W of Leongatha; 7 km (4 mi) SW of Korumburra
- LGA(s): South Gippsland Shire
- State electorate(s): Gippsland South
- Federal division(s): Monash

Jumbunna is a town in South Gippsland, Victoria, Australia. The name is taken from the eastern Kulin language of the Bunnerong tribe and means "a place to meet and talk".

Today the community of Jumbunna consists of 13 houses and about 30 residents in the township and 29 houses and 50 residents in the surrounding rural area.

Farming (mainly in fat lamb, beef and dairy industries) continues and is now complemented by a diverse range of small businesses.

== History ==
Jumbunna was once a thriving coal mining township. Land was opened up for selection in 1878. The Jumbunna Coal Company was registered in 1890, after T.W. Horsley discovered a seam in the area. The Company began operations in 1894.

A Jumbunna Post Office opened on 1 May 1890. This was renamed Glen Alvie in 1893 when the railway arrived and a new Jumbunna office was opened near the station. This office closed in 1976.

In its hey-day in 1901 the town boasted 153 houses and a population of approximately 800, many of whom lived in tents. The first house in Jumbunna ("Cora Lynn") was built in 1880 by John Glew.

The shopping precinct at that time had amongst its businesses three grocers, two butchers, two bakers, two drapers, two boot repairers, one fancy goods shop, one barber, one wine saloon, one hotel, one iron mongery, three blacksmiths and several boarding houses, as well as a coffee salon. The Jumbunna General Store opened in 1893 and closed in 1976. (The Store building now has Category 1 heritage listing with the South Gippsland Shire Council.) There was also a school, at first using the Jumbunna Hall, which started in 1894. It continued in a new building from 1900 to 1977. Portable buildings were then used until 1986 after the sale of the school building.

The Korumburra-Jumbunna Railway was constructed in 1893, was extended to Outtrim in 1896 and closed in 1953.

Electricity was introduced to the town in 1930.

After the miners' strike of 1903 to 1904, the town began to decline and many houses were shifted by bullock dray to Wonthaggi.

The records show that the single stream mine continued producing until 1939. (From 1931-1939 it was operated by locals, including the Durkin family.) The top seam was re-opened in 1947 and worked by the Axford Leighton Syndicate until 1962.

During the entire operation of the Jumbunna mine 1,364,376 tons of coal were produced.

The coal mine, railway embankment, and railway line viaduct are listed in the Victorian Heritage Inventory.

== See also ==
- Jumbunna railway station
- Outtrim railway line
