= Queen Elizabeth Centre, Ballarat =

Queen Elizabeth Centre

Geography
- Location: Ballarat, Victoria, Australia
- Coordinates: 37.5635°S 143.843°E

Organisation
- Network: Ballarat Health Service

History
- Former names: Ballarat Benevolent Asylum; Queen Elizabeth Geriatric Centre
- Opened: February 20, 1860

The Queen Elizabeth Centre (QEC) in Ballarat, Victoria is a part of the Ballarat Health Service.

== History ==
The QEC was formed in 1859 and opened on 20 February 1860 as the "Ballarat Benevolent Asylum". It became the Queen Elizabeth Geriatric Centre sometime before 1960 and is now called the Queen Elizabeth Centre.

In 1997, the QEC merged with the Ballarat Base Hospital and the Grampians Psychiatric Service to form the Ballarat Health Service.
