= Coal Creek, Victoria =

Coordinates: 38°26′26″S 145°49′53″E

Coal Creek
- Town
- Country: Australia
- State: Victoria
- LGA: South Gippsland Shire
- Location: 120 km (75 mi) SE of Melbourne; 15 km (9.3 mi) W of Leongatha

Government
  - State electorate: Gippsland South
  - Federal division: Monash
- Postcode: 3950

Coal Creek is a small recreated town in the South Gippsland area of Victoria, Australia, now essentially a suburb of Korumburra.

Black coal was discovered in the area in 1872, and the region subsequently developed an important coal mining industry. The mine at Coal Creek operated from the 1880s to the 1958, when operations ceased. A post office was open from 1894 to 1897.

Historic buildings and history on show

Coal Creek Heritage Village, a 15-hectare open-air museum, was established at the site in 1974. Now called Coal Creek Community Park and Museum, the park became an accredited museum in 2014. It is home to many local groups and organisations and has a large education program. Several events are held during the year which have proved extremely popular with local people and the surrounding communities.

== See also ==
- Korumburra
- Nyora
