= Korumburra =

- Town
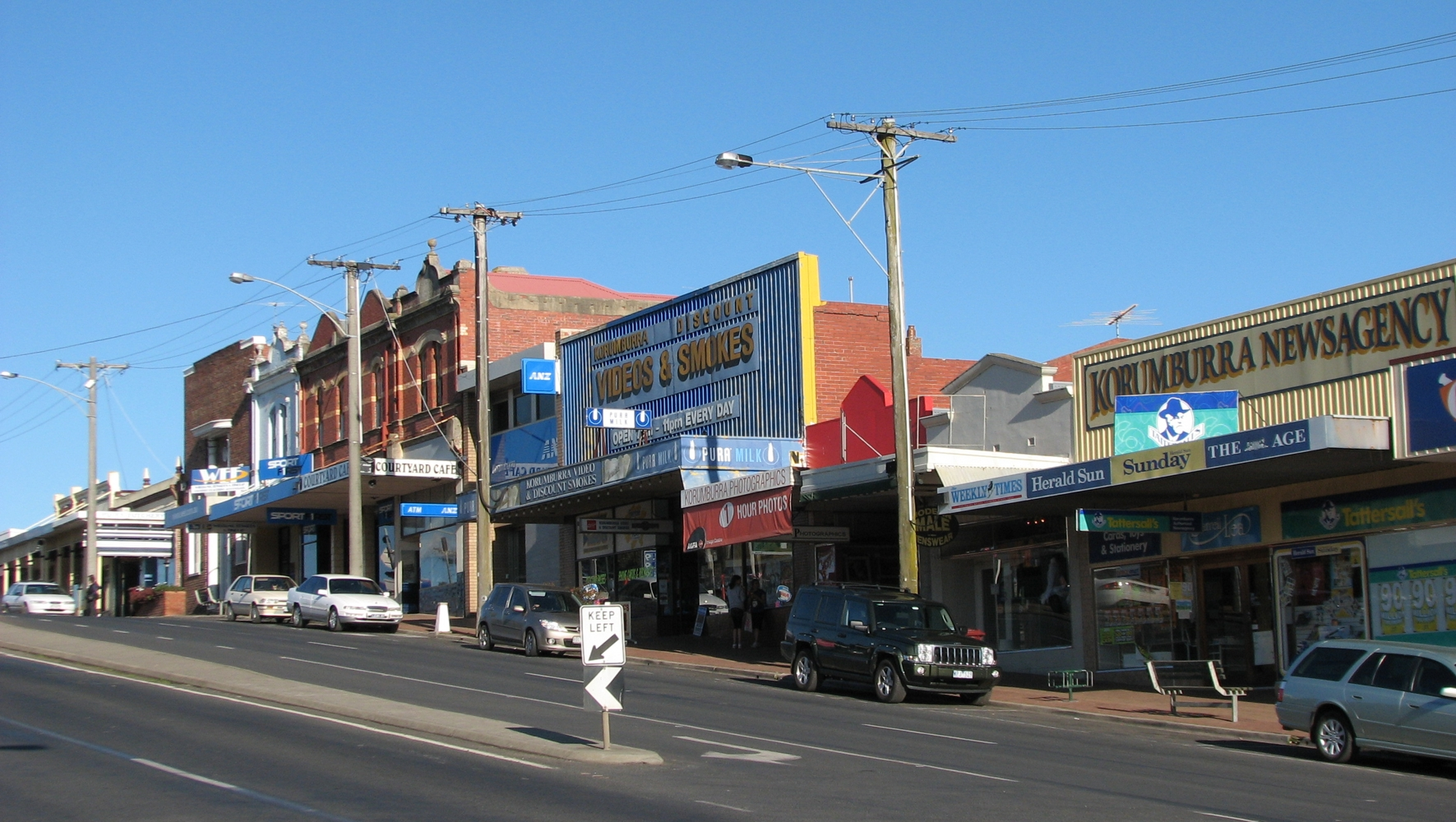
- Commercial Street

- Coordinates: 38°26′0″S 145°49′0″E
- Country: Australia
- State: Victoria
- LGA: South Gippsland Shire
- Location: 120 km (75 mi) SE of Melbourne; 15 km (9.3 mi) W of Leongatha

Government
  - State electorate: Gippsland South
  - Federal division: Monash
- Elevation: 225 m (738 ft)

Population
  - Total: 3,869 (2021 census)
- Postcode: 3950
- County: Buln Buln
- Mean max temp: 17.8 °C (64.0 °F)
- Mean min temp: 8.0 °C (46.4 °F)
- Annual rainfall: 1,135 mm (44.7 in)

Korumburra /ˌkʌrəmˈbʌrə/ is a town in the Australian state of Victoria. It is located on the South Gippsland Highway, 120 kilometres (75 mi) south-east of Melbourne, in the South Gippsland Shire local government area. At the 2021 census Korumburra had an urban population of 3,639. Surrounded by rolling green hills, the town is 227 metres (745 ft) above the sea level of coastal Inverloch, about 28 km (17 mi) away.

Established around 1889, the town's prosperity grew for many years based on coal mining, which lasted until around 1962. A coal-miners' strike affected the town in 1937, during the Depression years.

== History ==
The Post Office in the area opened on 1 September 1884, and moved to the township on the railway survey line on 1 November 1889, the existing office being renamed Glentress.

The railway arrived in 1891, and the now heritage listed railway station was built in 1908.

The town enjoyed a wave of migration of European migrants, who added to the town's growth and culture. Antonio Radovick "Father of Korumburra" was the most successful Croatian pioneer in Victoria, who contributed to the start and growth of the town in the 1890s and 1900s. He built the town's first hotel in 1889, and there is a street bearing his name nearby.

The township has a common incorrect spelling of its name being Kurrumburra, with 45 records shown in the World War Two Nominal Roll.

=== Coal-mining ===
Korumburra owed its early prosperity to coal mining; 2,000,000 tonnes of coal were produced by the Korumburra coalfields from 1893 to 1962.

A coal-miners' strike affected the town in 1937, during the years of the Great Depression, when 30 men suddenly went on strike on 8 September 1937, demanding that their employers accept the recent determination of the wages board that raised the wage by 4 shillings and 5 shillings. The miners at the Sunbeam Colliery in Korumburra stayed below ground, and management refused to allow other employees to enter the premises to relieve the striking miners so that they could access food and supplies. This was the first "stay-in" coal strike in Victoria, which came about after management posted notices terminating the services of all employees on and after 9 September, the date on which a new Wages Board determination came into operation-had been posted at the pit head. By 11 September, over 120 miners were withholding their labour at three coal pits, after the Sunbeam miners had been dismissed and paid off. The strike spread to other states after the federal government refused to intervene, and by 13 September, every mine in Australia was closed, apart from in Western Australia. The dispute was eventually settled in November 1937.

== Today ==
At the 2021 census Korumburra had an urban population of 3,639.

Korumburra is known as the "Heritage Centre of South Gippsland". It is the home of Coal Creek Community Park and Museum. This village depicts life in the area over the period from the 1870s to 1920s, as the town rapidly expanded following the discovery of a coal seam. The outdoor museum covers 27 hectares of bushland, including 53 exhibits. These include the Giant Earthworm, National Bank, Anzac exhibit, Mining exhibits, Dairy exhibit at the Boston Carriageworks and Railway Museum. A tramway runs on weekends around the lower end of the park encompassing an old-time farm and bush oval. Many local organisations use the Park and environs and special events are held during the year.

Other town attractions include the Olympic pool (open November–March), a two-court basketball stadium and art gallery. The town's main industries include dairy and beef. The region is home to the world's largest earthworms. The town is also home to Burra Foods, a dairy company.

The town in conjunction with neighbouring township Bena has an Australian Rules football team competing in the West Gippsland Football League.

The town has a soccer team, the Korumburra City Soccer Club, competing in the Gippsland Soccer League.

Soccer has a long and storied history in Korumburra, owing to the vast immigration that took place in the town at the beginning of the 20th century. The town's first time - Korumburra Rangers - was formed after a meeting at the Korumburra's Austral Hotel, predominantly featuring recently arrived men from England and Scotland. The club played on "...Mr Greville's Paddock off Shilcock Road" and joined the Wonthaggi and District Association's four-team league.

Golfers play at the course of the Korumburra Golf Club on Warragul Road. (In the winter of 2005, Korumburra was blanketed in snow for the first time in almost twenty years. Local residents were seen skiing the tenth fairway at the Korumburra Golf Club.)

The town is now being developed with large areas of former farm land being developed for new residential estates, which within the next ten years will expand the size and population of the township by 75 to 100 percent.

Town is also home to the award winning Korumburra Middle Hotel, which in recent years has won a variety of state levels awards including Best Parma, Best outdoor experience & function space and Regional Overall Hotel of the Year

In the first half of 2025, the town found itself at the centre of global attention during a ten-week murder trial. Erin Patterson, the perpetrator, faced three charges of murder and another of attempted murder, which she was ultimately convicted of. The case stemmed from a family lunch in 2023, during which her guests were served a beef Wellington containing toxic death cap mushrooms. The incident claimed the lives of her two in-laws, Don and Gail Patterson, as well as Gail's sister, Heather Wilkinson; the latter's husband Ian, was the only one to survive the ordeal.

== Transport ==
Korumburra was formerly situated along the South Gippsland railway corridor that operated to its terminus at Yarram in the early 1980s and Leongatha in the mid-1990s. A V/Line road coach service replaced the rail service on 24 July 1993, running between Melbourne and Yarram. However, since the closure of the South Gippsland rail line by the Kennett Victorian government on 14 December 1994, the South and West Gippsland Transport Group represented by the local council are campaigning for the rail services to be reinstated beyond the current terminus at Cranbourne by the 2020s. The line beyond Leongatha is being used as a rail trail for public use and also the former Wonthaggi line. Dandenong - Cranbourne is being used by the Melbourne Suburban train company, while the section beyond Cranbourne - Nyora is in an unusable state for trains to operate and is yet to have its fate decided.

== Earthquakes ==
On 6 March 2009, an earthquake registering 4.7 on the Richter scale was recorded 7 km (4 mi) west of Korumburra. A second magnitude 4.7 tremor was recorded two weeks later on 18 March 2009; the epicentre was 5 km (3 mi) north of the town. No damage was reported.

As of 2 April 2009, fifteen earthquakes and aftershocks have been recorded around the town during 2009.

On 5 July 2011, a magnitude 4.4 earthquake with the epicentre on Korumburra was felt over much of suburban Melbourne as well.

== Environmental issues ==
=== Wastewater issue ===
Early 2021, South Gippsland Water's wastewater treatment plant started discharging wastewater to Foster Creek because its processing capacity exceeded at that time. This discharge caused an increase in odour levels.

== In film ==
The town features in Richard Lowenstein's 1984 award-winning film Strikebound, about a coal-miner's strike in the town in 1937.

== Notable people ==
Notable people from Korumburra include:

- Air Vice Marshal Francis Masson (Frank) Bladin, CB, CBE, distinguished airman in World War II and the post-war period.
- Bruce Hungerford, pianist
- Jessie Margaret Langham, nurse
- Ken Lay, former Chief Commissioner of Victoria Police
- William Langham Proud CBE (28 January 1909 – December 1984), architect and co-founder in Geelong of Apex Clubs of Australia.
- Lieutenant General Sir Stanley George Savige, KBE, CB, DSO, MC, ED distinguished soldier in World War I and World War II, founder of Legacy
- Jill Singer, journalist, columnist and television presenter
- Captain Boomerang (George "Digger" Harkness), fictional super-villain appearing in DC comics from the town of Kurrumburra
- Ron Strykert, co-founder, lead guitarist and songwriter for Men at Work.

== See also ==
- Korumburra railway station
