= H class =

H class or Class H may refer to:

== Railway locomotives ==
- Barry Railway Class H, 0-8-2T tank locomotives
- NBR H class, 4-4-2 steam locomotives
- NZR H class, steam locomotives used by the New Zealand Railways Department
- Metropolitan Railway H Class, 4-4-4T steam locomotives
- Palestine Railways H class, steam locomotives
- SECR H class, 0-4-4T locomotives designed by Harry Wainwright
- South Australian Railways H class, 4-4-0 steam locomotives
- Taff Vale Railway H class, 3 0-6-0T steam tank locomotives
- Tasmanian Government Railways H class (1889), 0-4-0WT steam locomotives
- Tasmanian Government Railways H class (1951), 4-8-2 steam locomotives
- Victorian Railways H class, 4-8-4 steam locomotives used in Australia
- Victorian Railways H class (1877), 4-4-0 steam locomotives
- Victorian Railways H class (diesel), diesel locomotives
- WAGR H class, steam locomotives
- WAGR H class (diesel), diesel electric locomotives

== Trams ==
- H type Adelaide tram
- H-class Melbourne tram
- H-class Sydney tram

== Ship types ==
- H-class destroyer, British destroyer class which served during World War II
- H-class battleship proposals, multiple planned, but cancelled, German battleship classes during World War II
- H-class lifeboat, RNLI hovercraft lifeboats
- H-class submarine (disambiguation), multiple classes

== Other uses ==
- H-class blimp, observation airships built for the U.S. Navy
- Class H, a class of electronic amplifiers

== See also ==
- H (disambiguation)
