= H (disambiguation) =

H is the eighth letter of the Latin alphabet.

H may also refer to:

== Musical symbols ==
- H number, Harry Halbreich reference mechanism for music by Honegger and Martinů
- H, B (musical note)
- H, B major
- Hoboken catalogue, classification of the works by Franz Joseph Haydn.

== People ==
- H. (noble) (died after 1279), an unidentified nobleman in the Kingdom of Hungary who served as master of the horse
- H. (1900–1995), British activist and economist Edgar Hardcastle
- H (born 1957), British guitarist Adrian Smith
- H (born 1976), British singer Ian Watkins (Steps)
- h (born 1959), British vocalist Steve Hogarth
- H (born 1981/82), one of the attackers in the Sydney gang rapes
- H Waldman (born 1972), American basketball player
- Kalevi Heikkinen (1911–1940), Finnish war correspondent whose pen name was H

== Science and mathematics ==
- h, hour
- h, hecto-, the SI prefix for hundred or 10^{2}

=== Biology ===
- Haplogroup H
  - Haplogroup H (mtDNA), human mitochondrial DNA
  - Haplogroup H (Y-DNA), human Y-chromosome DNA
- ATC code H Systemic hormonal preparations, excluding sex hormones and insulins, a section of the Anatomical Therapeutic Chemical Classification System
- Fay and Wu's H, a statistical test used in DNA analysis

=== Chemistry ===
- Hydrogen, symbol H, a chemical element
- H, code for a formulation of sulfur mustard
- H (or His), an abbreviation for the amino acid histidine

=== Computer science ===
- Language H, procedural programming language
- H or h, suffixed to denote hexadecimal in Intel-derived assembly languages
- .h, the filename extension for the C include directive called header

=== Linguistics ===
- h, the International Phonetic Alphabet symbol for a voiceless glottal fricative sound
- H or high, the high-prestige register in a diglossia

=== Mathematics ===
- H, the upper half-plane of the complex numbers
- H, the Heaviside step function
- h, impulse response in LTI system theory
- H, system function, system response, or transfer function in LTI system theory

=== Physics and cosmology ===
==== Constants ====
- h, Planck constant
- H, Hubble constant
- h, dimensionless Hubble constant

==== Measures ====
- H, absolute magnitude in the context of the Solar system
- H (as in ΔH), magnitude of enthalpy
- h, convective heat transfer coefficient
- H, magnetic field intensity

==== Other uses in physics ====
- H, symbol for the Henry (unit), the SI derived unit of inductance
- H^{0}, the symbol of the Higgs boson

=== Planets ===
- H, distortion of symbol for Uranus
- h, distortion of symbol for Saturn

=== Other uses in science ===
- h-index, an author-level metric of the productivity and citation impact of the publications of a scientist or scholar

== Arts and media ==
=== Film and TV ===
- H (1990 film), a 1990 Canadian film
- H (2002 film), a 2002 Korean film
- H. (2014 film), a 2014 American film by Rania Attieh and Daniel Garcia
- H (TV series), a 1998-2002 French TV series
- H, the production code for the 1964 Doctor Who serial The Reign of Terror
- H, a codename used to refer to an anonymous individual in the police procedural drama Line of Duty
- "H", the fifth episode of the sixth series of Taskmaster that aired in 2018
- The H logo used for Globo’s midday news program Jornal Hoje

=== Music ===
- h, a 1990 compilation album by Hitomi (singer)
- H, a 1980 album by Bob James (musician)
- H (Ayumi Hamasaki EP), 2002
- H (Lee Hae-ri EP), 2017
- "H." (song), a song by Tool on their 1996 Ænima album

=== Other media ===
- H (magazine)
- Revista H, a monthly Mexican men's magazine
- "H" Is for Homicide, the eighth novel in Sue Grafton's "Alphabet mystery" series, published in 1991

== Transportation ==
- Saviem H, a range of medium/heavy cab-over trucks
- Farmall H, a medium-sized crop tractor produced by International Harvester

=== Trains ===
- H (S-train), a train service in Metropolitan Copenhagen
- H, Rockaway Park Shuttle subway service in New York
- Line H of the Buenos Aires Subte
- Tokyo Metro Hibiya Line, a subway service operated by the Tokyo Metro, labeled
- , the official West Japan Railway Company service symbol for the JR Tōzai Line and Katamachi Line

== Other uses ==
- Street slang or argot for: Heroin
- H, sexual content or activity, associated with Japanese "Hentai"
- H, a Hitachi mobile phone
- Hurricane tie, used in construction
- Conservative Party of Norway (Høyre)
- The military designation for helicopters, such as the UH-60 Blackhawk and AH-64 Apache
- H, a symbol for a heliport
- H, the international license plate code of Hungary
- Hit (baseball)
- Hotel, the military time zone code for UTC+08:00
- H, a harder grade of pencil lead
- Semarang, Salatiga, Kendal and Demak (vehicle registration prefix H)

== See also ==
- Aitch (disambiguation)
- H class (disambiguation)
- H band (disambiguation)
- ^H, characters representing the backspace control code
- հ, an Armenian letter
- ㅐ, a Korean letter
- Ħ (H with stroke), a Maltese letter
- Н, a Cyrillic capital letter "En"
- Һ, a Cyrillic letter
- Η, a Greek capital letter "Eta"
