= Tasmanian Government Railways H class =

Tasmanian Government Railways H class may refer to:

- Tasmanian Government Railways H class (1889)
- Tasmanian Government Railways H class (1951)
