= South Australian Railways J class =

South Australian Railways 0-6-0 broad gauge steam locomotives

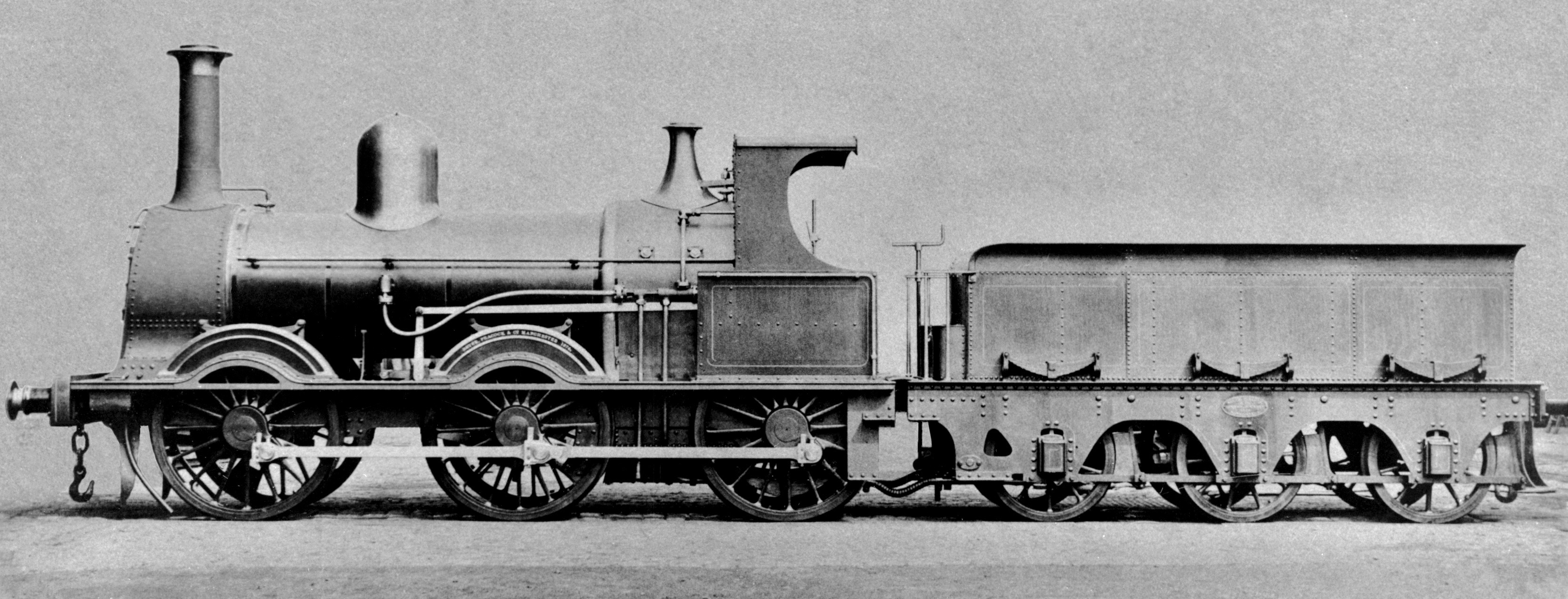
- Builder's photo of the South Australian Railways J class locomotive
Type and origin
- Power type: Steam
- Builder: Beyer, Peacock and Company
- Order number: 3186; tenders 3187
- Build date: 1872
- Total produced: 2
- Rebuilder: South Australian Railways
- Rebuild date: 1890 (no. 32); 1891 (no. 33); 1919 (nos 32 & 33)
- Number rebuilt: 2
Specifications
- Configuration
  - Whyte: 0-6-0
  - UIC: C
- Gauge: 5 ft 3 in (1600 mm)
- Driver dia.: 5 feet 1/2 inch (1537 mm)
- Length: Over buffers: 43 ft 9 in (13.335 m)
- Width: 6 ft 6 in (1.981 m)
- Height: 13 ft 2 in (4.013 m)
- Axle load: 11 tons 4 cwt (long, UK) (11.177 tonnes)
- Total weight: 57 tons 2 cwt (58.017 tonnes)
- Fuel type: Coal
- Fuel capacity: 4 tons 11 cwt (long, UK) (11.736 tonnes)
- Tender cap.: 1535 UK gallons (6978 litres)
- Firebox
  - Grate area: ~15 square feet (~1.394 m^{2})
- Boiler pressure: 130 psi (896 kPa)
- Heating surface
  - Firebox: As delivered: 80.6 sq ft (7.49 m^{2}); As rebuilt: 90 sq ft (8.36 m^{2})
  - Tubes: As delivered: 904 sq ft (83.98 m^{2}); As rebuilt: 923.3 sq ft (85.78 m^{2})
- Cylinders: 2
- Cylinder size: 17 in × 24 in (432 mm × 610 mm)
Performance figures
- Tractive effort: 12,774 lbs (56.822 kiloNewtons)
Career
- Operators: South Australian Railways
- Class: I (briefly) then J
- Number in class: 2
- Numbers: 32 and 33
- Delivered: April 1875
- First run: August 1875
- Withdrawn: April 1929 (no. 32), June 1932 (no. 33)
- Scrapped: May 1929 (no. 32), 1934 (no. 33)

The two locomotives comprising the South Australian Railways J class were the only steam locomotives with a 0-6-0 wheel arrangement ever operated by the railway. They went into service in August 1875 and were condemned more than five decades later, in 1929 and 1932.

== Irish origins ==
Both of the locomotives were built in 1872 by Beyer, Peacock & Co. Ltd at their Gorton Foundry near Manchester for the Irish companies Dublin and Belfast Junction Railway and Dublin and Drogheda Railway, which were cutting back on purchases. There were few other 1600 millimetres (5 feet 3 inches) broad-gauge railways in existence at the time, and they were offered for sale to the South Australian Government.

== Deployment ==
The locomotives were about 25 per cent more powerful than any on the South Australian Railways at the time, so they were put to immediate use hauling copper trains and wheat trains on the Port Adelaide to Kapunda route. (Note: South Australia's first large-scale copper mine was at Kapunda; it opened in 1844 and closed in 1879.) Early on, they were also well deployed hauling heavy goods trains over the fairly level Adelaide–Port Adelaide route. The six-wheel rigid wheelbase, with no leading or trailing truck to minimise yawing, did not make the locomotives suitable for the tightly curved and steeply graded line through the Adelaide hills, even though their large (5 ft 0 1/2 in) diameter wheels were characteristic of passenger locomotives of the time.

What made the J class more powerful than its contemporary?
Robert Stephenson, the engineer who led England's choice of 1435 mm (4 ft 8 1/2 in) as its "standard" gauge, did not make full use of the extra 6 1/2 inches between the frames that the broad gauge allowed. The J class, ordered originally for the Irish broad gauge, took advantage of this factor with cylinders of 17 inches diameter – but the contemporaneous South Australian Railways H class built by Stephenson had a cylinder diameter of only 14 inches. Further, the H class's smokebox did not extend outside the frames and the boiler was even smaller in diameter. By also increasing both the cylinder and valve chest size, and by using a larger boiler, the J was 50% more powerful than the H class.

When copper ore traffic came to an end, the two locomotives were deployed on the main northern line to Terowie which, by then, had opened to Terowie, the break-of-gauge station on the southern boundary of the narrow-gauge Northern Division. (Note: 33.1505°S 138.9212°E)

By 1888, both locomotives were relegated to shunting duties because they were in dire need of major overhauls, which followed two years later.

When the Murraylands lines opened early in the 1900s, one J class locomotive was stationed at Murray Bridge, from where it operated on the new lines. Although these lightly engineered lines had undulating gradients through sandy mallee country, most curves were broad, allowing the 0-6-0s to traverse them quite easily.

The two locomotives' last long-distance duties were working cattle trains over the Terowie line, after which they were relegated to shunting duties around Adelaide. Following the introduction of Commissioner William Webb's "big power" locomotives, they were taken out of service and condemned in 1929 and 1932, as were many of their ancient contemporaries. They were scrapped respectively in 1929 and 1934.

== Modifications ==
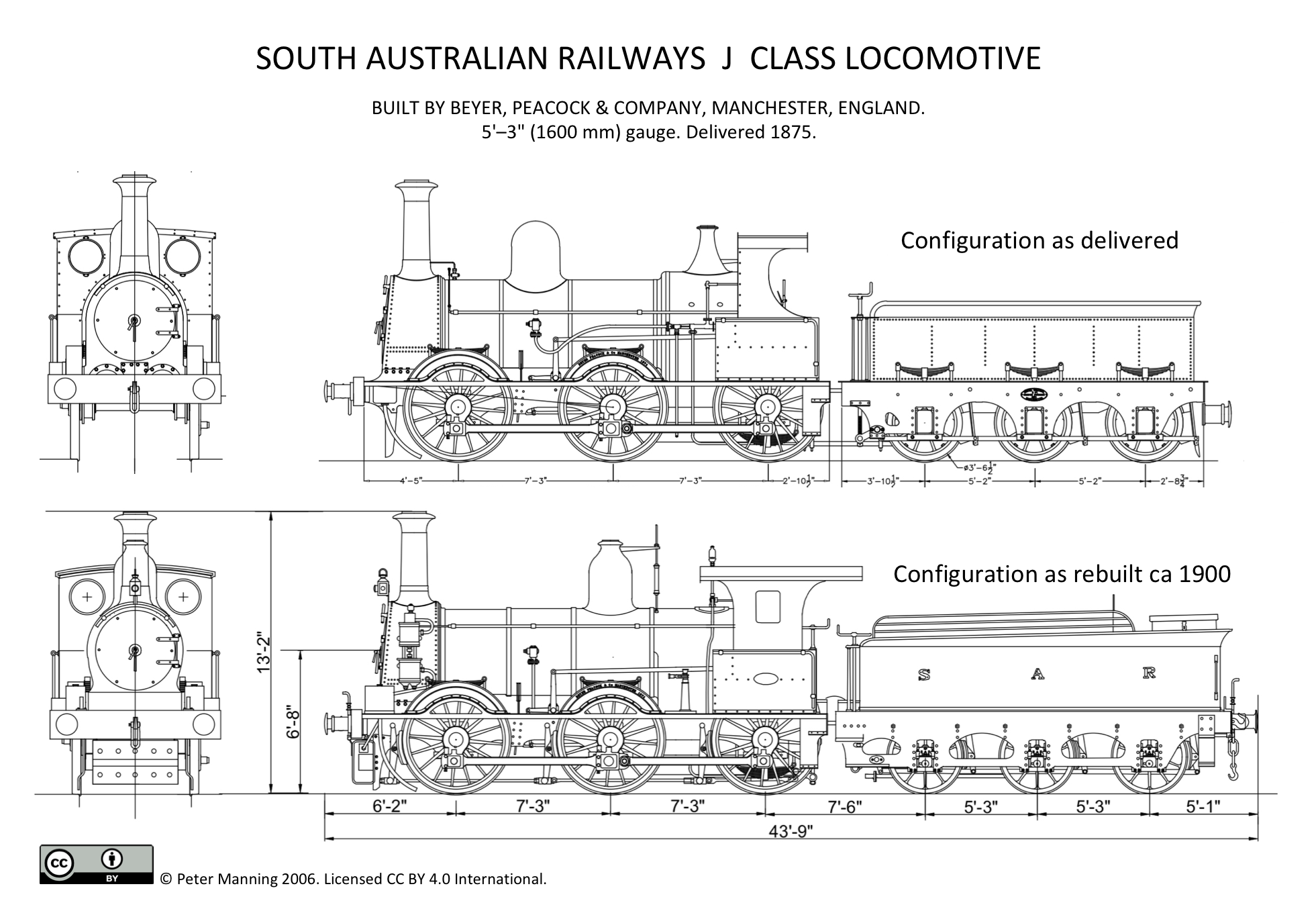
The J class in as-delivered configuration in 1875 and after final rebuild about 1900

As introduced, the locomotives were typical Beyer, Peacock products, with features that included highly polished brass steam domes. Large cutaways on the sides of the cab, and a roof that covered only a small area, provided little protection for the crew. A small oil or kerosene lamp was placed on the front top of the smokebox; electric headlights were never fitted. Later, marker lamps were placed on the front running board to identify the destination at night.

One of the first alterations was the addition of a bar-frame "cowcatcher", which remained until the locomotives were assigned to shunting in the metropolitan area: since they protruded well past the front buffers, they were particularly dangerous for railwaymen coupling the locomotive to wagons.

The locomotives' first significant rebuild was undertaken in 1890 and 1891. The cabs were slightly altered, extending the roof a little to provide more shelter to the crew; boilers and safety valves were also replaced. About ten years later, their vacuum brakes were replaced by Westinghouse air brakes and better cabs, similar to those of the F, S and T classes, were installed. The new cab sides were solid, with small rectangular window openings, providing more protection than the large cutaways. New roofs, extending back nearly to the tender, at last provided adequate protection from rain and the harsh South Australian summer sun, especially for the fireman when shovelling coal from tender to firebox.

By the time of their withdrawal in 1929 and 1932 after 57 and 60 years' service respectively, locomotives number 32 and 33 – like all of the Beyer, Peacock locomotives of the South Australian Railways – had well and truly paid for themselves.
