= Aitch =

Aitch may refer to:

- Aitch, a phonetic representation of the letter H
- Aitch (rapper) (born 1999), British rapper
- Aitch (surname)
- Aitch, Pennsylvania, an extinct town in Huntingdon County
- Aitch bone, the rump bone in cattle; see Rump steak
- A common name for the enigmatic fossil Etacystis

== See also ==
- Aich (surname)
- Aitch-dropping, in phonetics
- H (disambiguation)
- Haitch
