= SCOA-P wheel =

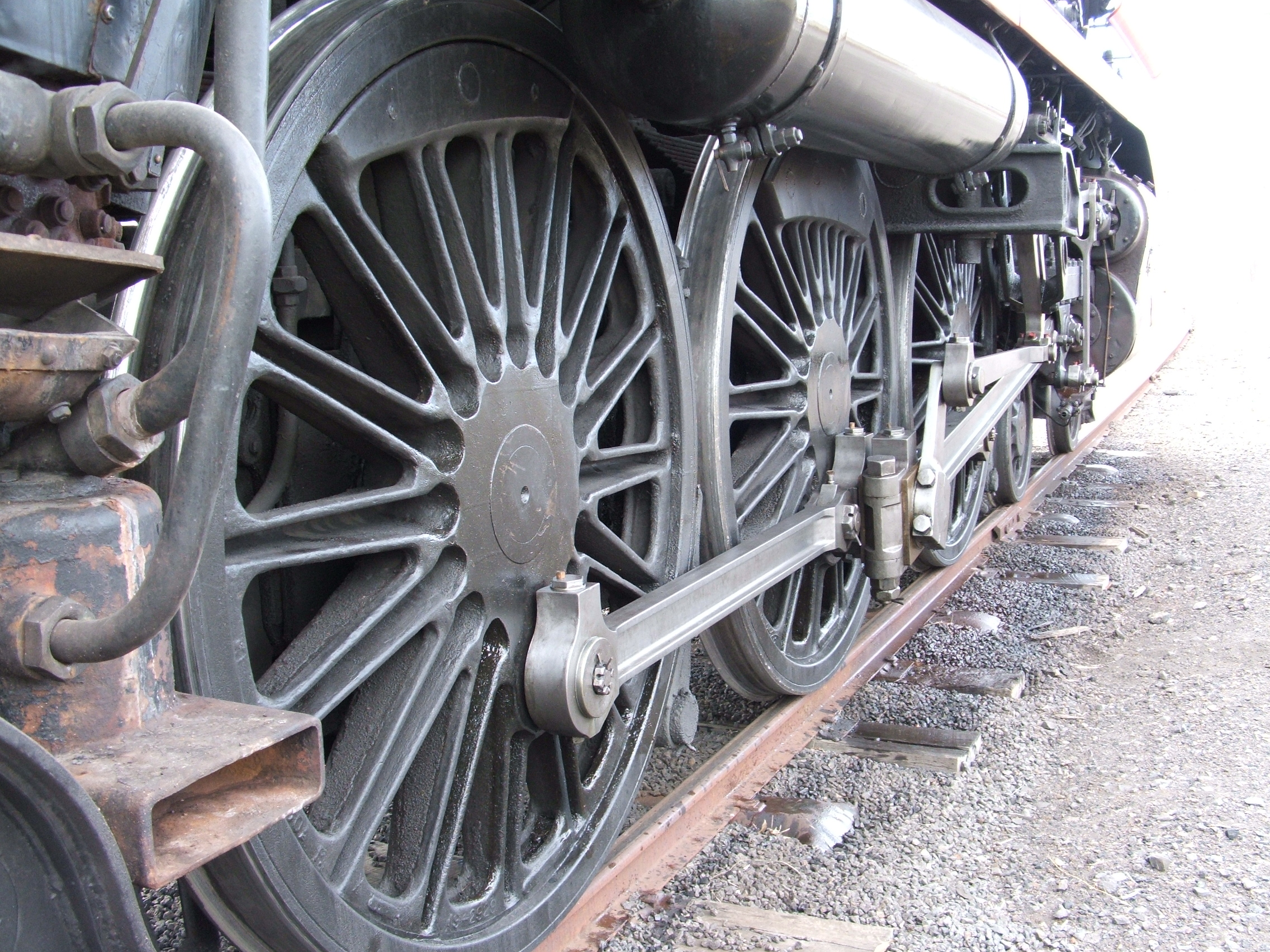
SCOA-P driving wheels

SCOA-P pattern wheels are a type of steam locomotive wheel. Rather than having traditional solid spokes, the SCOA-P spoke is hollow, with a U-shaped cross section. They are considerably lighter than a conventional spoked wheel or Boxpok wheel of the same size and strength.

== History ==
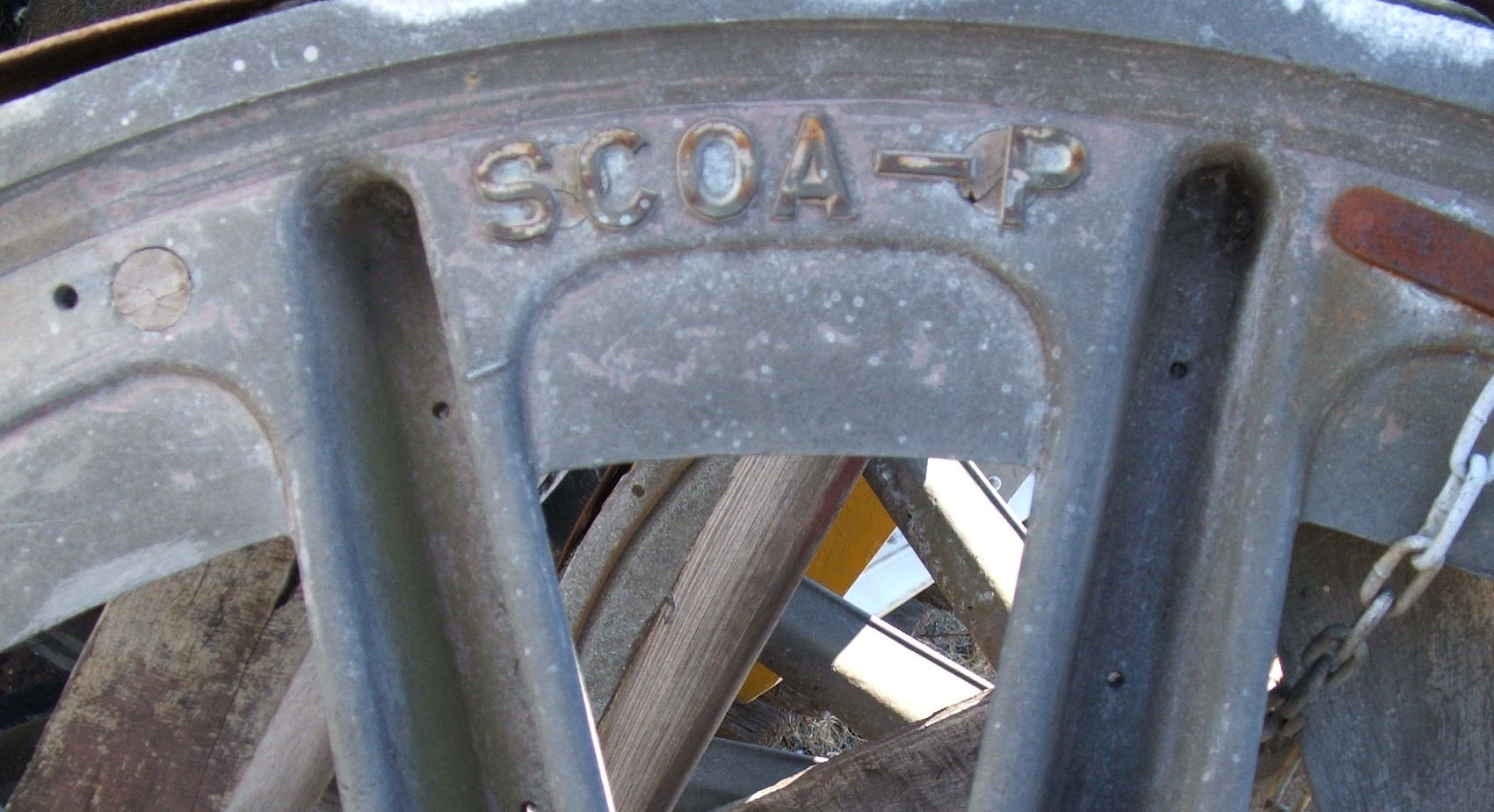
SCOA-P wheel centre detail (tyre removed)

SCOA-P wheels were developed in the late 1940s by the Steel Company of Australia Ltd (the P in the acronym standing for F. C. Paynter, who patented the design) in response to Victorian Railways experiencing fatigue problems with conventional spoked wheels. Stronger Boxpok type 'B' wheels had been installed on a number of VR locomotive classes in the late 1940s, but they had the disadvantage of being relatively heavy and also restricted maintenance access to axleboxes, underslung springs, and in some cases boiler washout plugs. Boxpok wheels were proposed for the forthcoming Victorian Railways R class 4-6-4, which had a relatively heavy 19.5-long-ton (19.8 t) axle load, but it had been discovered that the use of a Boxpok wheel would make coupling rod pin removal difficult. The SCOA-P wheel was developed to allow the strength of the Boxpok design but also provide the maintenance access of a conventional spoked wheel.

== Comparative performance ==
The SCOA-P wheel centre of a 73 in (1,854 mm) R class driving wheel weighed only 1,829 pounds (830 kg), 322 lb (146 kg) lighter than a Boxpok design of the same diameter and equivalent strength. Using a 100-long-ton (101.6 t) vertical press, load testing was conducted of the strength and elasticity of the SCOA-P wheel centre against a 2,021 lb (917 kg) conventional spoked driving wheel centre of an A2 class locomotive that had the same diameter, but was engineered for a lower 17.5-long-ton (17.8 t) axle load). The tests revealed that the SCOA-P wheel was still elastic at 23.4 long tons (23.8 t), with a permanent set occurring at about 30 long tons (30.5 t), whereas the conventional spoked wheel experienced permanent set at 20 long tons (20.3 t).

== Use ==
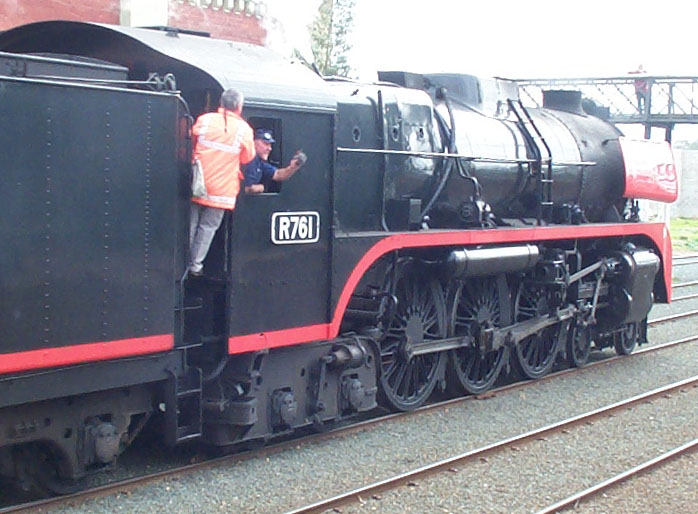
SCOA-P driving wheels on Victorian Railways R class 4-6-4 steam locomotive R 761.

SCOA-P wheels were used on Victorian Railways' R class 4-6-4 and J class 2-8-0 locomotives, introduced in 1951 and 1954 respectively. They were also used on the Queensland Railways BB18¼ class 4-6-2 and Tasmanian Government Railways M class 4-6-2, H class 4-8-2 and Tasmanian Government Railways X class (1950) BO-BO Diesel Electric

Because the Vulcan Foundry, which built the VR J class, built SCOA-P wheeled locomotives for export until ceasing steam locomotive production in 1956, this wheel type was also seen in many of Vulcan's other export markets.

SCOA-P wheel centres were found on locomotives for the Gold Coast Railway in Africa (WM and YL classes), East African Railways (30 and 31 classes), Iran Railways' 2-10-2 Decapod, and a class of Indian Government Railways' 2-8-4T tank locomotives, among others.

== See also ==
- Boxpok wheel
