= Victorian Railways R class =

Class of Australian 4-6-4 steam locomotives

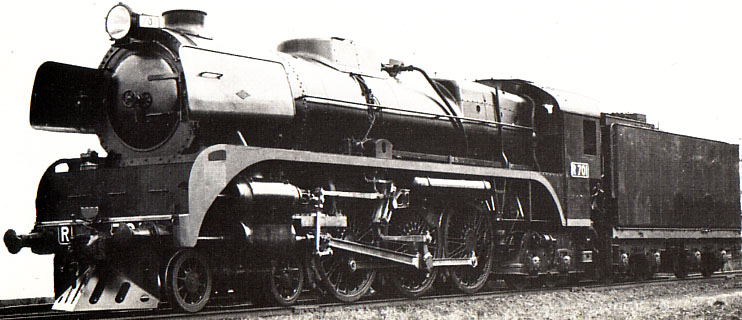
- Victorian Railways publicity photograph of R 701, 1951
Type and origin
- Power type: Steam
- Builder: North British Locomotive Company, Glasgow
Specifications
- Configuration
  - Whyte: 4-6-4
- Gauge: 5 ft 3 in (1,600 mm); 1,435 mm (4 ft 8 1/2 in) (R 766)
- Driver dia.: 73 in (1,854 mm)
- Length: 77 ft 3 1/4 in (23.55 m)
- Axle load: 19 long tons 10 cwt (43,700 lb or 19.8 t)
- Adhesive weight: 50 long tons 10 cwt (113,100 lb or 51.3 t)
- Loco weight: 107 long tons 12 cwt (241,000 lb or 109.3 t)
- Tender weight: 79 long tons 16 cwt (178,800 lb or 81.1 t)
- Total weight: 187 long tons 8 cwt (419,800 lb or 190.4 t)
- Tender cap.: 6 long tons 0 cwt (13,400 lb or 6.1 t) coal 9,000 imp gal (40,915 L; 10,809 US gal) water
- Firebox
  - Grate area: 42 ft^{2} (3.9 m^{2})
- Boiler pressure: 210 psi (1.45 MPa)
- Heating surface: 2,705 ft^{2} (251.3 m^{2})
- Cylinders: 2
- Cylinder size: 21.5 in × 28 in (546 mm × 711 mm)
Performance figures
- Power output: 1,840 hp (1,372 kW) at 37.5 mph (60.4 km/h)
- Tractive effort: 32,080 lbf (142.7 kN) at 85% boiler pressure
Career
- Number in class: 70
- Preserved: 7

The R class is a 4-6-4 Hudson express passenger steam locomotive that ran on Australia's Victorian Railways (VR) from 1951 to 1974. A much-needed replacement for the 1907-era A2 class 4-6-0, their development and construction was repeatedly delayed due to financial constraints caused by the Great Depression and later the manpower and materials shortages of World War II and the immediate postwar period.

Orders eventually totalling 70 locomotives were placed with the North British Locomotive Company of Glasgow. Once initial teething problems were overcome, R class locomotives proved to be a success and their power and speed enabled faster timetabled services. However, they were almost immediately superseded by mainline diesel-electric and electric locomotives on the Victorian Railways from 1952 onwards. With successive orders of diesel-electric locomotives through the 1950s and 1960s gradually displacing them, all but seven of the class were withdrawn and scrapped.

Four of the remaining locomotives were later restored to operating condition between 1984 and 1998. These have seen use ranging from hauling special heritage train services through to substituting for modern diesel-electric locomotives on regular intercity rail services run by V/Line and West Coast Railway. Another surviving example, number R 704, was originally displayed at the Festival of Britain in 1951 and is now on permanent display at the Newport Railway Museum in Newport, Victoria.

== History ==
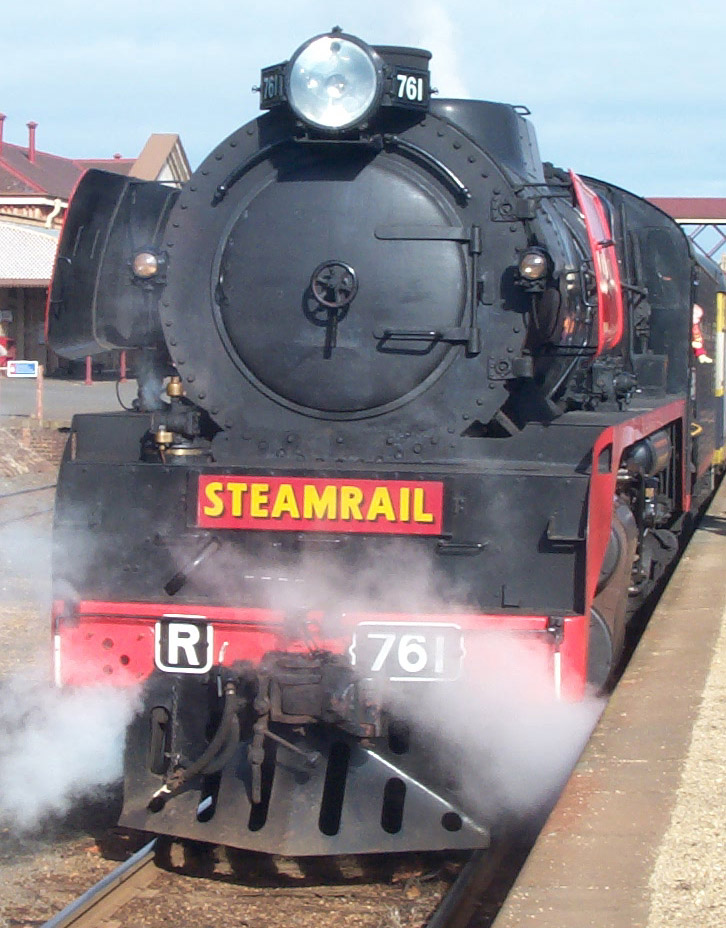
R761 at Bendigo Station in 2003

Within a few years of the introduction of the A2 class 4-6-0 in 1907, it was clear that increasingly heavy train loads would require a more powerful locomotive on principal main lines. From as early as 1918, a series of drawings for potential 4-6-2 'Pacific' type locomotives began to emerge from the VR's Locomotive Design Section, some of which were ultimately developed into the 3 cylinder S class heavy Pacific of 1928. However, plans for a smaller 2 cylinder Pacific, with an axle load below 20 tons to allow operation across the VR mainline network, were put on hold during the 1930s. This was partly due to the decline in traffic and revenue due to the Great Depression, and partly due to the improved power outputs and efficiency from the A2 locomotives after the application of a series of smokebox design and draughting changes referred to as 'Modified Front End' in the mid-1930s.

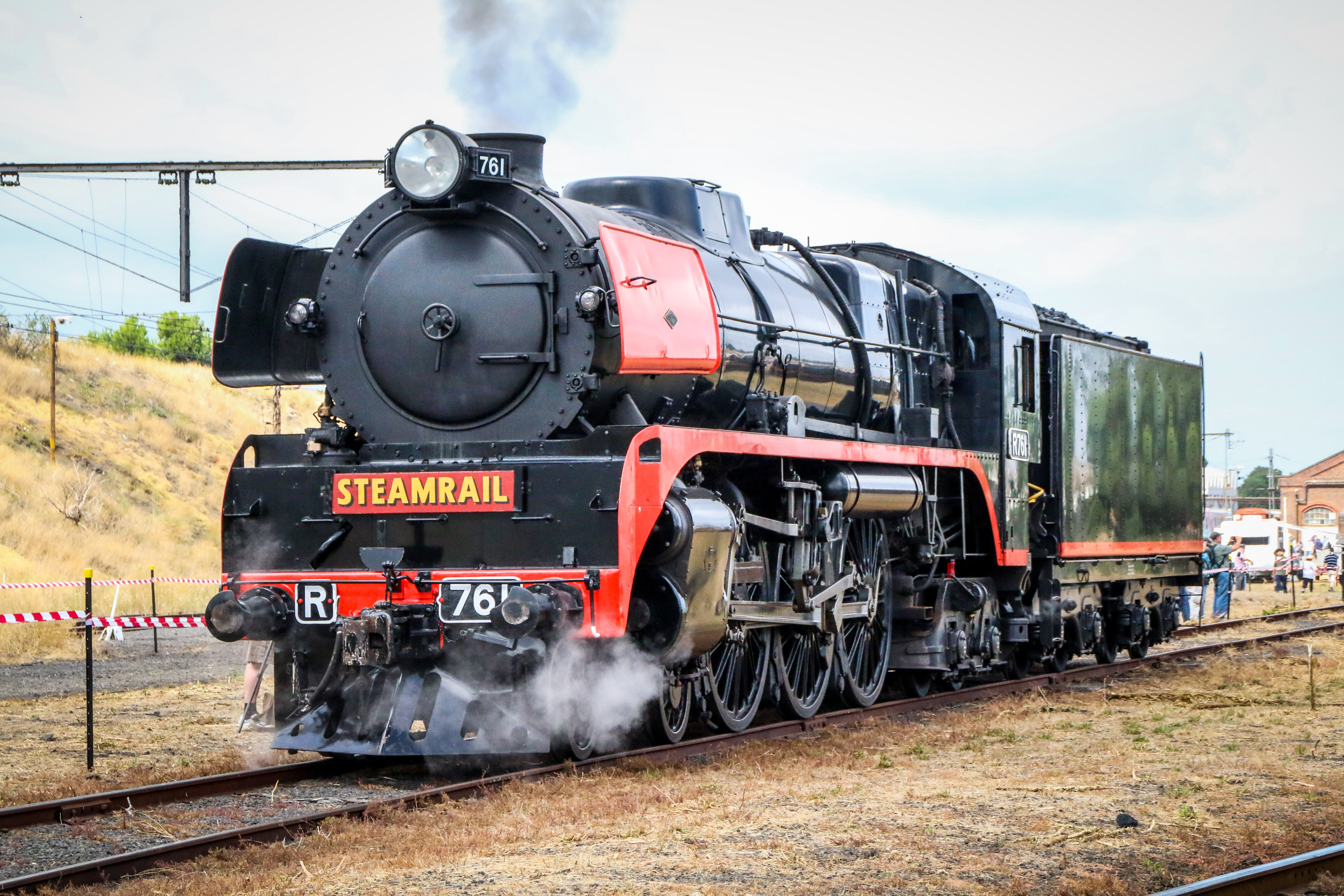
R761 at Newport Workshops in 2018

By 1943 however, the situation had changed. There was a massive increase in traffic brought by the advent of World War II, and the A2s were by this point well past their prime. The VR Locomotive Design Section once again turned their attention to the proposed Pacific replacement. The addition of a mechanical stoker, the enlarging of the grate from 37 to 42 square feet (3.4 to 3.9 m^{2}) for increased performance and the use of heavy bar-frame construction for increased durability significantly increased the projected weight of the locomotive. To keep the axle load to 19.5 tons, the design by 1944 had changed from a 4-6-2 'Pacific' to a 4-6-4 'Hudson' wheel arrangement.

=== Design features ===
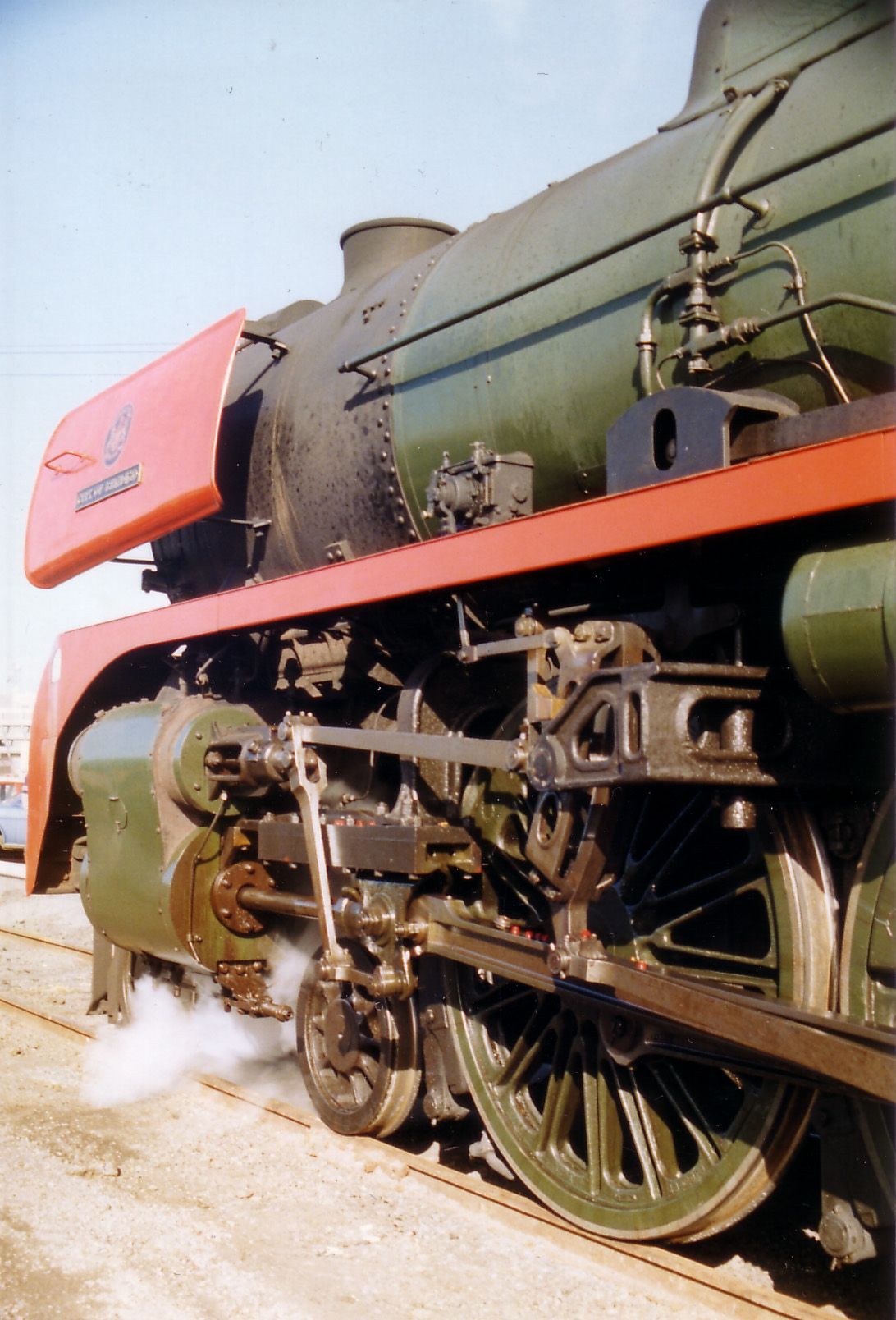
SCOA-P coupled wheels and Witte smoke deflectors, R 766, 1993

The R class reflected an ongoing evolution of VR locomotive design and a response to the changing operational environment of the VR in the postwar era.

The R class adopted the bar frame construction of the H and S class express passenger locomotives, which had proven to be far more robust in coping with the VR's varying track quality than the fracture-prone plate frames of the A2.

The decision to install MB Type 1 mechanical stoker equipment (capable of feeding up to 10,000 lb (4,536 kg) of coal per hour) on a locomotive with only a 42-square-foot (3.9 m^{2}) grate reflected improved postwar working conditions for locomotive firemen, the varying quality of postwar coal and the expectation of sustained high speed operation of the locomotive. The manually fired prewar VR S class Pacific, although capable of 2,300 drawbar horsepower (1,700 kW), was limited by the physical ability of the fireman to feed its 50-square-foot (4.6 m^{2}) grate and as such was reliant on coal with a high calorific value.

Online locomotive database steamlocomotive.com notes: "They showed an interesting blend of European, British, American, and Australian practice. The slotted pilot is Australian, the long sand dome American, the Belpaire firebox and cab British, and the mid-line smoke lifters ('elephant ears') European."

Other modern features included SKF roller bearings on all axles and the innovative, lightweight SCOA-P type driving wheels, which were specially developed for the R class by the Steel Company of Australia.

=== Production ===
An order for 20 locomotives was placed with the VR's Newport Workshops in 1946, but remained unfulfilled for years, because shortages of steel and manpower saw other projects given precedence, such as the overhaul of badly run-down infrastructure and the building of extra X class goods locomotives.

By the late 1940s, the A2 class was at the end of its life, and new motive power was desperately required. Australian Federal Government restrictions on the availability of US dollars, designed to favour trade within the British Empire, precluded the VR from purchasing American diesel-electric locomotives. The VR broke with a long-standing policy of in-house steam locomotive construction and called for tenders to construct an additional 50 R class. The contract was awarded to North British Locomotive Company of Glasgow, Scotland on 21 September 1949. On 12 January 1950, the order was increased to 70, with the cancellation of the original order of 20 of the locomotives from VR's Newport Workshops. Parts manufactured for the Newport order were used to complete the North British-built locomotives.

Further delays were experienced after the locomotives began arriving in May 1951. Corrosion had already set in during their sea voyage from Scotland to Australia as deck cargo, and there were numerous manufacturing defects requiring rectification. R 703 was the first of the class in service, on 27 June 1951, and the last of the fleet, R 769, did not enter service until 23 September 1953.

== Service life ==
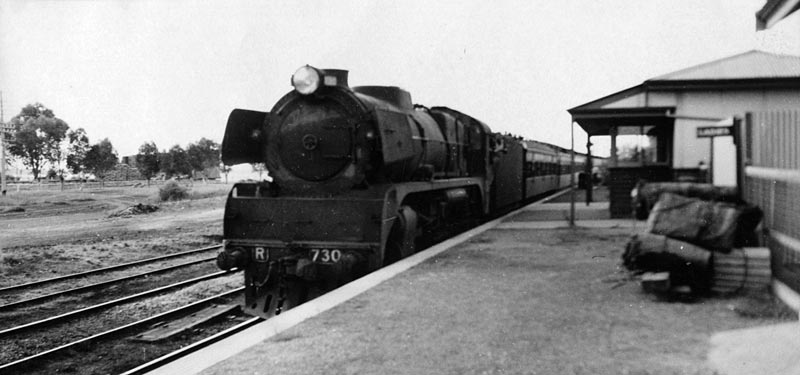
R 730, hauling a Melbourne-Dimboola passenger service, at Parwan station, 1953. This locomotive was the last of the class to be scrapped, on 13 October 1969.

Once the manufacturing defects and corrosion damage were corrected, the R class proved to be a fine locomotive in its intended role of express passenger service, and individual R class locomotives were soon running upwards of 950 to 1,250 miles (1,530 to 2,010 km) each per week. Dynamometer car testing showed they were capable of producing a maximum 1,840 drawbar horsepower (1,372 kW) at 37.5 mph (60.4 km/h), a significant improvement over the A2's 1,230 hp (920 kW) at 32 mph (51 km/h). They quickly took over virtually all mainline passenger services previously operated by the A2 and passenger timetables were revised to take advantage of their higher performance, with cuts to journey times as high as 60 minutes. Although of similar size to the X class 2-8-2 goods locomotive, the R's more modern design features such as larger volume smokebox and better valve events courtesy of larger 11-inch (280 mm) diameter piston valves with long 6-inch (150 mm) travel contributed to its significantly higher horsepower output than the 1,400 drawbar horsepower (1,044 kW) output of the X class.

Features such as the mechanical stoker, smooth riding characteristics and large, comfortable cab also made them popular with crews.

The R's impressive debut was cut short by the introduction of the B class diesel electric locomotives from July 1952. By the end of 1953, the success of the B class saw the R class withdrawn from The Overland service to Adelaide and also VR's passenger service to Mildura. The Gippsland line, which was electrified to Traralgon by 1955, was the first line to see the complete withdrawal of the R class from service. On 18 May 1964, R 703 worked the last regular steam-hauled passenger train out of Melbourne, the 6:05pm Geelong service.

The Rs were pressed into secondary passenger and goods service, roles for which a Hudson with large diameter driving wheels was sometimes a less than ideal choice. There was little opportunity to exploit their high speed capability. Furthermore, their relatively low factor of adhesion (4.08) and lack of fully compensated springing, coupled with the tendency of locomotives to transfer weight to the rearmost wheels under high drawbar pull conditions (which in the case of the R meant a weight transfer from the driving wheels to the unpowered trailing truck) caused them to slip when starting heavy goods trains.

The R class is remembered by many for its role as power for the seasonal grain harvest. In times of a good harvest, virtually every available locomotive would be marshalled into service to shift wheat trains of over 1,000 tons from Victoria's Western district through to the ports for export. Double-headed R class locomotives, sometimes aided by a third R acting as banking engine at the rear, could be seen battling the 3 mile, 1 in 52 (1.92%) Warrenheip Bank out of Ballarat.

In the 1960s, as the railway preservation movement began to gather momentum, a small number of R class locomotives found a new role as power for excursion train services. In this role they were able to fulfill their intended role of high speed passenger travel, with speeds of over 80 mph (129 km/h) being recorded.

== Modifications ==
=== Alternate fuels ===
==== Pulverised Brown Coal ====
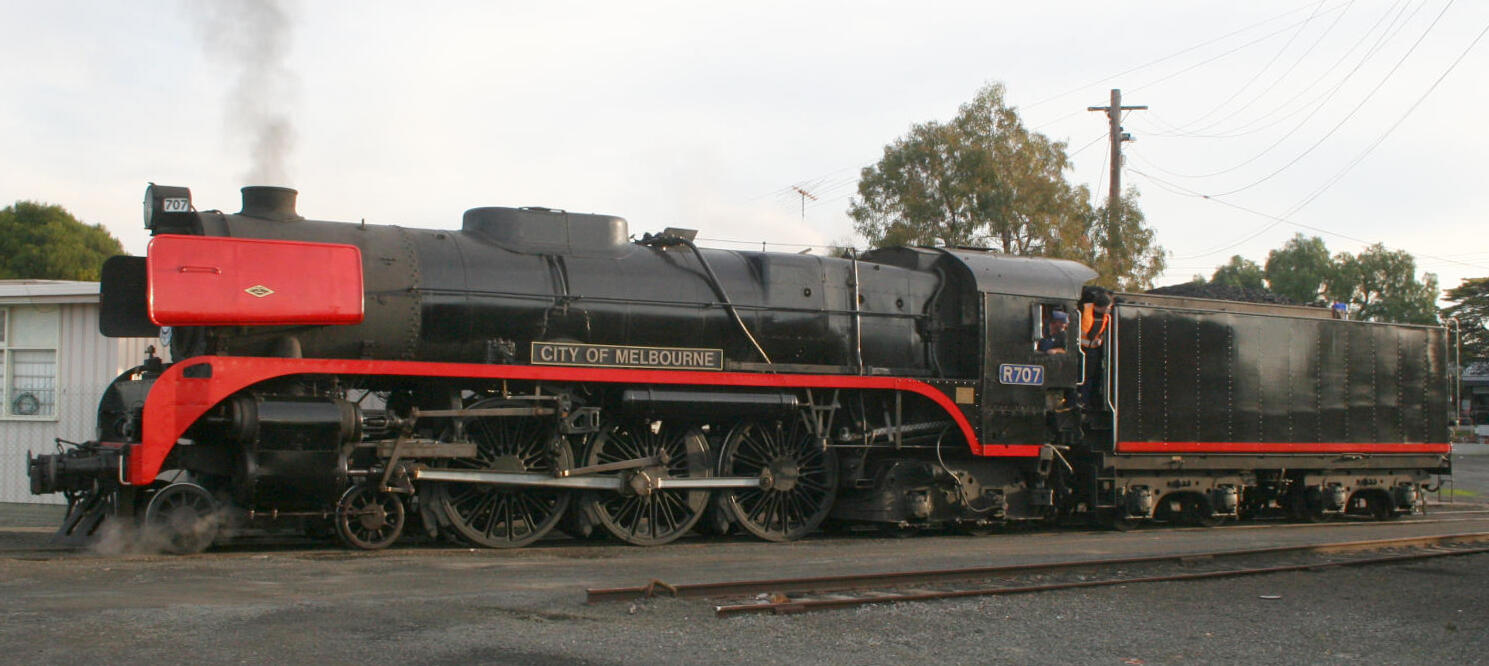
Preserved locomotive R 707 at the Geelong locomotive depot in 2007

R 707, which due to various defects had still not been put into service by 1954, was selected for modification for precipitated brown coal (PBC) operation in conjunction with trials of this fuel being undertaken with X class 'Mikado' X 32. Dynamometer car tests with R 707 showed the locomotive was able to develop approximately 1,590 drawbar horsepower (1,186 kW) at 37.5 mph (60.4 km/h), roughly equivalent to the 1,605 drawbar horsepower (1,197 kW) generated by a conventional R class locomotive burning second grade Lithgow black coal. However, comparative tests also demonstrated that R 707 also achieved considerably higher efficiency, capable of consuming 1.5 tons less coal on the 200-mile (320 km) Melbourne to Bendigo round trip hauling a 350-ton trailing load, despite the lower calorific value of brown coal than the Lithgow coal. While the PBC locomotives performed well, the expense of installing storage and handling facilities became increasingly uneconomic with falling prices for fuel oil and the success of diesel-electric traction. The conversion had also reduced the water capacity of R 707's tender such that there was insufficient margin for delays or bad weather running on many routes, confining the locomotive to the shorter Melbourne to Geelong and Seymour lines. The experiments were discontinued and R 707 was converted back to black coal operation in 1957.

==== Oil firing ====
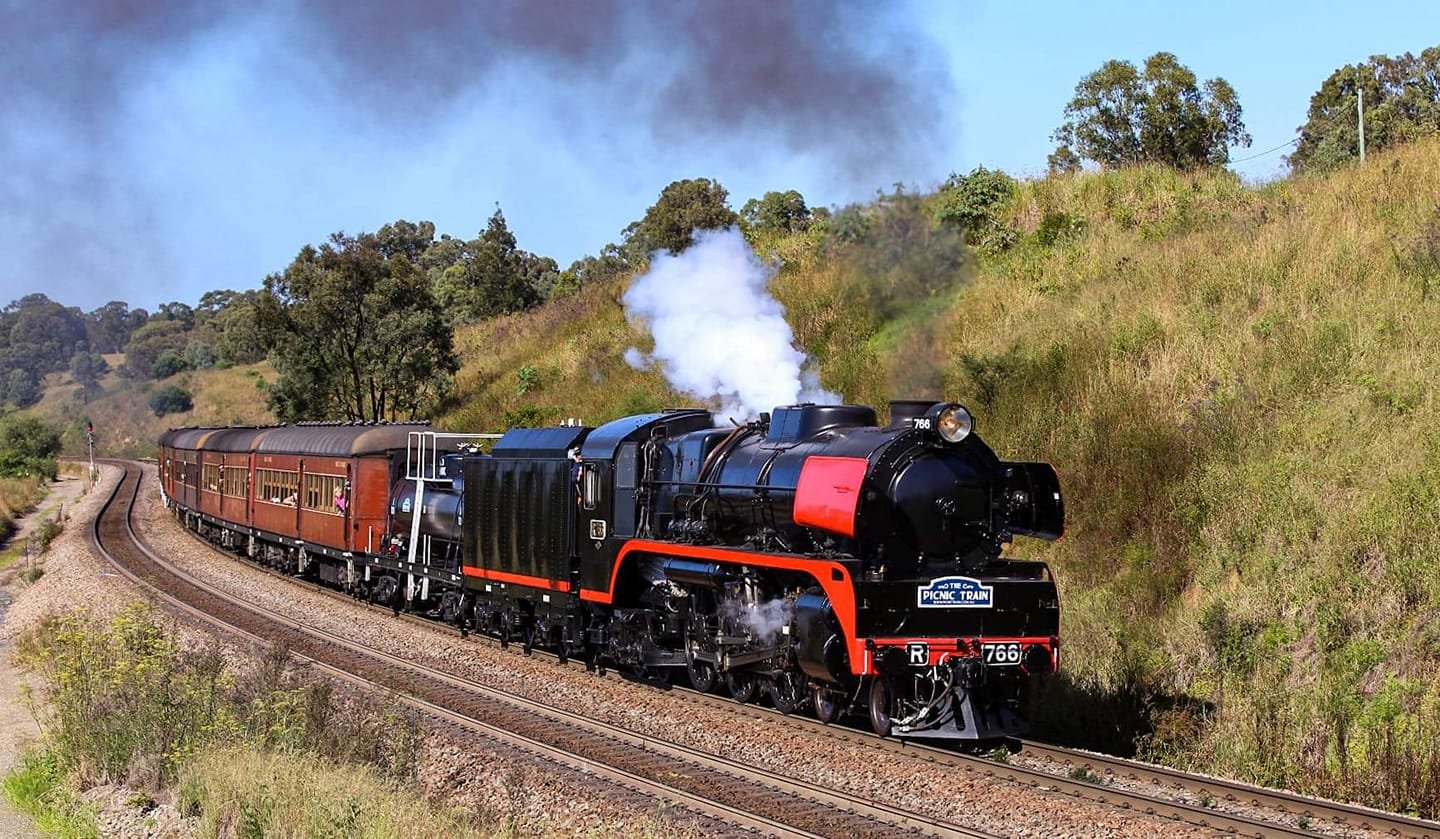
R766 Hauling The Picnic Train.

R 719 and 748 were converted to oil-firing during the mid-1950s using oil tanks and burner equipment salvaged from the four scrapped S class steam locomotives. They performed very well and were favourites among crews for their clean, cinder-free running. The reduced maintenance associated with their oil-fired operation meant they also had the highest availability of any of the R class and as such recorded the highest mileages of any of the class. However, rising fuel oil costs and the ongoing dieselisation program on the VR precluded any further locomotives from being converted. R 743 was in the process of conversion to oil firing as part of a major overhaul in February 1957 when instructions were issued to halt the conversion program and was returned to service as a coal fired locomotive.

=== Big-end oil cap ===
As of late 1961, three Bendigo-based engines still working passenger services between Bendigo and Swan Hill - R709, R727 and R752 - had the wooden plugs in their big-end lubrication caps removed and replaced with a steel plug, thus requiring crews to remove the whole cap to confirm sufficient oil was present in that part of the mechanism. This change was made due to recurring failures caused by a lack of oil, and the change prevented that; each of the three engines were recorded working over three thousand miles per month.

== Demise ==
Because they were superseded so early in their lives by more modern forms of traction, and because they spent so much of their remaining lives stored for seasonal grain traffic and/or in poor condition, the R class achieved one of the lowest average mileages of any VR locomotive. The lowest was that of R 716, which recorded just 88,909 miles (143,085 km) in just four years of service before being withdrawn in 1956 and scrapped in 1962.

As the VR focussed its attention on diesel electric traction, steam locomotive depots were gradually closed down and the remaining steam fleet became a much lower maintenance priority. A particular problem was the lack of feedwater treatment, which saw many R class locomotive boilers condemned for severe corrosion well before the end of their design life.

The final year of the R class in general service was 1967 with the withdrawal of the final three operating in this capacity: R 742 on 23 June, R 735 on 24 July and oil-burning R 748 on 10 August 1967. After this date, the remaining R class locomotives on the register were used for special enthusiast workings. R 706, R 769 and R 749 continued in this role until boiler and mechanical conditions made them too costly to maintain and they too were withdrawn, leaving only R 707 and R 761 in operable condition.

Scrappings had commenced with R 755 in 1960, which had been involved in a serious rear-end collision with a freight train earlier that year, and continued through the decade. By 1970, only seven of the class remained intact. R 707 and R 761 continued to haul various special trains until both were withdrawn in 1974 as their boiler certificates expired, and with their withdrawal came the end of over a century of mainline steam locomotive operation on Victorian Railways.

== 21st century steam: West Coast Railway's R 711 and R 766 ==
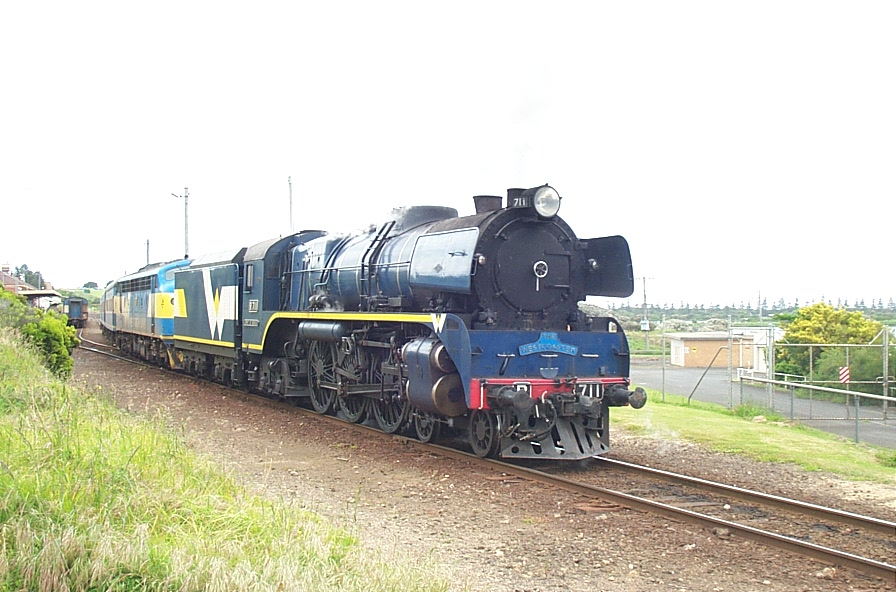
R 711, equipped with dual Lempor exhausts, resting at Warrnambool after hauling a West Coast Railway passenger service, 2001.

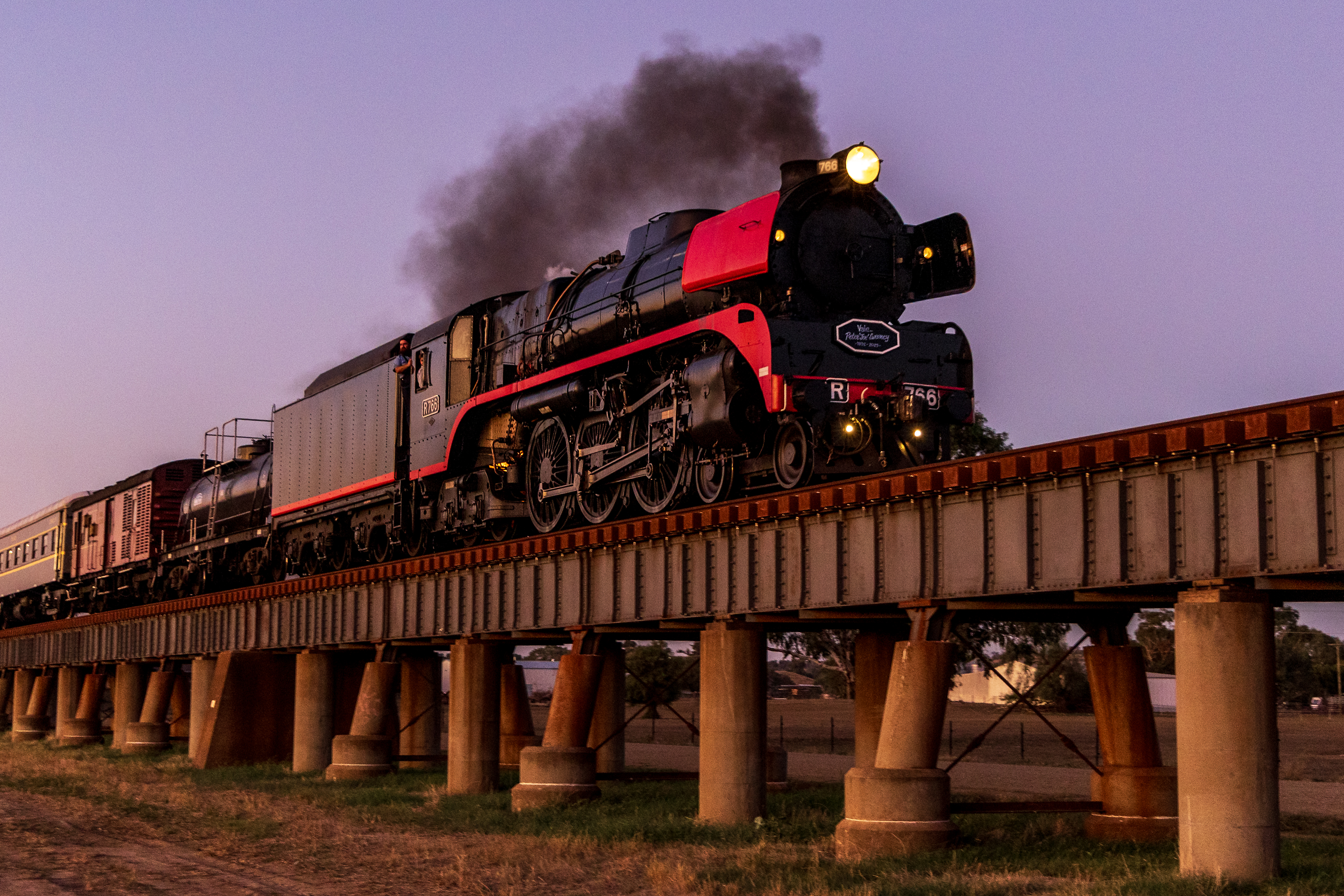
R 766 at Wagga Wagga in April 2025.

R class locomotives saw a relatively brief but notable return to operation of regularly scheduled mainline passenger rail services when in the late 1990s, two of the remaining locomotives were extensively modified and returned to service. Private rail operator West Coast Railway, which had successfully tendered for operation of the Warrnambool railway line in the privatisation of the Victorian passenger rail network, modified the locomotives as part of an ambitious plan to operate steam-powered express passenger services running to the same timetable as those operated by modern diesel electric locomotives.

In order to ensure the locomotive's ability to reliably keep to the timetable, a number of notable design changes were made. These included the replacement of the original single blastpipe with dual Lempor ejectors, conversion to oil firing, fitting of power reverse, and the addition of a diesel control stand to allow for multiple unit operation with diesel electric locomotives where required. R 711 entered service on regular trains on 21 November 1998, and design refinements based on its performance in service were made to the subsequent conversion, with the exception of a diesel control stand, for R 766. For a number of years, the modified R class locomotives could be seen in regular operation between Melbourne and Warrnambool, keeping a fast 3 hour 13 minute schedule which included six stops along the 267 km (166 mi) route. In 2001, locomotive R 766 suffered a mechanical failure of its connecting rod assembly while running at 115 kilometres per hour (71 mph). The connecting rod became detached at one end and dug into the trackbed, although the locomotive was not derailed.

In 2004, West Coast Railway ceased operations after a number of operational problems made the business unviable. The two R class locomotives made a final trip back to Newport Workshops, where they passed into the care of Steamrail Victoria.

== Preservation ==
Victorian Railways R class steam locomotive R704 on exhibition at the Festival of Britain in 1951.

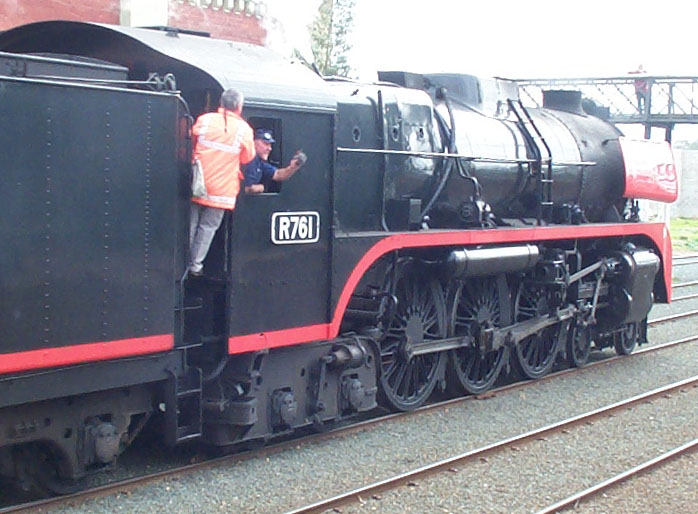
Preserved R 761 on a Steamrail Victoria tour at Echuca, 2003. This locomotive is finished in the standard black and red livery applied to all R class locomotives in VR service.

Seven R class locomotives have survived into preservation.

=== Static display ===
R 704, which was displayed at the 1951 Festival of Britain Exhibition of Industrial Power at Kelvin Hall in Glasgow, was prepared by North British Locomotive Company with a special exhibition finish rather than major structural alterations, featuring a one-off livery of spotless black and red paintwork with gold lining, 10 stainless steel boiler bands, chrome number plates, chrome cylinder covers, and highly polished metal fittings including the valve gear, as well as a Stones electric headlight in place of the standard Victorian Railways Pyle National type during the four month display. Although R 704 reverted to the standard VR R class livery upon entering service, it retained its commemorative plaques and stainless steel trim, and is today preserved and displayed in this state at the Newport Railway Museum.

=== Operational, stored or under restoration ===
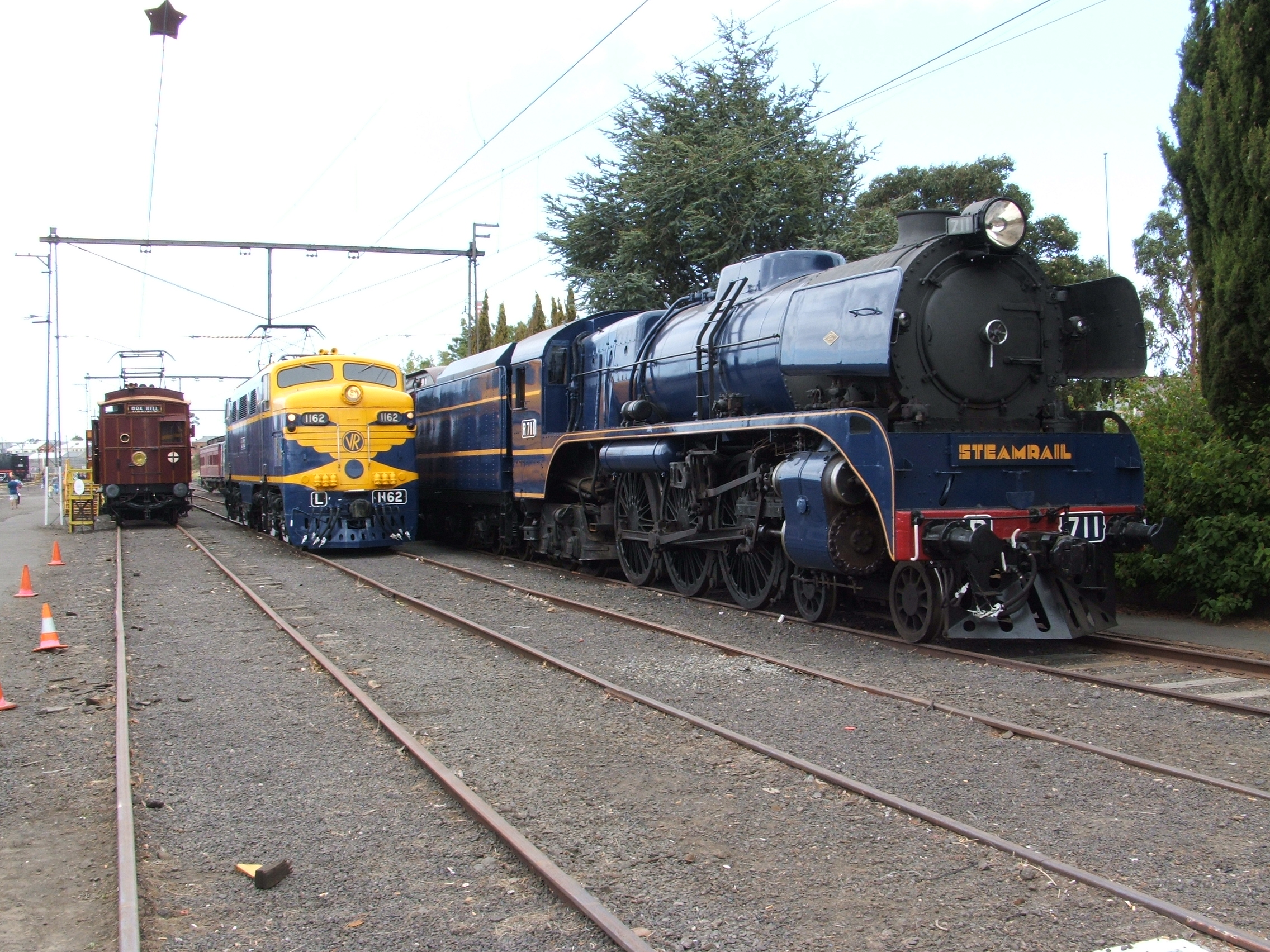
Preserved R 711 at Newport Workshops Garden platform, 12 March 2007

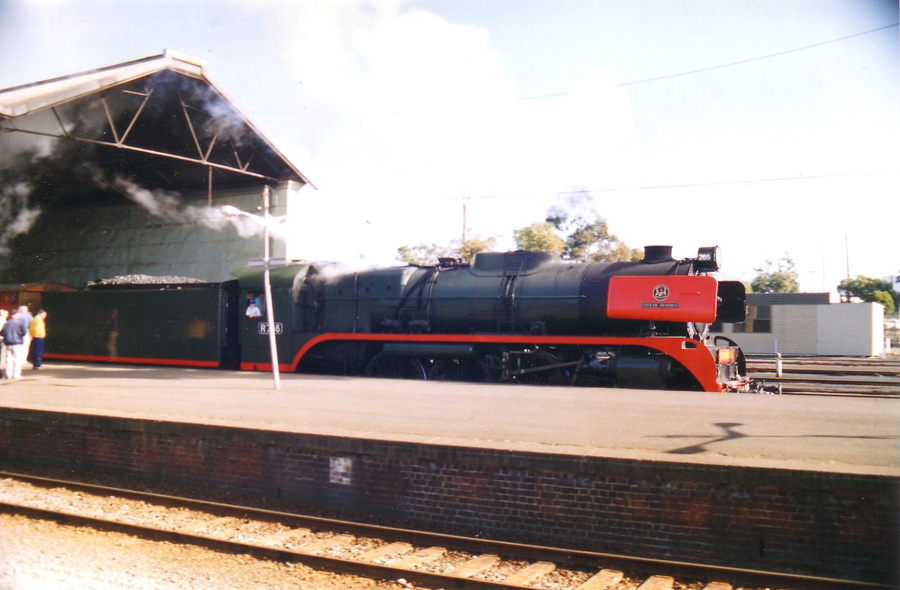
R 766 hauls a regular V/Line service from Geelong railway station, 1993.

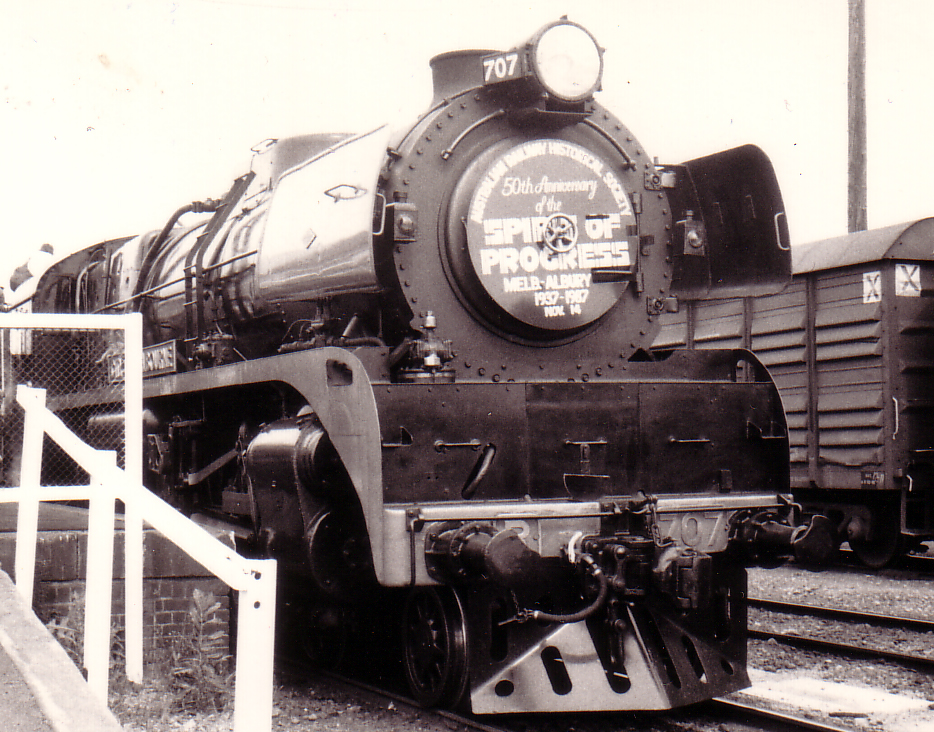
R707 at Benalla station to Albury in 1987

Preserved R class locomotives hauling a goods train at Newport Workshops

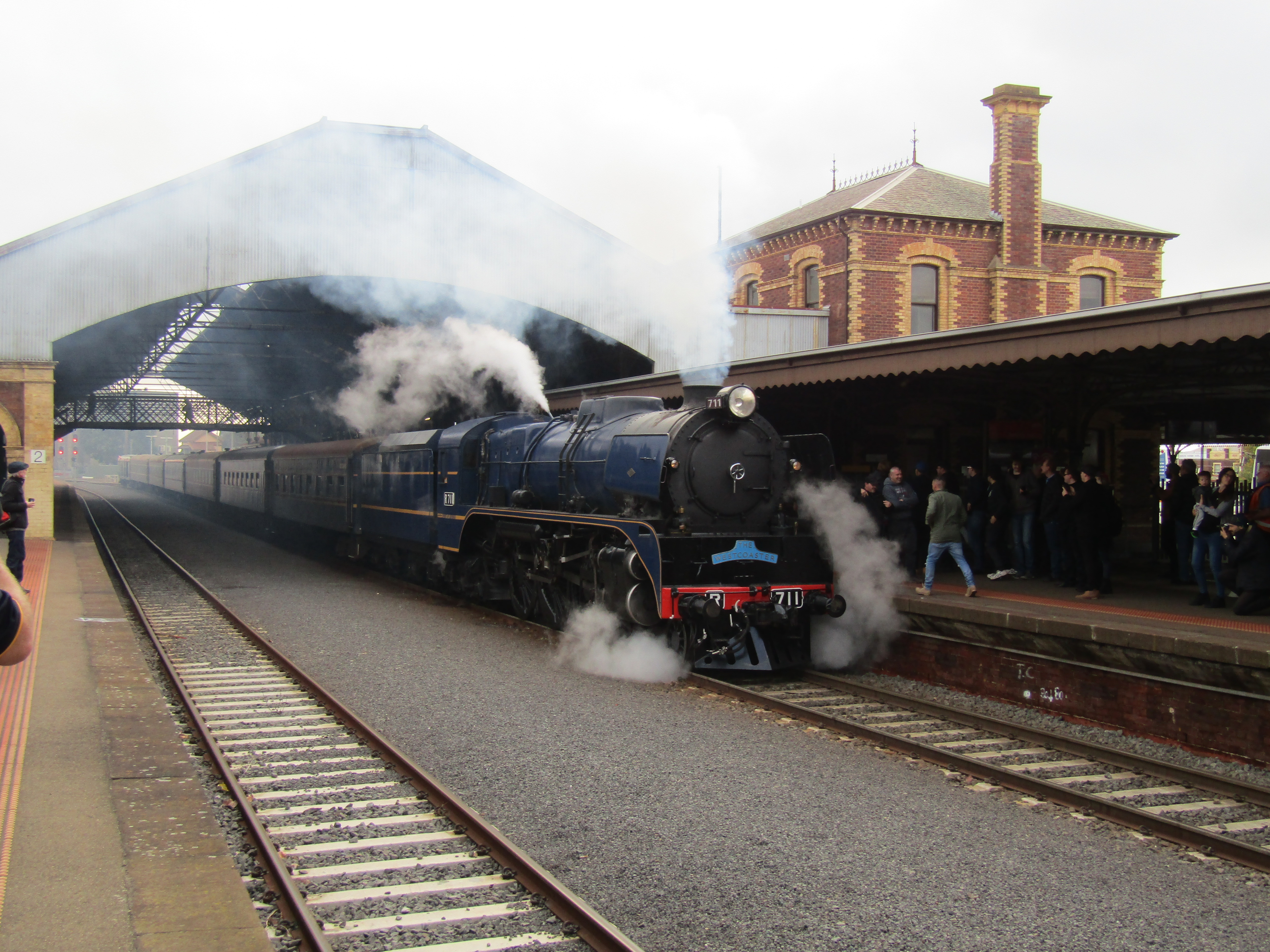
R711 at Geelong station on a tour to Warrnambool

R761, operated by Steamrail Victoria, and R707, operated by 707 Operations Incorporated, are both operational. Since restoration in the mid-1980s, both locomotives have hauled many special passenger trains for enthusiasts to various destinations on Victoria's remaining 5 ft 3 in (1,600 mm) network. Prior to the privatisation of V/Line in the 1990s, it was not uncommon to see R 707, 761 or 766 hauling normal revenue-earning V/Line passenger trains as a crew training exercise. R 707 has been named "City of Melbourne" in preservation.

After a lengthy absence, R711 is now operational and accredited to operate on the mainline. Now wearing a special Victorian Railways royal blue and gold livery reminiscent of the Spirit of Progress days. R711 returned to the mainline in the later half of 2011 conducting mainline trials. Whilst remaining oil fired, the engine has reverted to a single blast pipe set up as standard on the R class fleet as well as reverting to standard screw reverser. R711 is owned by the City of Bendigo. On 22 July 2012, R711 operated its first mainline tour open to the public, double heading with R761 to Traralgon as trailing engine, as part of the annual Snow Train.

R700 is stored pending restoration. R700 was stored in a dismantled state at Ballarat East until early 2011 when it was lifted back onto its wheels. In May 2012 the loco was transferred to Newport Workshops during an empty cars move, hauled by K190. The Smokebox end of the Locomotive was cosmetically restored for the Steamrail 2020 Open Weekend which included painting of running board, Tender and Steam Deflectors. It has since returned to storage.

R766 has passed through a number of operators and owners in preservation. It was acquired by a company trading as "Australian Vintage Travel" in 1981 and restored to operating condition for hauling luxury rail services. It was painted in a Brunswick green livery, matching the ex-South Australian Railways carriages also restored for these services. After Australian Vintage Travel folded in 1986, R 766 was acquired by a syndicate of shareholders ("766 Syndicate") and leased to Steamrail Victoria. In 1994, Steamrail volunteers re-painted R 766 in a maroon livery based on that of the London Midland and Scottish Railway, before the locomotive was leased to West Coast Railway (and repainted in the WCR corporate livery) in 2000. Like several other classes, the R-class was designed for ease of conversion to 4 ft 8 1/2 in (1,435 mm) standard gauge. Following its withdrawal from West Coast Railway service, R 766 was converted from 5 ft 3 in (1,600 mm) to 4 ft 8 1/2 in (1,435 mm) standard gauge by the Hunter Valley Railway Trust and was transferred to North Rothbury, New South Wales in December 2007.

The work was completed in 2018, an ICE radio was fitted in 2019 and limited line trials commenced in 2020, a mainline trial was also undertaken in late 2021, and commenced running tours with The Picnic Train across New South Wales in March 2022.

In 2026, R766 became the first Victorian steam locomotive to operate over the Sydney suburban rail network and into Sydney Central station. Following its certification for operation on the Sydney Trains network, R766 was marked with an official launch ceremony at Sydney Central on 28 August 2026, before making its first public departure from Sydney Central on 29 August 2026 and running subsequent tours across the metropolitan network including it's first run to Kiama on the 15th of August.

R 753, allocated to 707 Operations, is currently stored out of service in a dismantled state and is used as a source of spare parts for R 707.

Below is a table indicating the status of preserved R class locomotives.

| Locomotive | Name | Livery | Gauge | Fuel | Current operator | Status | Other notes |
|---|---|---|---|---|---|---|---|
| R 700 | | VR Black & Red | 5' 3" Broad | Black Coal | Steamrail Victoria | Stored | Pending restoration at Newport |
| R 704 | | VR Black & Red | 5' 3" Broad | Black Coal | Newport Railway Museum | Static display | 1951 Festival of Britain Black & Red |
| R 707 | "City of Melbourne" | VR Black & Red | 5' 3" Broad | Black Coal | 707 Operations Inc. | Operational | |
| R 711 | "Spirit of Bendigo" | VR Blue and Gold | 5' 3" Broad | Oil | Steamrail Victoria | Operational | Owned by the City of Greater Bendigo |
| R 753 | | VR Black & Red | 5' 3" Broad | Black Coal | 707 Operations Inc. | Dismantled | Used as spare parts for R 707 |
| R 761 | | VR Black & Red | 5' 3" Broad | Black Coal | Steamrail Victoria | Operational | |
| R 766 | Formerly "City of Bendigo" | VR Black & Red | 4' 8½" Standard | Oil | Hunter Valley Railway Trust | Operational | In use on heritage tours with The Picnic Train. Converted from 5 ft 3 in (1,600 mm) Victorian broad gauge to 4 ft 8 1/2 in (1,435 mm) standard gauge |
