= Barry Railway Class D =

Steam tender engines

Type and origin
- Power type: Steam
- Designer: John Waddington Mann
- Builder: Sharp, Stewart & Co.
- Build date: 1889 and 1897
- Total produced: 4
Specifications
- Configuration
  - Whyte: 0-8-0
  - UIC: D n2
- Gauge: 4 ft 8 1/2 in (1,435 mm) standard gauge
- Driver dia.: 4 ft 3 in (1.295 m)
- Wheelbase: 15 ft 5 in (4.699 m)
- Loco weight: 48 long tons 17 cwt (109,400 lb or 49.6 t) (54.7 short tons)
- Fuel type: Coal
- Cylinders: Two outside
- Cylinder size: 20 in × 26 in (508 mm × 660 mm)
Performance figures
- Tractive effort: 27,200 lbf (120.99 kN)
Career
- Operators: Barry Railway; → Great Western Railway
- Delivered: 1889 and 1897
- Withdrawn: 1927–1930
- Disposition: All scrapped

Barry Railway Class D were 0-8-0 steam tender engines of the Barry Railway in South Wales. They were built to a standard Sharp, Stewart and Company design modified by John Waddington Mann, the Chief Mechanical Engineer for the Swedish & Norwegian Railway. In fact, 20 of these locomotives were ordered by this railway. However the company ran into severe financial difficulty with the result that only one and a half locomotives were paid for by the S&N.

== Barry purchases ==
Two of the locomotives, S&N 25 and 26, never reached overseas but were retained by Sharp, Stewart. They were later sold to the Barry Railway in October 1889 and became numbers 35 and 36. Two other locomotives, S&N 5 and 8, were seized by bailiffs in Norway in December 1891. There then followed a long drawn out legal dispute between Sharp, Stewart and Swedish & Norwegian Railway. It was not until May 1895 that the Supreme Court in Sweden found in favour of Sharp, Stewart and the engines in question were returned to the manufacturers. In late 1896, they were offered to the Barry Railway who took delivery of them in March and April 1897. The two locomotives were numbered 92 and 93. They were the first eight-coupled locomotives in UK service.

When the Barry Railway had need of more coal locomotives for coal trains on the Vale of Glamorgan Line it returned to Sharp Stewart, who had also supplied most of the locos on the railway, for similar engines to the Class D. The result was the Class H 0-8-2T, a tank locomotive variant with an additional rear pony truck, which allowed a coal and water capacity greater than that of the small Class D tender, whilst also being shorter and not requiring the use of turntables.

== Traffic duties ==
An attractive feature of these locomotives for the Barry Railway had been their short overall length, due to their diminutive four-wheeled tenders. This made them unusually short for their power, suitable for the Barry Railway's restrictively short turntables, and their resultant limited range was not an issue for the short journeys of the Welsh mineral traffic.

On arrival, the locomotives did very little main line duty but were confined to pulling heavy coal trains from Cadoxton Yard to Barry Docks. However, in 1909, 92 and 93 were assigned to haul mineral trains from the coal pits on the Rhymney branch of the Brecon and Merthyr to Cadoxton Yard and were mechanically modified for the purpose.

Some fittings were modified on adoption in the UK, and later by the GWR. The original Salter safety valve fitted to the dome was removed, relying solely on the pop valves also fitted. Minor fittings, such as the handrails, were replaced by more GWR styles. The tenders were fitted with vertical weatherboards and spectacle windows. In 1922, on absorption by the GWR, their cabs were rebuilt more extensively, without the side windows but with an extended rear roof, they also gained the typical GWR flared brass cover to their safety valves.

== Withdrawal ==
The locomotives passed to the Great Western Railway in 1922 but were withdrawn between 1927 and 1930. All members of the class were scrapped.

== Numbering ==
Year	Quantity	Manufacturer	Serial numbers	Barry numbers	GWR numbers	Notes
1886	1	Sharp Stewart	3365	92	1389	Acquired by Barry Railway April 1897
1887	1	Sharp Stewart	3394	93	1390	Acquired by Barry Railway March 1897
1888	2	Sharp Stewart	3446–3447	35–36	1387–1388	Acquired by Barry Railway October 1889
