= Boxpok =

Type of steam locomotive wheel

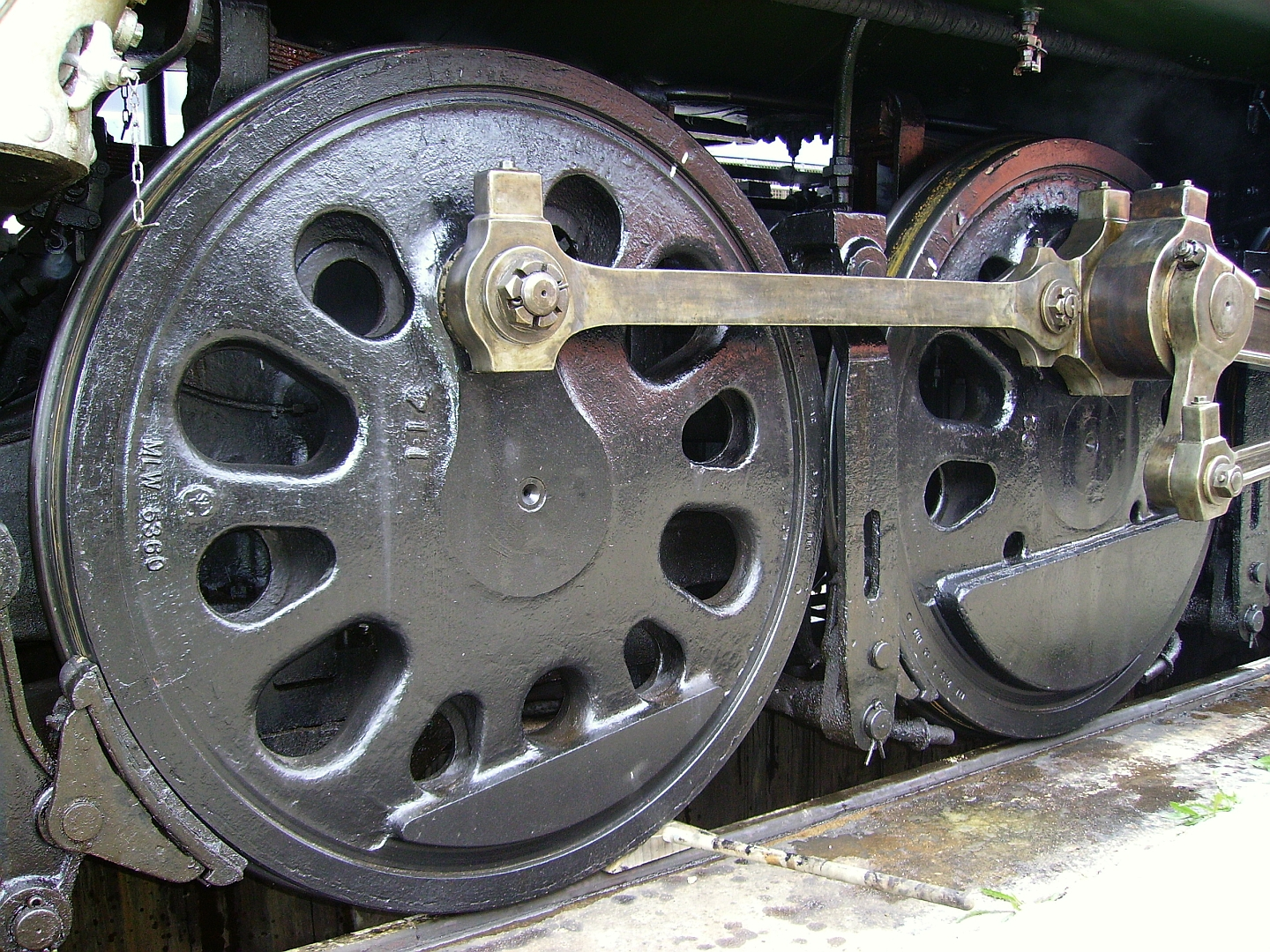
Boxpok driving wheels

A Boxpok is a steam locomotive wheel that gains its strength through being made of a number of box sections rather than having traditional solid spokes (the name is a variation on "box-spoke"). Being hollow, they allow better counterbalancing and stability than conventional drivers, which is important for fast locomotives. The Boxpok wheel was patented by General Steel Castings Corporation of Granite City, Illinois.

== Other wheels ==
The Boxpok was the most common of the four types of disk driving wheels used by US steam locomotive designers, the others being the Baldwin and Scullin. The fourth design, the Universal, was used in locomotive rebuilds. All vary slightly in appearance but have essentially the same in structure.

The term "Boxpok" is also sometimes used incorrectly to describe the Bulleid Firth Brown (BFB) driving wheel used on British locomotives at the same time. However, although similar to the Boxpok, one side of each box section of the BFB is left open, so is not a true box structure, unlike the Boxpok, Baldwin and Scullin drivers.

== See also ==
- SCOA-P wheel
