= H line =

H line may refer to:

- H Line (RTD), a light rail line in Denver and Aurora, Colorado, U.S.
- H Line, a portion of the North Carolina Railroad between Greensboro and Cary, North Carolina, US
- H (Los Angeles Railway), former streetcar service
- Line H (Buenos Aires Underground), a metro line in Buenos Aires, Argentina
- The 404.7nm emission band from a Mercury-vapor lamp
- The calcium H line, an absorption line in the Sun's spectrum at 396.9nm
- Pencil skirt, sometimes called a H-line skirt

== See also ==
- H band (disambiguation)
