= Language H =

Programming language

- Paradigm: procedural
- First appeared: 1962

Influenced by
- COBOL

Language H is a proprietary, procedural programming language created by NCR based on COBOL. The first compiler was developed in August 1962 to run on the National-Elliott 405M and produce object code for the National-Elliott 803B. It is believed that the "H" stands for John C Harwell.

== Syntax ==
Language H programs consist of a heading section followed by sets of statements called "chapters." Comments are introduced and terminated by asterisks. It has 84 reserved keywords. Some of them are:

READ, PRINT, PUNCH, NUMBER, MAX, BEING, FROM, CHANNEL, DIGIT, STERLING, CHARACTERS, UP, TO, RADICES, QUANTITY, DECIMAL, POINT, INADMISSIBLE, INPUT, CONTROL, ERROR, SEEN-CHARACTER, OPERAND, CALCULATE, HOLD, OFF, ON, SEE, AT, POSITION, PLACES, FILE, GET, AGAIN, WITH, FINISH, REEL-END, UNOBTAINABLE, END-OF-FILE, MARKER, BRANCH, OR, GET-AGAIN, ACCORDING, SEQUENTIAL, FILING, DUMP, DATA, PROCESSING, PROGRAM, FOR, CHAPTER, NOTE, IN, OBEY, AND, ARE, AT, BY, IN, IS
