= Kalevi Heikkinen =

Finnish member of the Lapua movement

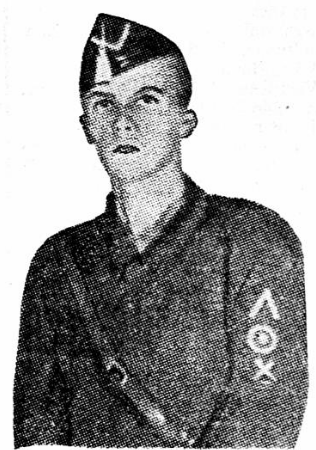
Heikkinen in Falangist uniform

Arvo Kalevi Heikkinen (25 May 1911 – 1 December 1940) was a Finnish member of the Lapua movement, known for his involvement in the murder of Yrjö Holm, a municipal councilor from Forssa, in 1930. Later, he fought in the Spanish Civil War on the side of the fascists led by General Francisco Franco. The detective who interrogated Heikkinen regarding Holm's murder characterized him as an "ideological fanatic".

== Murder of Yrjö Holm ==
Heikkinen, born in Kestilä, Finland, returned home from his military conscription as a sergeant. He then worked as a business assistant until he started studying at Evo Forestry College. In the summer of 1930, he became interested in the extreme right-wing Lapua movement and began to lead its strike group operating in Loimaa. The group committed commit three kidnappings. One of these, the attempted kidnapping of Yrjö Holm, a former member of the Loimaa town council then living in Forssa, on the night of 3–4 July, resulted in the killing of the target. Rather than submitting to the kidnappers, Holm defended himself and was eventually being killed in the resulting exchange of fire.

Following the death of Holm, the authorities first suspected Paavo Markkula of having shot Holm. After Markkula was arrested, Heikkinen organized a demonstration by 800 supporters of the Lapua movement in Forssa on 4 November to get him released. After Markkula's release, both Heikkinen and Enso Kivikoski, a student, were suspected of having shot Holm, but in the end no one was convicted of the murder. However, in 1931, Heikkinen received a nine-month suspended sentence from the Court of Appeal in Turku for three counts of false imprisonment. Following his sentence, Heikkinen worked as an advertisement seller for the newspaper published by the Lapua movement and the Patriotic People's Movement (IKL) youth organization Blue-and-Blacks, until he became unemployed after the organization was disbanded in 1936.

== Spanish Civil War ==
In early 1937, Heikkinen decided to join the Spanish Foreign Legion to fight in the ranks of the Falangists in the Spanish Civil War that had broken out in July 1936. In February, he traveled with a group of ten Finns on the S/S Wappu steamship from Kotka to Hamburg, where the men contacted the head of Nazi Germany's propaganda department, Heinrich Hoffmann. This led them to the talks of a Spanish recruiter who arranged a trip via Lisbon to Spain. Olavi Karpalo, who later fought in the SS forces of Nazi Germany, joined the Spanish Foreign Legion with Heikkinen.

Heikkinen fought on the Madrid front under the pseudonym "Arbo Kalbi". In April, Heikkinen was wounded by a grenade fragment that hit his head, and transferred to the military hospital in Palencia, where he wrote about his war experiences in IKL's Ajan Suunta magazine under the pen name "H". Heikkinen was soon transferred to Ceuta from where he continued to write for various magazines of IKL, this time under the pen name "KH" and later also reported under his own name for Ilta-Sanomat.

== Return ==
In September 1937, Heikkinen returned to Finland together with the journalist Veikko E. Rutanen. In November, he got a job as the editor of IKL's Lakeus newspaper published in Seinäjoki.

In March 1938, Heikkinen started as a prison guard at Helsinki County Prison, but he was arrested after only a month in connection with the murder of Yrjö Holm. Even in the new trial, the murder charge could not be proven, but Heikkinen received another five-month sentence for false imprisonment. He died of the injuries obtained in Spain in December 1940, aged 29.
