= H band =

H band may refer to:

- H band (infrared), an atmospheric transmission window centred on 1.65 μm
- H band (NATO), a radio frequency band from 6 to 8 GHz
- H band, part of the sarcomere

== See also ==
- H line (disambiguation)
