= Barry Railway Class H =

Class of Welsh 0-8-2T steam locomotives

Type and origin
- Power type: Steam
- Builder: Sharp, Stewart & Co.
- Serial number: 4182–4188
- Build date: 1896
- Total produced: 7
Specifications
- Configuration
  - Whyte: 0-8-2T
  - UIC: D1 n2t
- Gauge: 4 ft 8 1/2 in (1,435 mm) standard gauge
- Driver dia.: 4 ft 3 in (1.295 m)
- Trailing dia.: 3 ft 6 in (1.067 m)
- Wheelbase: 15 ft 5 in (4.699 m)
- Length: 38 ft 5 in (11.709 m)
- Loco weight: 73 long tons 0 cwt (163,500 lb or 74.2 t) (81.8 short tons)
- Fuel type: Coal
- Firebox
  - Grate area: 22.75 sq ft (2.114 m^{2})
- Boiler pressure: 150 psi (1.03 MPa)
- Heating surface: 1,119 sq ft (104.0 m^{2})
- Superheater: None
- Cylinders: Two
- Cylinder size: 20 in × 26 in (508 mm × 660 mm)
- Valve gear: Stephenson
Performance figures
- Tractive effort: 25,920 lbf (115.30 kN)
Career
- Operators: BR → GWR
- Numbers: Barry: 79–85, GWR: 1380–1386
- Withdrawn: 1925–1930
- Disposition: All scrapped

The Barry Railway Class H was a small class of seven 0-8-2T tank locomotives built for the Barry Railway by Sharp Stewart in 1896. When they were introduced they were the first locomotives in Britain to use the 0-8-2 wheel arrangement.

== History ==
The class originated from the four earlier Class D 0-8-0 tender locomotives. These were purchased from Sharp, Stewart and Company, who had originally built them for the Swedish & Norwegian Railway. One appealing feature the class had were their short overall length, due to their small four-wheeled tenders. This made them unusually short for their power, suitable for the Barry Railway's restrictively short turntables, and their limited range was not an issue for the short journeys of the Welsh mineral traffic.

When the Barry Railway needed more locomotives for coal trains on the Vale of Glamorgan Line, it returned to Sharp Stewart (who had also supplied most of the locos on the railway) for similar engines to the Class D. The result was the Class H 0-8-2T, which had the same small driving wheels to give a high tractive effort, and were heavy (for the time) giving good braking. They were built as tank locomotives with an additional rear pony truck that allowed a greater coal and water capacity than that of the small Class D tender, whilst also being shorter and not requiring the use of turntables. Seven locomotives were delivered in 1896, and numbered 79–85, the numbers being carried on an oval plate attached to the side tanks. Once delivered, however, the Class H locos were employed in hauling heavy coal trains between Barry Docks and the large yard at Cadoxton, with this task being their main duty in service.

With the grouping in 1922, the Barry Railway became part of the Great Western Railway, which renumbered the locos 1380–1386, placing the new numbers on the bunker behind the cab door, and designating them 1380 class in the GWR records. Improvements were made to numbers 1380 and 1383 at Swindon Works, including GWR pattern safety bonnets, enlarged bunkers, new buffers and an extended smokebox. These changes added an extra ton to their total weight. At the same time the boiler pressure on these two locos was raised by 10 psi (69 kPa), with the tractive effort also being increased appropriately. Despite this the class were non-standard in GWR terms, and were all scrapped between 1925 and 1930.
