= Aitch (surname) =

Aitch is an English surname. Notable people with the surname include:

- Iain Aitch, English writer, journalist, and artist
- Matt Aitch (1944–2007), American basketball player
