= H-class submarine =

H class submarine can refer to

- Holland 602 type submarine
- British H-class submarine - the 42 Holland 602 types built for British use and serving in the Royal Navy
- Danish H class submarine also known as Havmanden class - 407 tonne submarines of the 1930s serving in the Danish Navy
- United States H-class submarine - the nine Holland 602 that served in the US Navy.
