= Tasmanian Government Railways H class (1889) =

Type and origin
- Power type: Steam
- Builder: Lokomotivfabrik Krauss & Co
- Serial number: 2180, 2589, 2459, 5084
- Build date: 1889
- Total produced: 4
Specifications
- Configuration
  - Whyte: 0-4-0WT
- Gauge: 2 ft (610 mm)
- Driver dia.: 2 ft 0 in (610 mm)
- Loco weight: 5.5 long tons 0 cwt (12,300 lb or 5.6 t)
- Fuel type: Coal
- Boiler pressure: 175 lbf/in^{2} (1.21 MPa)
- Cylinder size: 7 in × 12 in (178 mm × 305 mm)
Performance figures
- Tractive effort: 3,430 lbf (15.26 kN)
Career
- Operators: Tasmanian Government Railways
- Numbers: H1-H4
- Disposition: All scrapped

The Tasmanian Government Railways H class was a class of 0-4-0WT steam locomotives operated by the Tasmanian Government Railways.

== History ==
In 1889, 1891 and 1892 three similar 0-4-0WT locomotives were built by Lokomotivfabrik Krauss & Co, Germany use by contractors building railway lines in Tasmania. All were purchased by the Tasmanian Government Railways who purchased a fourth locomotive new. They primarily were used as shunters.

In 1906, H2 and H3 were sold to the Victorian Public Works Department. The former was sold again in 1908 to the Corrimal Colliery while H3 was sold in 1910 to the Rubicon Timber Company. H4 was sold in 1927 to the Catamaran Colliery in Tasmania.

== Namesake ==
The H class designation was reused by the H class introduced in 1951.
