= Tasmanian Government Railways H class (1951) =

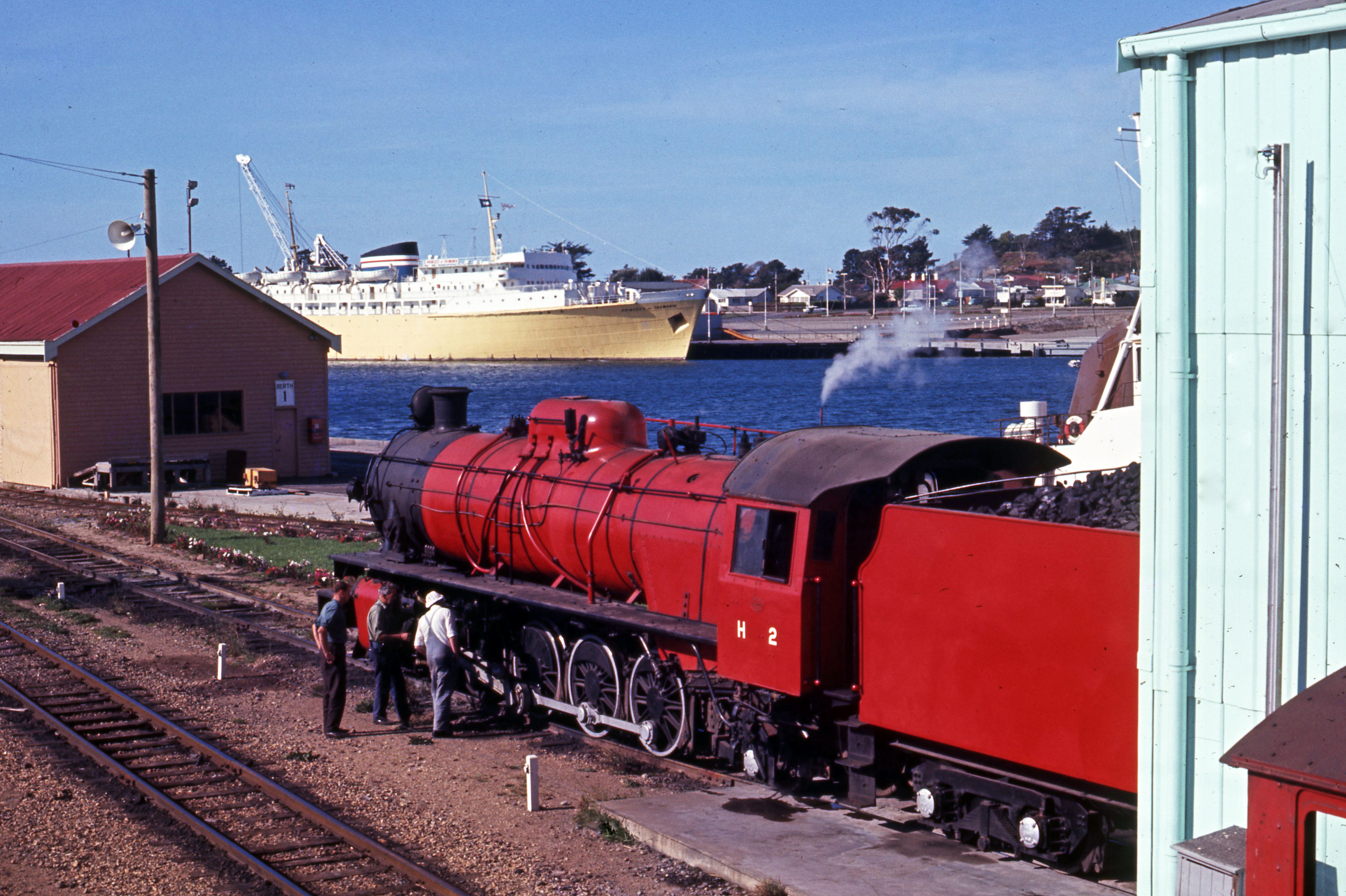
- H2 at Devonport in 1970
Type and origin
- Power type: Steam
- Builder: Vulcan Foundry
- Serial number: 5949-5956
- Build date: 1951
- Total produced: 8
Specifications
- Configuration
  - Whyte: 4-8-2
- Gauge: 1,067 mm (3 ft 6 in)
- Driver dia.: 4 ft 0 in (1,219 mm)
- Total weight: 111 long tons 0 cwt (248,600 lb or 112.8 t)
- Fuel type: Coal
- Boiler pressure: 200 lbf/in^{2} (1.38 MPa)
- Cylinder size: 18 in × 24 in (457 mm × 610 mm)
Performance figures
- Tractive effort: 27,540 lbf (122.50 kN)
Career
- Operators: Tasmanian Government Railways
- Numbers: H1-H8
- Withdrawn: 1961-1975
- Preserved: H1-H2, H5-H8
- Disposition: 6 preserved, 2 scrapped

The Tasmanian Government Railways H class is a class of 4-8-2 steam locomotives operated by the Tasmanian Government Railways.

== History ==
In October 1951, the Tasmanian Government Railways (TGR) took delivery of eight H locomotives from the Vulcan Foundry, Newton-le-Willows built at the same time and basic design as the Gold Coast Railway 248 class in Ghana. They were delivered in a new emerald green livery. Four were later repainted red.

As they fell due for overhaul, withdrawals began in 1961. H2 received a major overhaul in 1966/67, the last of the class to receive such work. Two (H2 and H5) took part in the Centenary of Rail in Tasmania celebrations in February 1971 H5 was withdrawn after this but H2 worked periodically before being finally withdrawn in 1975. All remained in store until disposed of between 1974 and 1978.

=== Preservation ===
- H1 at the Tasmanian Transport Museum, Glenorchy
- H2 at the Derwent Valley Railway
- H5 at the Derwent Valley Railway
- H6 plinthed in Perth, Tasmania (locomotive only)
- H7 at the Don River Railway
- H8 at the Invermay Rail Heritage Precinct (loco chassis only)

== Namesake ==
The H class designation was previously used by the H class, the last of which was withdrawn before 1930.
