= Arthur Slater (disambiguation) =

Arthur Slater (1908–1976) was an English footballer

Arthur Slater may also refer to:

- Arthur 'Syd' Slater (1914–1994), policeman and Australian rules footballer for Essendon and North Melbourne
- Arthur Slater (footballer, born 1890) (1890–1972), Australian rules footballer for Essendon
