= Organ Pipes National Park =

National park in Australia

- IUCN category III (natural monument or feature)
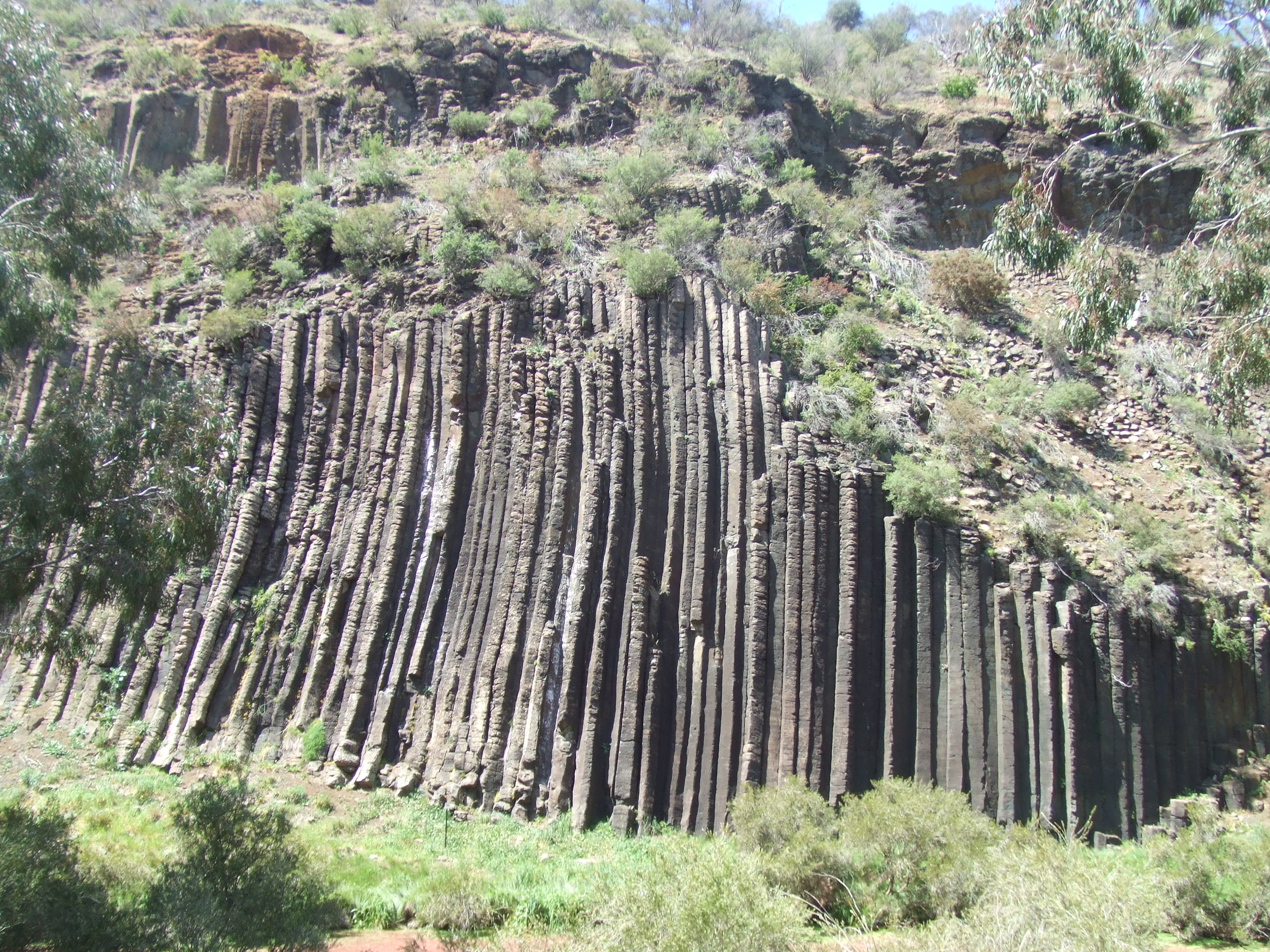
- Organ Pipes geological feature.

- Location within Victoria
- Location: Victoria
- Nearest city: Melbourne
- Coordinates: 37°40′07″S 144°46′02″E
- Area: 1.21 km^{2} (0.47 sq mi)
- Established: 12 March 1972
- Visitors: 50,000 (in 1996–7)
- Governing body: Parks Victoria
- Website: Official website

The Organ Pipes National Park, abbreviated as OPNP, is a national park located in the Central region of Victoria, Australia. The 121-hectare (300-acre) protected area was established with the focus on conservation of the native flora and fauna, and preservation of the geological features in the Jacksons Creek, a part of the Maribyrnong valley, north-west of Melbourne. It is situated in a deep gorge in the grassy, basalt Keilor Plains.

Within Organ Pipes National Park, the valley walls of Jacksons Creek expose Pleistocene volcanic rocks of the New Volcanic Group. These 2.5 to 2.8 million year-old basalt lavas, commonly known as trap rock, fractured during cooling into vertically standing, hexagonal basalt columns. These columns are locally known as the "organ pipes" for which this park is named. Over the last one to two million years, the slow cutting by Jackson Creek of its valley down into the basaltic plains and through the underlying trap rock exposed these geological structures. The bottom of the valley of Jackson Creek also exposes a prehistoric buried creek valley, which is cut into 400 million year-old (Silurian) mudstones and sandstones. The bottom of this buried valley contains ancient creek gravel. Both the ancient river valley and the Silurian sedimentary rock lies buried beneath the basaltic volcanic rocks of the New Volcanic Group. Marine fossils found in the Silurian sedimentary rocks demonstrate that they accumulated beneath a prehistoric ocean.

A Friends' group, (the first in Australia) the "Friends of Organ Pipes" (FOOPS), comprising conservation activists to support the efforts of rehabilitation of the OPNP's indigenous flora and fauna, supplemented the work of the Victoria Park system under which the OPNP was declared a National Park. The park's importance to the whole region as a "center for education about the geology, flora and fauna of the Keilor Plains, and the restoration of degraded land" is important. With its inclusion in the IUCN Category III (Natural Monuments) of the United Nations' list of National Parks and Protected Areas, there is a greater recognition of the need to protect or preserve outstanding natural features.

== Geography ==
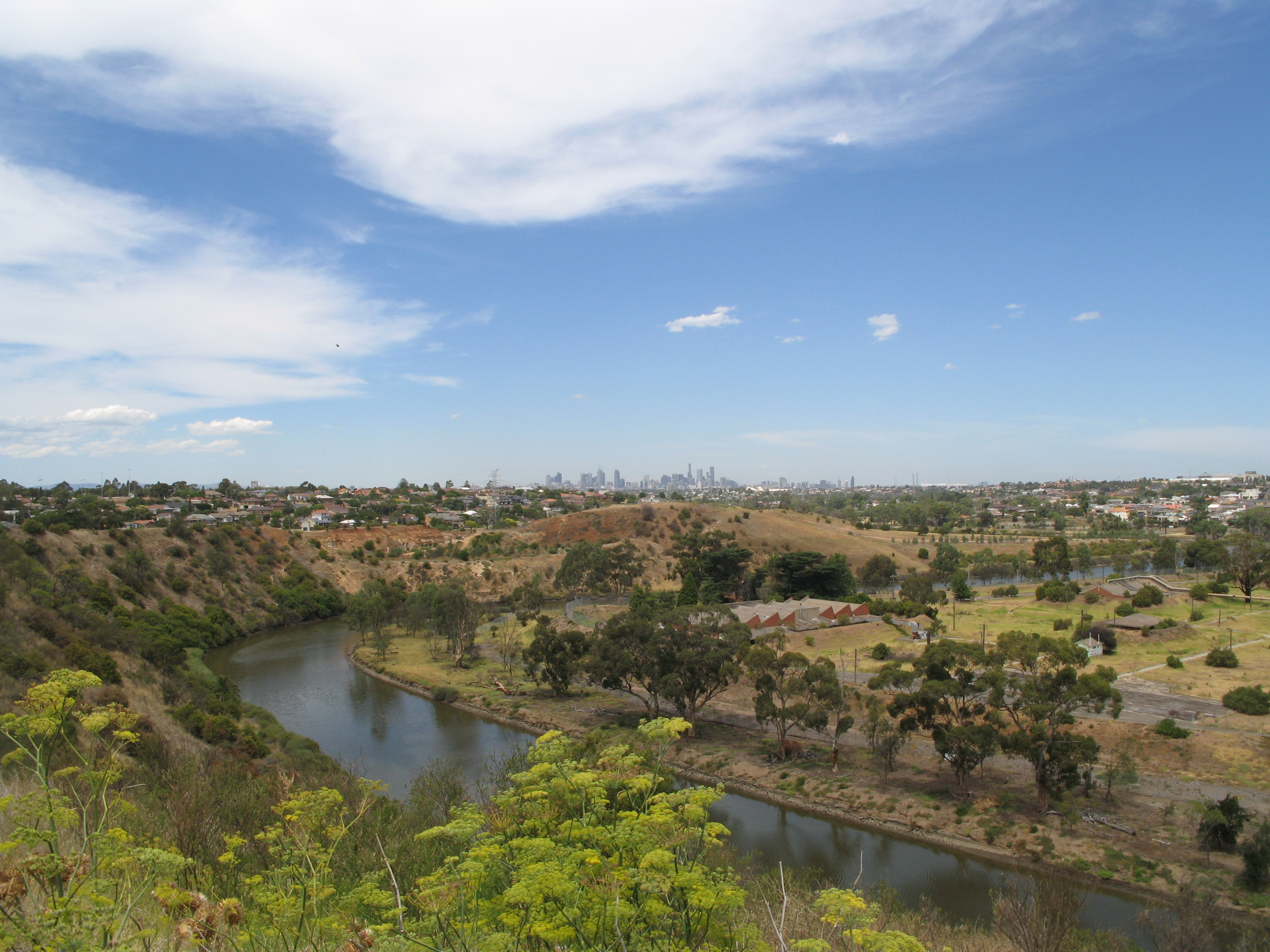
The Maribyrnong River as it flows past the Melbourne suburb of Essendon West

The national park, designated to cover an area of 121 hectares (300 acres), is situated 20 kilometres (12 mi) to the northwest of Melbourne city. It is part of the Victoria Park system. It is approachable from the Calder Highway. The road network around the park consists of the Calder Highway on the south and the Calder Raceway also on the southern direction but close to its entrance. The Jacksons Creek, which is at the heart of the park, is bounded by the City of Hume on the northern side while the City of Brimbank is to its south; Deep Creek and Keilor Plains to the west of Melbourne are also part of this geographical setting. The complementary areas to the park are the Holden Flora Reserve (65 hectares (160 acres)), Holden School Site (25 hectares (62 acres)), Derrimut Grassland Reserve (154 hectares (380 acres)) and Laverton and North Grassland Reserve (52 hectares (130 acres)). Out of the total area of 121 hectares (300 acres), the conservation area is 107.3 hectares (265 acres) (88.6%), conservation and recreation area is 13 hectares (32 acres) (10.8%), visitor center accounts for 0.7 hectares (1.7 acres) (0.6%), and 2 hectares (4.9 acres) (1.6%) is the special management area. The park is drained by Jacksons Creek. This with Deep Creek and Mount Emu creek are the major tributaries of the Maribyrnong River, which has a catchment area of 1,300 square kilometres (500 sq mi). Jackson Creek rises in the Wombat State Forest, flows east to the Roslynn Reservoir, joining Deep Creek near Sydenham Park. It outflows from the reservoir through Gisborne, Sunbury before flowing through Organ Pipes National Park.

== Climate ==
The park lies in a rain shadow area. According to records maintained at Melbourne Airport since 1972, the average annual rainfall in the park area is 580 millimetres (23 in) (occurs during winter and spring). Occasionally, heavy rainfall occurs in the area and one such event caused heavy floods during winter in the flood plains of Maribyrnong, in September 1993, causing loss of vegetation, destroying the viewing platform and also scouring the banks of the creek.

== History ==
=== Early period ===
The earliest settlers in the plains of the park area and its vicinity were the Australian Aboriginal Woiworung people of the Kulin nation in the Yarra and Maribyrnong River valleys. Jackson Creek formed part of the boundary between two clan estates, Marin–Bulluk and Wurundjeri–Willam. They were farmers and hunters who lived on the forest products and harvested grass species and spear grass (Stipa spp.) that were grown and regrown in the area of the Keilor Plains after burning every year. The climate and rainfall also favoured growth of native grasses in the rolling plains. Animal species such as kangaroos, dingoes, tiger, bandicoots, gliders and platypuses were common. Bird species of cockatoos, kookaburras, quails, finches and hawks also flourished. The vegetation was lush with grass lands and plenty of plants with flowering blooms. Their habitation of the area is established by archaeological findings in the area in the form of their campsites and isolated artefacts within the park. The environment along Jackson Creek environment facilitated shelter, water and plentiful food for their original settlement.

=== European settlers' period ===
In early 19th century, Europeans from Tasmania started settling in the area. They were chiefly responsible for introducing several species of exotic plants and animals into the area as they found the terrain to be drab and filled with strange animals like kangaroo. They introduced new variety of plants such as boxthorn hedges for fences and trees such as oaks, willows and pine, creating an ambiance of their homeland. Kangaroos were hunted, rabbits and furred animals were killed for their valuable skin. This had ill effects on the native vegetation and faunal species. So much so that "high artichoke thistles blanketed the creek flats and slopes, horehound had spread everywhere, boxthorn bushes crowded the slopes and plains, and other weed species filled the gaps. Erosion gullies scarred the steep slopes. Rubbish was piled here and there".

During this period, there was a hamlet near the Organ Pipes and a suspension bridge across Jacksons Creek to reach a school and farm lands that surrounded the village. The Hall family lived here between 1870 and the 1920s; their plum tree orchards still exist. The European settlers' period is also borne out by archaeological artefacts in the form of bluestone walls. The stables in the park area were built by the Halls in which the Hayes family lived, and a Jackson Bay fig tree is located near the Information Center. The Bartlett family lived here from 1934 to 1948 and the last owner was E. A. Green. His estate became the property of Stan Payne which was eventually donated to the Organ Pipes National Park in 1972.

=== National Park period ===
Consequent to the deterioration of the environmental conditions, the well-meaning, environmentally conscious citizens decided to rehabilitate the environment by reinvigorating the area. The first step towards this end was initiated by the National Park Service in 1972 by declaring initially an area of 65 hectares (160 acres) of the land donated by the E. A. Green Charitable Foundation as a national park. Under Schedule 2 of The National Parks Act 1971 (Vic.), the area was declared as National Park on 12 March 1972. There were several objectives of this declaration, but the intent was to restore the park with both direct and indirect interventions to improve the ecosystem. Direct intervention came in the form of planting indigenous species as seedlings, and indirect format was to de-weed the area. As a result, the overstorey plants of indigenous variety and understorey species are now well established.

An area of 20 hectares (49 acres) of land was added under the National Parks (Amendment) Act 1978 (Vic.) and another 36 hectares (89 acres) of Crown land (including land acquired previously forcibly for the Park) was added on 4 June 1997. The National Parks Act enjoins on the Director of the park "to preserve and protect the natural environment of the Park, and its natural and other features". It also stipulates the use of the park by the public for enjoyment, recreation and education, apart from the needed research. The Park Regulations 1992 Section 4 (Objects) is related to visitor activities and Section 17 of the National Parks Act governs the management of the Park. The Park is also reserved as a "Geological Monument" under the final recommendations for the Melbourne Study Area (LCC 1977) and also continues as a National Park for the Melbourne Area District 1 Review (LCC 1987). Fire Protection Plan, Port Phillip Area (former Melbourne Region) (CNR 1996); Draft Conservation Program for Native Grasslands and Grassy Woodlands in Victoria (CNR 1992) and Code of Practice for Fire Management on Public Land (CNR 1995) are some of the other legalese connected with the park.

The particular site was chosen because of the presence of several interesting geological features, including the "Organ Pipes", themselves a pattern of vertical pipe-like rock structures exposed by the erosion of the creek, and a tessellated pavement, where the rock surface has been split into regular "tiles" by joints related to columnar jointing.

== Geological formations ==
The Keilor Plains, where the geomorphological and geological features of heritage value are located, is part of the greater Western Volcanic Plains which cover a large part of western Victoria and extend into south-eastern South Australia and are stated to be the third largest lava plains in the world. These landforms were created by the incision of the Jacksons Creek into thick lava flows that erupted about 2.5 to 2.8 million years ago during the Pleistocene Period. These lavas overlie steeply dipping Silurian sedimentary rocks.

Sedimentary rock and fossils found in the park are also dated back 400 million years, an indication that the area was once a sea. The rocks seen in the park have mostly dark grey or brown colour. Graptolites are seen as fossils of sea snails, sea worms and extinct floating animals in the rocks here. About 2.5 to 2.8 million years ago giant lava flows known as a flood basalt spread across the land from surrounding volcanoes.

Rock exposures of Silurian mudstones and jointed structural features of basalt are spread at many locations in the form of Basalt cliffs, boulder screes and sedimentary escarpments. The geological features in the Park, all of volcanic origin, have been categorized under the broad heads namely, the Organ Pipes, Tessellated Pavement, Rosette Rock, Scoria cone and the Sandstone layer.

=== Organ Pipes ===
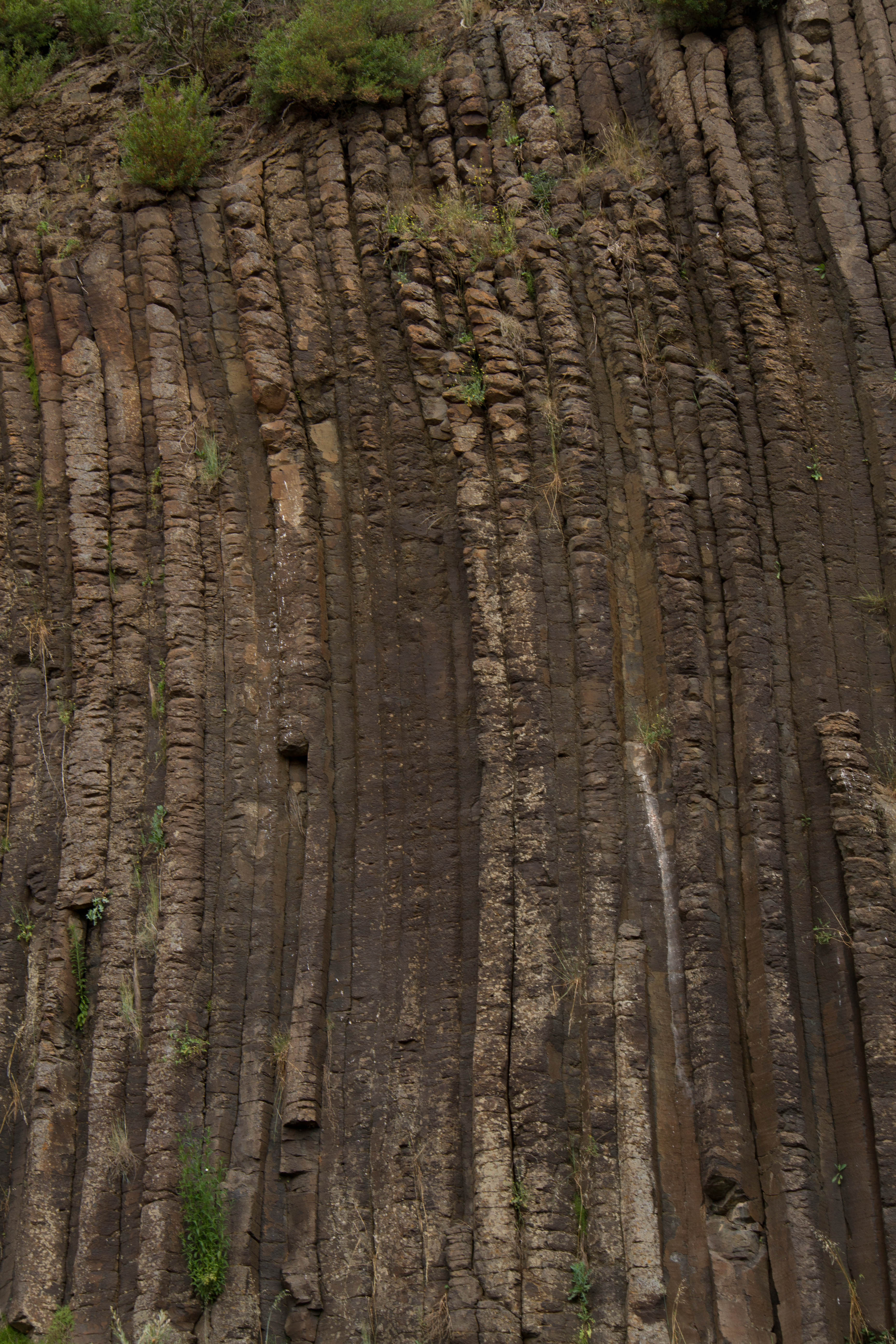
"Organ Pipe" Geological Formations

Jackson Creek, which meets with Deep Creek to become the Maribyrnong River, has slowly worn a deep valley in the basaltic plain formation of hard, dark rock revealing the old volcanic geological formations such as the hexagonal basalt columns known as the "Organ Pipes"; the lava deposit in the bed of the creek is of the order of 70 metres (230 ft). As the lava cooled over several years the interior molten lava got insulated and developed into undisturbed columns of basalt (with uniform composition) as the lava heat dissipated. The cooling effect caused shrinkage and as scientifically elaborated:

"This shrinkage caused tension in the rock mass. Vertical (upward and downward) tension could be accommodated by the elastic molten rock beneath but horizontal tension could not be relieved and so the basalt cracked. The rock usually cracks in a hexagonal pattern (six sides), but columns with up to eight sides are found. The rock was still hot (about 400 °C (752 °F)) when the columns were formed. Further contraction took place as the rock lost its remaining heat; this was relieved by horizontal cracking, causing some columns to look like stacks of Dutch cheese."

As seen now, the rock formation rises to a height of 20 metres (66 ft) and is considered as the best example of columnar jointing in Victoria.

The unusual shape of Jackson Creek Organ Pipes is attributed to the columnar structure which is rare and occurred at strategic location where the down cutting action of the stream created the post-volcanic valley. The Organ Pipes is so named as it resembles a pipe organ. The width of each pipe in the formation is about 1 metre (3 ft 3 in); only some of the columns are vertical while most other smaller columns around the Pipes are either inclined or horizontal.

=== Tessellated pavement ===
Tessellated pavement is an assortment of basalt columns that evolved as a result of erosion by the Jackson Creek, which is seen in the form of pavements about 250 meters upstream of the Rosette Rock. Frequent access to this formation is likely to cause deterioration of this formation.

=== Rosette Rock ===
Rosette rock is a radial array of basalt columns. Rosette rock formation seen about 500 metres (1,600 ft) upstream of the Organ Pipes is an overhanging rock on the northern bank of the stream. It is also an outcrop of basalt but with a radial array of columns akin to the spokes of a giant wheel. Its formation is attributed to the cooling of "a pocket of lava, probably in a spherical cave formed from an earlier lava flow".

=== Sandstone layer ===
The sandstone layer seen in the Jackson Creek has been dated to about 400 million years old. They are made of quartz and quartzite gravel, and are located midway between the car park and the Organ Pipes. They are stated to be part of a deep lead—an ancient stream bed buried by a lava flow, and later revealed by the downcutting of Jackson Creek. Deep leads were mined for gold in Ballarat during the Gold Rushes.

=== Soils ===
The volcanic soils in the park formed above basaltic rock base are found in the valleys and have gentle or flat slopes. Soil types have been classified as zonal types comprising red-brown earths (dominant type in the park with low permeability), grey duplex soils in flat areas (with high permeability) and uniform medium loams (on steep slopes on the southern direction of shallow depth and well drained); azonal soil types consisting of alluvial soils (fertile soils in the park consisting of clay loams to gravels suitable to grow tolerant plant species like river red gum and river bottle-brush), colluvial soils (at the toe of steep slopes of dark grey to dark brown in colour, suitable to grow wide variety of vegetation) and lithosols (reddish brown soils on steep slopes and frequently support boxthorn and indigenous lightwoods (Acacia implexa); and other lithosols which are pre-basaltic sands and gravels seen near the foot of Grey Box Gully and in lower slopes of the Jacksons Creek valley.

Soils in the park have been subject to erosion, weed growth, human activity and animal burrowing, particularly by rabbits. They are generally found not suitable for plant growth due to their poor water holding property. The degradation of the soils has been arrested with extensive re vegetation.

== Flora ==
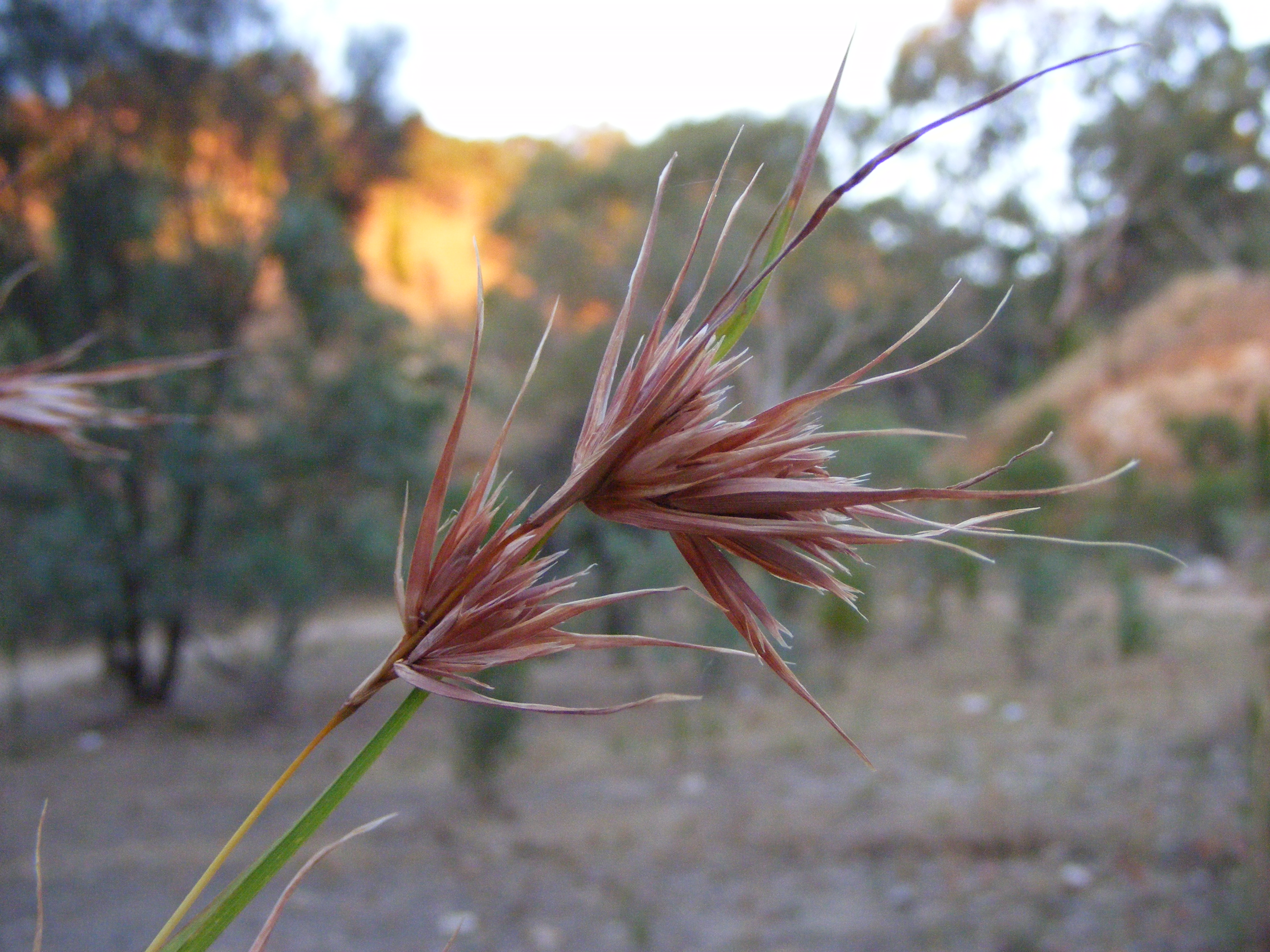
Kangaroo grass (Themeda triandra)

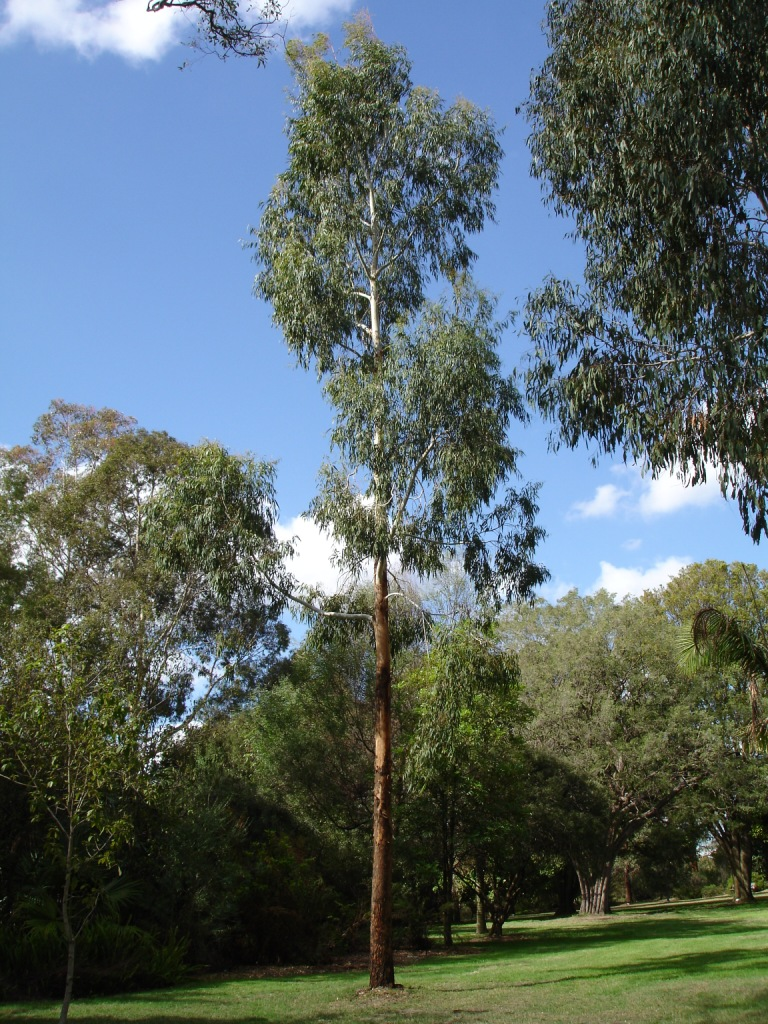
Manna gum (Eucalyptus viminalis)

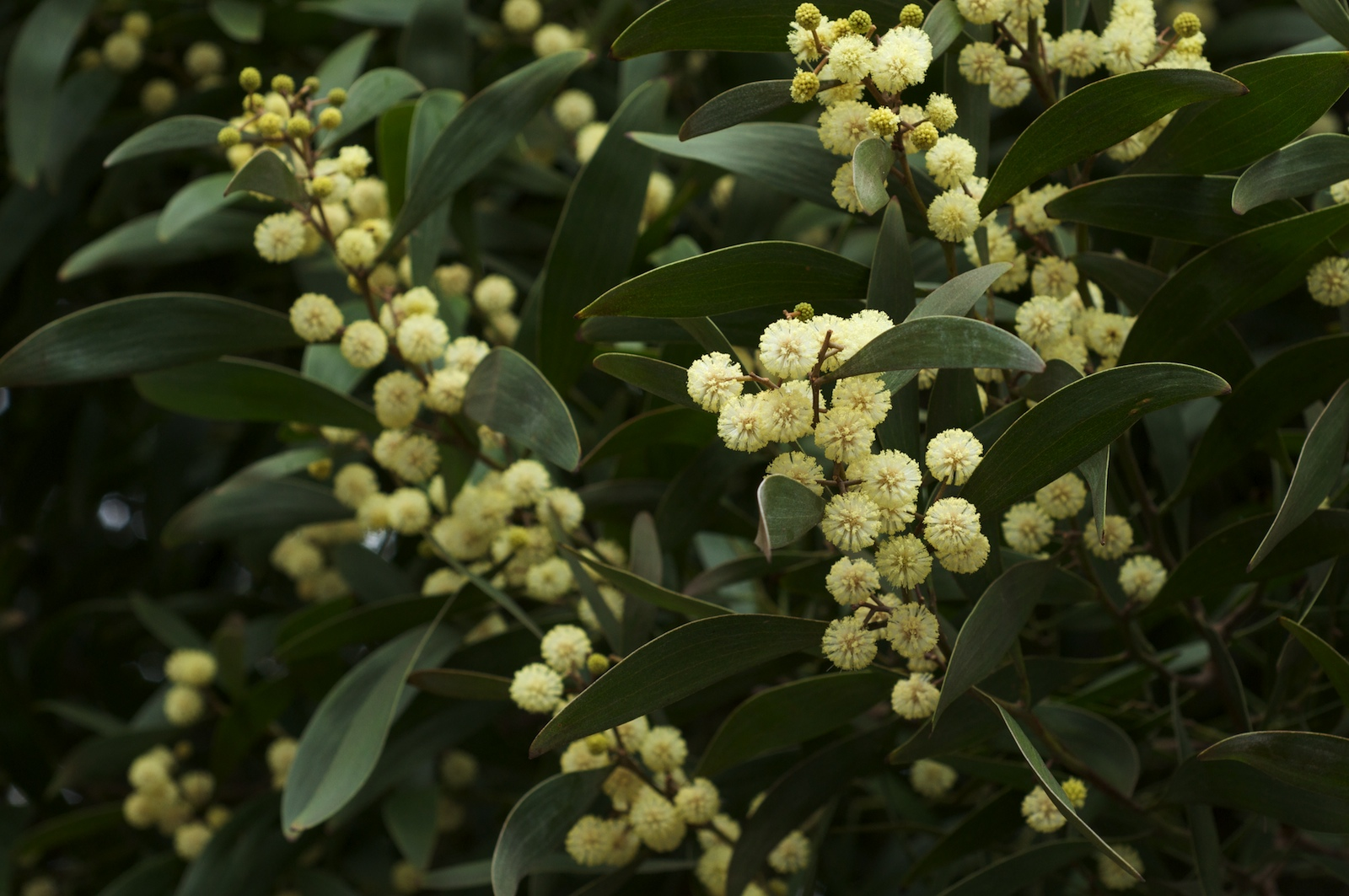
Australian blackwood (Acacia melanoxylon)

Intense propagation of vegetation of native species, in an otherwise plain degraded area infested with weeds (semblance of native vegetation seen mainly as thistles and boxthorns), started from the time of declaring the area as a national park in 1972. Work continued to remove introduced plants and vermin, and reintroduce natural vegetation and wildlife to the park. As of 2002, large areas of trees and shrubbery began to be re-established, systematic planting of native grass, plants and trees was started, which has created large swathes of kangaroo grass (Themeda triandra). The effect of the revegetation project in progress for now more than two decades has created a variety of ecosystems. Seven types of wattle were seen blooming at one time and many other indigenous plants.

Six types of vegetation witnessed, consequent to the re-vegetation programme launched by the Park Administration with assistance from FOOPS, are in three landform zones reflecting the soils derived from the underlying geology. These landforms are the plains and the escarpment. The overall picture of floral abundance that has emerged after the area was declared a national park is identification of 124 indigenous plant species including more than 20 species which are in the category of rare or threatened or significant. Some of the significantly recreated basalt plain grassland plants are: Chloris truncata (windmill grass—native species), Bothriochloa macra (or redleg grass which are red or purplish colour that grow in late summer), Rytidosperma species or wallaby grasses (important native pasture grasses), Dicanthium sericeum (silky bluegrass), Themeda triandra (kangaroo grass, a high protein grass), Rutidosis leptorrhynchoides (button wrinklewort—an endangered species) and Callitris glaucophylla (white cypress-pine or Murray pine).

On the banks of the valley formed by Jacksons Creek are found stray examples of remnant indigenous vegetation including river red gum riparian woodland (also manna gum and blackwood species), reed bed and sedgeland species and also shrub land and grasslands. The population of Callitris glaucophylla is one of only two found near Melbourne. Silky blue grass and red-leg grass are also noted in the park area adjoining the Sydenham Park.

The impact of the natural vegetation growth, however, is the loss of visibility of the geological formations.

== Fauna ==
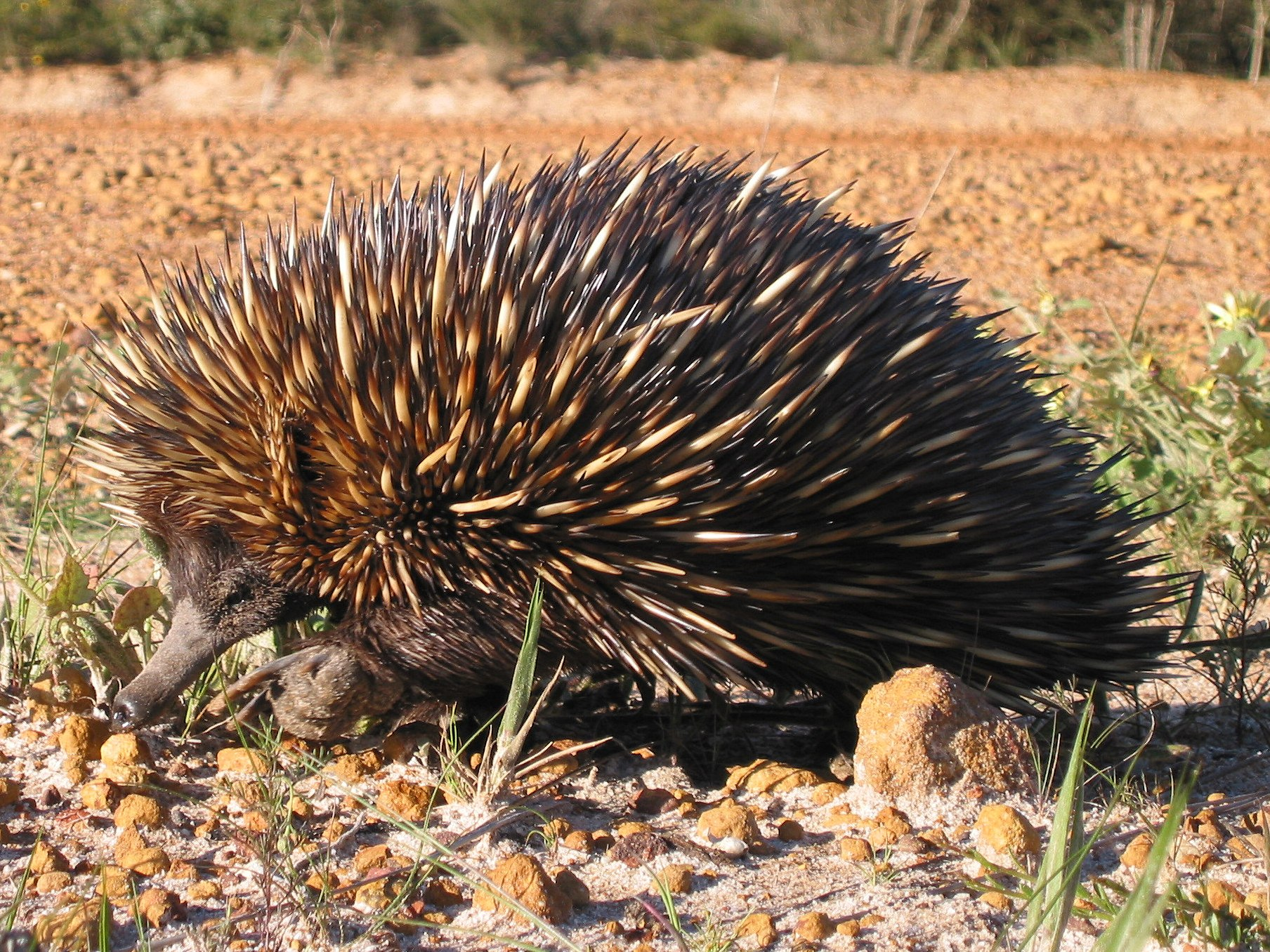
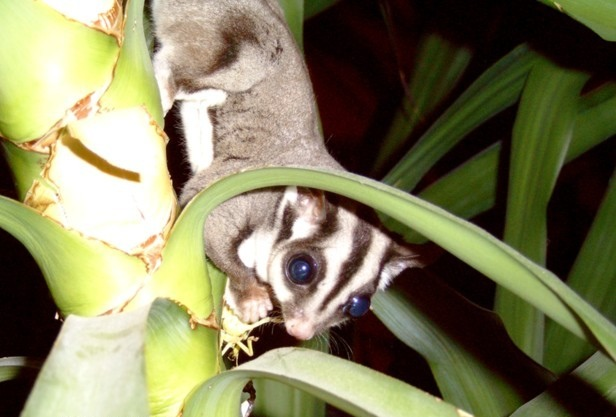
Left: Echidna. Right: Sugar glider relocated from Toolern Vale, Victoria

The diverse faunal significance of the OPNP is evident in the riparian, escarpment and grassland environments in the park. The faunal species found in the OPNP range from birds, mammals (such as eastern grey kangaroo, swamp wallaby), reptiles (including long-necked tortoise, the eastern bearded dragon, and the red-bellied black snake), and echidnas. With the park's programme of intensive induction of native vegetation in the area, several faunal species also started to proliferate. A 1988 mammal survey conducted at OPNP by the Arthur Rylah Institute for Environmental Research found bats to be the most diverse group of native mammals in occurrence. A very successful bat roosting box project has been underway for twenty years. Avifaunal species (such as the wedge-tailed eagle) are proliferating. Growling grass frog, and many indigenous fish species (such as the mountain galaxias) have also reappeared. The sugar glider (Petaurus breviceps) which was previously in the OPNP in 1916 was relocated into the park in 1989 from Toolern Vale. This is one of many projects run by the Friends of the Organ Pipes National Park. Overall, OPNP authorities have reported 15 mammal native species, 88 species of avifauna, 13 reptile species and six amphibian species.

== Management plan ==
A Management Plan was approved by the Conservation and Management of Parks, Victoria under Section 17 of the National Parks Act 1975 (Vic.), in 1996, with the objective of conserving nature and to provide exposure to the public at large to the natural and cultural heritages of the national parks as also promote tourism. For this purpose, the park has been divided into management zones to provide a geographical context to manage the park, appropriate actions to be taken to meet the specific requirements of the zones, avoid any conflicting actions and review the progress achieved from time to time. Some of the set management actions taken over the years to bring in a change from a degraded ecosystem to a near natural ecosystem are: Weed control through mechanical and chemical methods with occasional use of fire; removal of noxious weeds, vermin control, check on growth of rabbits, and rehabilitation of degraded land through a major re-vegetation programme with erosion control, maintaining seed banks and nurseries. Organ Pipes were formed approximately a million years ago when huge quantities of molten lava were ejected from volcanoes near what is now Sunbury and flowed over the Keilor Plains.

An Information Center, maintained by the Park Administration in the park precincts, disseminates information on the volcanic formations in the park, Aboriginals who lived in the area, about early European settlements, the re-vegetation project of the once degraded park and its role among national parks in conservation and preservation of the ecology of the area.

== Attractions ==
The park is also a popular tourist destination as it houses the Organ Pipes, The Tessellated Pavement, the Rosette Rock and much more. There is a Visitors Center and picnic area next to the car park and short walking tracks down a rather steep hill to Jacksons Creek and the rock features.

The park is under the flight path of Melbourne Airport and adjacent to the Calder Park Raceway so aircraft and/or motor sport noise can be a feature of a visit. The birds and other animals seem to be unaffected by this and an early morning or dusk visit will be rewarded by sightings of swamp wallabies and eastern grey kangaroos.

== See also ==
- Giant's Causeway, a much larger, but similar formation in Northern Ireland
- Protected areas of Victoria
- List of national parks of Australia
