= Jacksons Creek biik wurrdha Regional Parklands =

Nature reserves in Victoria, Australia

Coordinates: 37°33′00″S 144°44′15″E

The Jacksons Creek biik wurrdha Regional Parklands (also known as biik wurrdha Regional Parklands) is a park system and series of nature reserves located in the northern outer area of Melbourne near Sunbury, in Victoria, Australia.

The parklands include over 1000 hectares connecting 26 kilometres of creek line from Sunbury to Diggers Rest and is being created for the protection of cultural values, environmental conservation, and recreation.

Jacksons Creek and its tributaries flow across the traditional lands of the Wurundjeri Woi-wurrung people and is known as ‘biik wurrdha’. meaning ‘land of many’ in Woi-wurrung language.

The Jacksons Creek bilk wurrdha Regional Parklands Plan was released in 2022 that sets out the management of the parklands. 30% of the parklands is currently in public ownership with the remaining 70% expected to be transferred by 2042.

== Traditional owners ==
The Wurundjeri Woi-wurrung people are represented by the Wurundjeri Woi-wurrung Cultural Heritage Aboriginal Corporation, which is the Registered Aboriginal Party representing the traditional owners of the biik wurrdha Regional Parklands.

The cultural landscape of the parklands is valued for spiritual, archaeological, historical, ecological and living connections that it provides to the Wurundjeri Woi-wurrung community. It is home to ceremonial sites, archaeological places (such as the Sunbury Earth Rings), places representing colonial settler arrivals and Woi-wurrung interactions and other important cultural features.

The biik wurrdha Cultural Values Study 2021 sets out the cultural landscape and demonstrates that biik wurrdha is understood by Wurundjeri Woi-wurrung people today as a cultural landscape of many interrelated elements. These include animals, plants, landforms, artefacts, cultural features, beliefs, stories, Ancestors, historical events and contemporary associations. biik wurrdha is also a place symbolic of colonisation, resistance, adaptation and self-determination.

The following quotes indicate the history and ongoing significance of the cultural landscape to the Wurundjeri Woi-wurrung people

Traditionally, biik wurrdha and its associated wetlands and billabongs are an essential element of Healthy Country in the Sunbury region. Wurundjeri Woi-wurrung traditional cultural knowledge indicates that, there, Woi-wurrung speaking people harvested food plants and resources (sedges, rushes, reeds, and water ribbons) and collected water from the waterholes.

The first colonial settlers of the Port Phillip District targeted the grasslands surrounding biik wurrdha for agriculture from 1835 onwards. The Marin balluk and Wurundjeri willam were immediately dispossessed of vital areas of Country. The four years between colonial settlement and the establishment of the Port Phillip Aboriginal Protectorate in 1839 saw a period of continual conflict between the colonial settlers and Traditional Custodians who attempted to assert their rights to Country.

Yet, Woi-wurrung speaking people were not passive agents. Disruption from settlers was met with resistance and destruction of their sheep at times. Some Woi-wurrung speaking people continued to maintain some rights to Country and cultural practices on the runs of ‘sympathetic’ settlers such as the Jackson brothers, after whom Jackson Creek (biik wurrdha) was named. Some Woi-wurrung speaking people created a system of transactional exchange with colonial settlers, exchanging labour or services for rations or money. These were all responses to the rapid speed with which colonial settlers hunted native animals and livestock ate local supplies of murnong, native grasses and other important food plants. However, Woi-wurrung speaking people were living in destitution and starvation by 1839–1840, experiencing the full force of frontier conflict and resorting to extreme measures to support their livelihoods.

The Wurundjeri Woi-wurrung representatives formed a view that their association with the biik wurrdha landscape is held within the artefacts and cultural features left by their Ancestors, their historical narrative, their spiritual fulfilment found on Country, the environment, and their understanding of traditional land-use. The biik wurrdha landscape is also a site of Wurundjeri Woi-wurrung peoples’ colonial accommodation, resistance and efforts for self-determination. These associations are represented in the cultural and geographic elements of the biik wurrdha landscape and are of equal importance.

For the Wurundjeri Woi-wurrung representatives, contemporary significance is sustained through continuing traditional customary practices in the modern day, and passing knowledge onto the next generation. For example, the Narrap Ranger team at WWCHAC continues to lead culturally appropriate land-management practices at the Sunbury Rings, including cultural burning. Restoring the environmental landscape and following culturally appropriate land management is understood as Caring for Country by Wurundjeri Woi-wurrung people, a reciprocal practice where one’s own wellbeing is linked to the wellbeing of Country and its biodiversity. Wurundjeri Woi-wurrung people hold the customary responsibilities in caring for this place to ensure seasonal maintenance of the right ecology, habitats for their Creation Ancestors and other culturally significant species, and restoration of their Ancestral landscape.

== History ==
The Wurundjeri Woi-wurrung people have inhabited traditional Woi-wurrung Country, including the land covering the parklands, for thousands of years.

=== 1835 – 1863, Encroachment of settlers on Wurundjeri Woi-wurrung Country ===
The year 1835 marked the encroachment of people with pastoral interests into Woi-wurrung Country, formalised by the Port Phillip Association’s limits of settlement. This immediately diminished Indigenous people’s access to their Country and resources. After 28 years of active colonial resistance on Country, the year 1863 marks the removal of the remaining Woi-wurrung people onto the Coranderrk Aboriginal Reserve in Healesville.

=== 1836, Emu Bottom ===
Emu Bottom was originally established as a stock run on a property settled by George Evans in 1836. Evans was in the party that first settled at Batmans Hill (later to become Melbourne) and was, later, a prominent figure in early Melbourne and the first settler at Sunbury. The sheep and cattle run was established in the earliest days of settlement in Victoria and Emu Bottom Homestead is the oldest surviving homestead in Victoria (Victorian Heritage Register Number H0274).

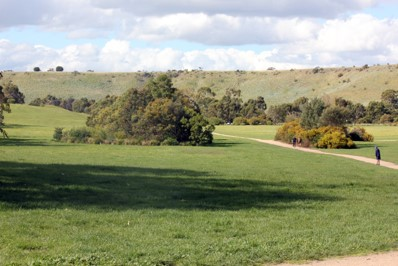
Emu Bottom Wetland Reserve and walking trail

In 1979, Emu Bottom was subdivided and as a result 100 hectares was handed over to the then Bulla Shire (now the City of Hume) to manage as public open space and for the protection of Jacksons Creek, now known as Emu Bottom Wetlands. Since 1994, the wetlands have been actively managed by the Friends of Emu Bottom Wetlands Reserve for conservation purposes.

=== 1861, Jacksons Creek rail bridge ===
Melbourne to Bendigo railway reached Sunbury in 1859. Jacksons Creek viaduct was on the second stage of the line, opened in July 1861.

=== 1864 - 1877, Volunteer Military Encampments ===
From 1864 to 1877, military units consisting of almost 2,500 volunteer military personnel would gather at Rupertswood to conduct their annual Easter encampment. The volunteers would conduct drill exercises, horsemanship displays and demonstrations of weapons in front of crowds of up to 15,000 spectators.

=== 1865, Caloola (former Sunbury Mental Hospital) ===
Caloola in Sunbury consists of buildings set in extensive grounds with plantings of mature trees and remnant farmland. Caloola commenced in 1864 as an Industrial School and was redeveloped in 1879 as a lunatic asylum, substantially enlarged in the period 1891 to 1914 and was maintained in use as a psychiatric hospital (1879-1968) and later a training centre for the intellectually disabled (1962-1992). Part of the site became a Victoria University campus from 1994 to 2011 and the remainder is in use by the Department of Education. Caloola is of historical, architectural, aesthetic, archaeological and social significance to the State of Victoria. (Victorian Heritage Register Number H0937)

=== 1870, Jacksons Creek Road Bridge, Macedon Street, Sunbury ===
The Bluestone Road Bridge over Jacksons Creek is of architectural significance as an exemplary example of a Victorian Stone bridge. The bridge is representative of bridges constructed during the 1860s and 1870s however the combination of narrowing piers, the rounded tops to the piers and the elliptical arches, results in a particularly elegant stone construction.

=== 1874, Rupertswood mansion ===
Rupertswood, built for Sir William Clarke at Sunbury in 1874-76, was one of the largest houses built in Victoria in the 19th century. The mansion is of architectural significance as an extraordinary example of a mansion built to reflect the wealth and prominence of the Clarke family and designed by George Brown in an eclectic design. Rupertswood is of aesthetic significance for the garden and parkland designed in the picturesque style by William Sangster in 1874.

=== 1882, The Ashes ===
On Christmas eve, the touring English cricket team defeated a local team in a social game of cricket at Rupertswood. One of the burnt bails was placed in a small urn and the ashes were presented to the English captain.

=== 1927 - today, Salesian College ===
The Salesian College has been located at the Rupertswood Mansion since it was established by the Salesian Society in 1927. The college originally included surrounding agricultural land to support agricultural studies and was home to its own Rupertswood Railway Station from 1962-2004. It continues to run its agricultural program within the parklands. The Eucharist Festival, a demonstration of belief in the Roman Catholic Church, was held by the Salesian congregation at Rupertswood. The festival, attended by over 30,000 people, was held annually for 50 years between 1931 and 1981.

=== 1972 - 1975, Sunbury Music Festival ===
“...the word ‘Sunbury’ became associated with the rock music festival hosted on a farm between Sunbury and Diggers Rest, and has been referred to as Australia's Woodstock.

== Geology ==
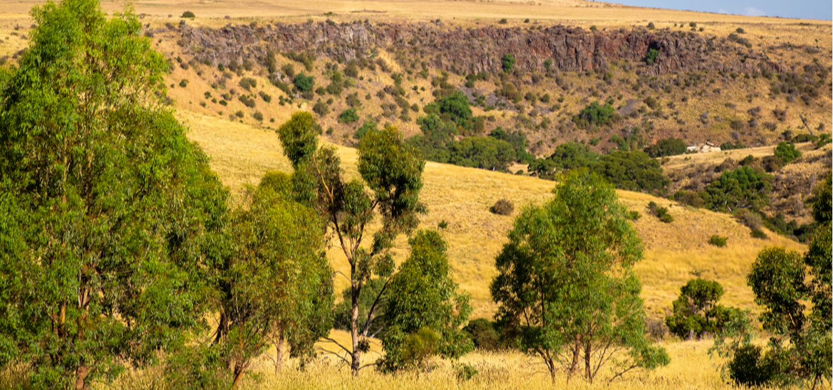
Redstone Hill escarpment

The biik wurrdha Jacksons Creek valley and its underlying geology frame the parklands and includes Jacksons Hill and Redstone Hill volcanic cones, rapids, steep escarpments and rocky outcrops formed by lava flows.

The area within the parklands is characterised by a surface geology of Pleistocene basalt on a plain bounded by Emu Creek and a small tributary of it to the east, and Jacksons Creek to the west. Jacksons Creek is part of the Maribyrnong River catchment and flows south to meet Deep Creek and eventually form the Maribyrnong River. Both are also characterised by generally narrow steep sided valleys with the occasional broad floodplain. The surface geology of these creek valleys usually comprises Holocene alluvium.

biik wurrdha formed when geological processes created a deep incision, or cutting, in the basalt plains. Earthquake, volcanic, mountain-building and stream activity accelerated these processes around 20,000 years ago. The resulting biik wurrdha valley sits around 50–90 m below the plains. The valley comprises deep gullies, creek flats, steep slopes (escarpments) and high plains or tablelands (plateaus).

The parklands includes the junction of Harpers Creek and Jacksons Creek. Harpers Creek enters the parklands from the west, flows around the southern edge of Jacksons Hill forming deeply incised areas before running into Jacksons Creek.

The Wurundjeri Woi-wurrung Cultural Values Study also details the importance of the parklands’ geology, in particular the presence of ochre within the creek corridor, a precious resource with cultural and spiritual value.

== Ecology ==
Much of the parklands since colonial settlement has been used for agricultural purposes however remnants of native vegetation remain in isolated patches across the area. During the early settlement of the Sunbury district, pastoralists grazed stock, particularly sheep, in the parklands area. Preparation of the land for farming practices would have included the clearance of native vegetation which would have comprised riparian woodland and open scrub with river red gums (Eucalyptus camadulensis) lining the creeks.

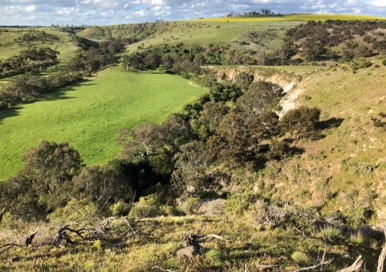
Holden Flora Reserve

Native vegetation has been largely replaced by weeds however some high value remnants still exist including important ecological vegetation classes within the Victorian Volcanic Plain Bioregion. Holden Flora Reserve is located within the parklands and was created in 1987 to preserve the geology, flora and fauna of the Keilor Plains. The reserve features remnant native grasslands, grassy woodlands and geological formations similar to those found at Organ Pipes National Park to the south. Holden Flora Reserve supports a high diversity of reptile fauna - some 25 species have been recorded, and one of the remaining three known populations of the endangered Grassland Earless Dragon in the State. Jacksons Creek running through the reserve offers an important habitat for the platypus, eastern water rat and Lesueur's frog.

The parklands play an important role as a wildlife corridor as surrounding areas are developed for residential housing and habitat area is reduced. The parkland areas along Jacksons Creek support a wide variety of species such as fish, frogs, platypus, and kangaroos, and supports a range of ecosystems.

Areas of the parklands are reserved for conservation and protection of Australia's Matters of National Environmental Significance. The conservation areas ensure the retention and enhancement of remnant nationally significant communities such as Grassy Eucalypt Woodlands and protection of Growling Grass Frog habitat

== Climate change ==
The parklands will be managed into the future to respond to climate change impacts and extreme weather event including storms, bushfires, and heat waves. In 2021, canopy covered 32% of the parklands.

== Key sites within the parklands ==
Key sites in Sunbury within the parklands include The Nook, Emu Bottom Wetlands, Skyline Drive Reserve, Apex Park, Jacksons Hill Reserve, Sunbury Music Festival Site, and Holden Flora Reserve.

== See also ==
- Kulin nation
- Jackson Creek (Victoria)
- Yarra River
- Sunbury earth rings
- Port Phillip
