= Sunbury earth rings =

Five indigenous ceremonial circular sites in Sunbury, Victoria, Australia

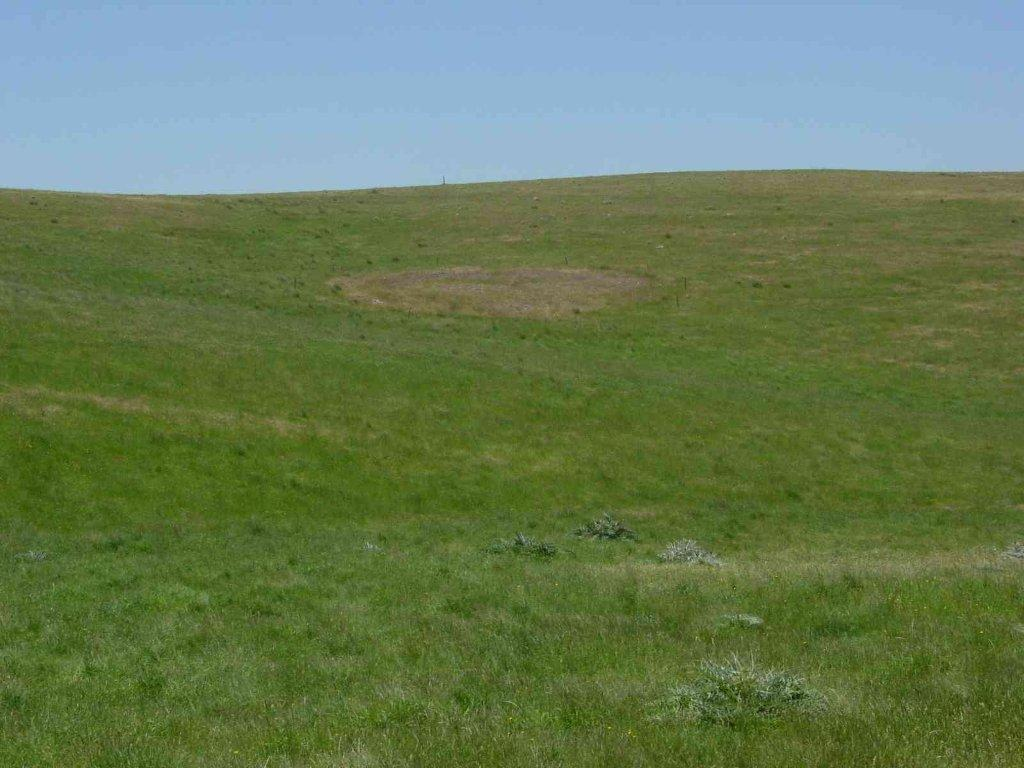
Riddell Road Earth Ring

The Sunbury Earth Rings are historic Aboriginal sites located on the hills to the west of Jacksons Creek near Sunbury, Victoria, Australia.

They are located on the Traditional Lands of the Wurundjeri Woi-wurrung people. The Wurundjeri Woi-wurrung Cultural Heritage Aboriginal Corporation (WWCHAC) is the Registered Aboriginal Party (RAP) appointed under the Aboriginal Heritage Act 2006, responsible for managing and protecting Aboriginal cultural heritage in an area of 708,934 hectares (1,751,810 acres).

The Sunbury Earth Rings are located within the Jacksons Creek biik wurrdha Regional Parklands and are viewable periodically by invitation of the WWCHAC.

Biik wurrdha means 'land of many' in Woi-wurrung language and is the Traditional Owners' name assigned for Jacksons Creek. It is understood by Wurundjeri Woi-wurrung people today as a cultural landscape of many interrelated elements.

== Description and identification ==
Aboriginal earth (or rock) rings in Australia are only known to occur in Queensland, New South Wales (NSW) and Victoria. It is estimated that over 400 rings once existed in NSW and Queensland, but only a quarter remain today. Many rings were destroyed following European colonisation, and land development, and those that do remain are vulnerable and fragile.

The Sunbury earth rings were formed by scraping off grass and topsoil, and piling it in a circular ridge around the outside. They measure between 10 to 25 metres (33 to 82 ft) in diameter. Three of the rings are in close proximity and two others several kilometres away. All are on gently sloping sites. They are somewhat different from the Bora Rings found in New South Wales and southeast Queensland, which tend to be located in hidden, flat sites, and in connected pairs.

The Sunbury Earth Rings first came to public attention, and first were investigated and described in the early 1970s, when archaeologist Dr. David Frankel undertook a test excavation on one of the rings to determine their origin. Excavations revealed the remains of two small stone cairns, one in the centre and one on the edge of the circle, and a number of sharp stone blades or knives, which may have been used in ritual scarification or circumcision ceremonies.

== Interpretation ==
Recent archaeological investigations reanalysed the stone artefacts and re-excavated one of Frankel's excavation trenches which crossed the earth mound on the outside of the Sunbury Ring G. Residue and use wear analysis showed that some of the tools may have been used for cutting animal skin, or possibly for ceremonial scarification. One tool had evidence for possible cutting of feathers. OSL dating of the soil layers forming the raised edge of the ring indicate it was made between 590 and 1,400 BP.

== Management and conservation ==
Some of the Rings were put under the management of the Wurundjeri Woi-wurrung Cultural Heritage Aboriginal Corporation and were included on the (now defunct) Register of the National Estate. Several of the Sunbury Earth Rings are located and protected within the Jacksons Creek biik wurrdha Regional Parklands and in other open space reserves.

There are ongoing pressures on the sites from development. As a result of housing development along Reservoir Road, one ring in Fullwood Drive is now encircled by the back fences of adjoining houses, while another is subject to residential subdivision plans which will also see it surrounded by roads. A past proposal even considered incorporating one of the rings in the middle of a traffic round-about. The Canterbury Hills housing estate has submitted plans for residential development around the Riddells Road ring. In a 2009 submission to a Victorian Legislative Council inquiry into the impact of a Victorian Government decision to change the Urban Growth Boundary, the Sunbury Maribyrnong Valley Green Wedge Defenders stated that the Aboriginal ring was a significant element of the threatened Bundanoon woodlands and grasslands, which was being encroached upon by housing.

== Gallery ==
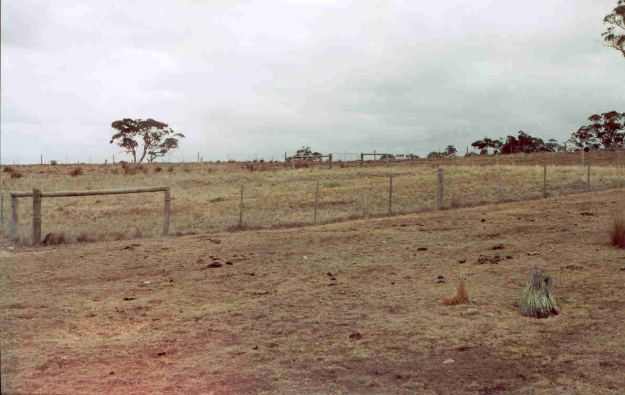
Correa Way ring

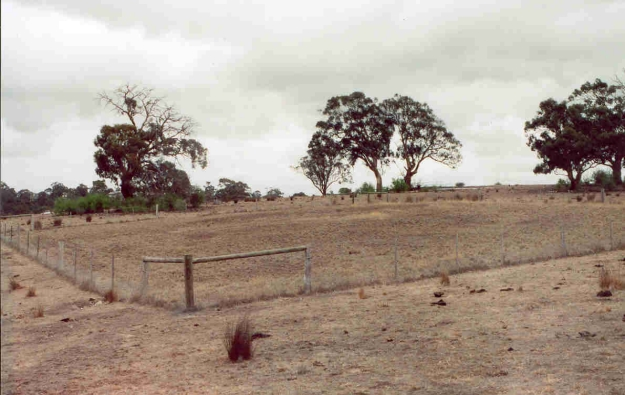
Hopbush Avenue ring

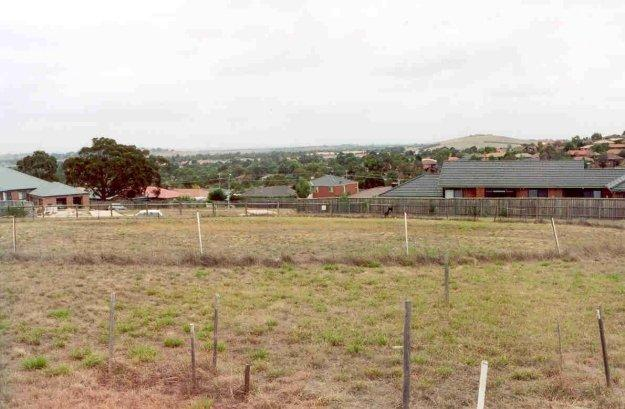
Reservoir Road ring

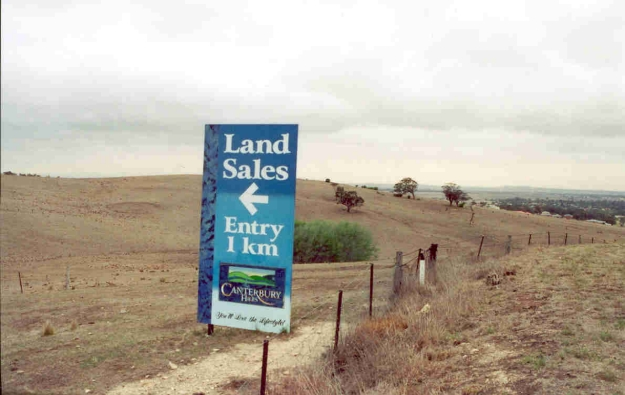
Riddells Road ring (on far left) with a sign indicating future residential development

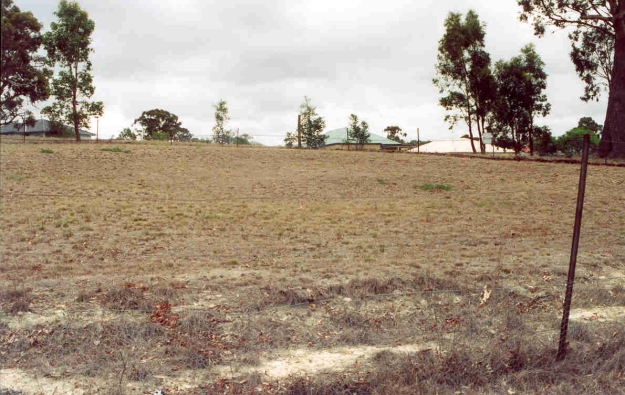
Wirilda Court ring

== Geographical location ==
- Correa Way – 37°33′46″S 144°44′22″E
- Hopbush Ave – 37°33′44″S 144°44′29″E
- Reservoir Road Ring – 37°34′10″S 144°41′53″E
- Riddells Road Ring – 37°33′12″S 144°42′11″E
- Wirilda Court – 37°33′52″S 144°44′08″E

== See also ==
- Aboriginal sites of Victoria
- Wurundjeri
