= Deep Creek (Melbourne) =

River in Melbourne. Victoria, Australia

Deep
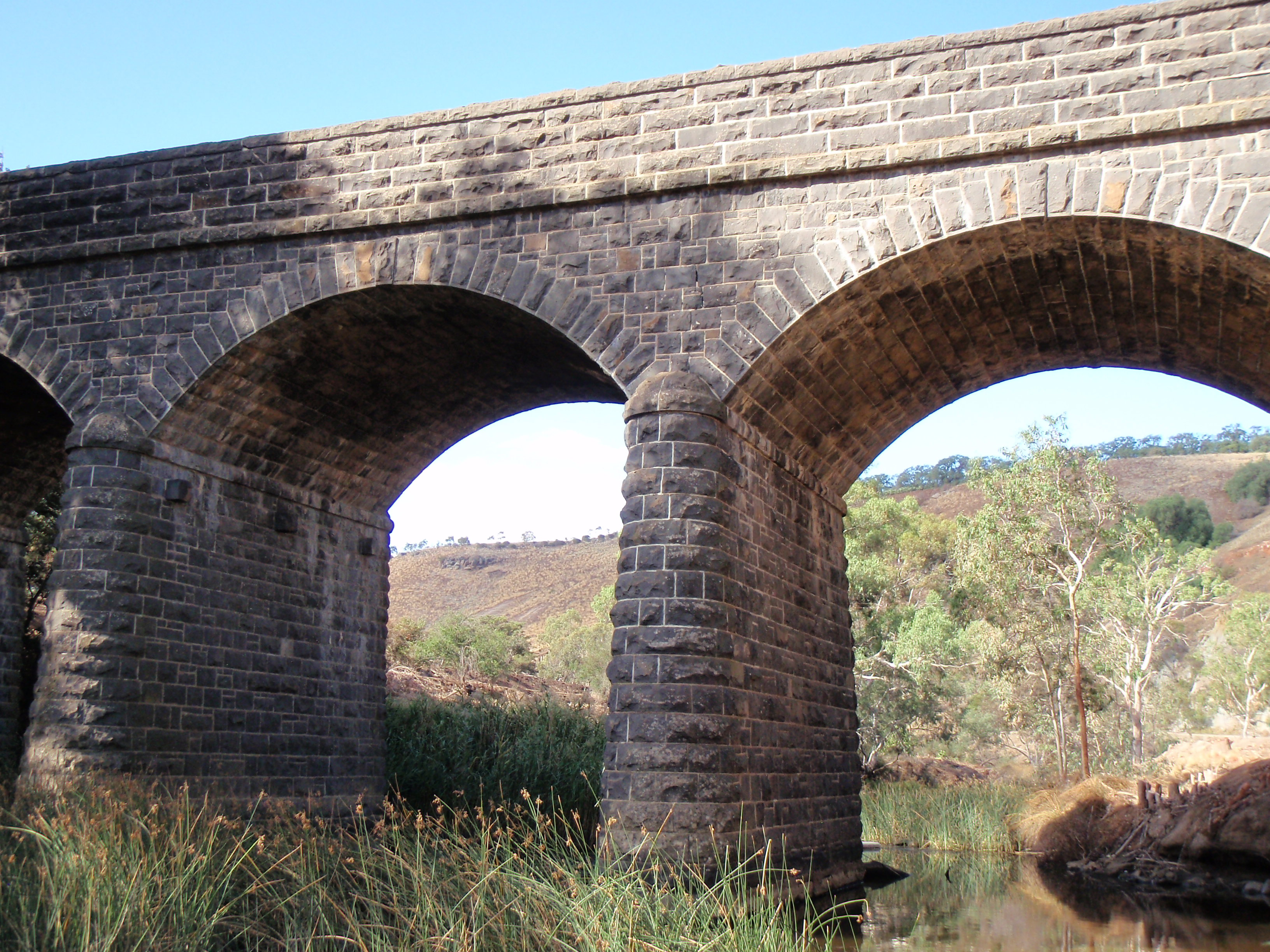
- Bridge over the Deep Creek at Bulla, built in 1869

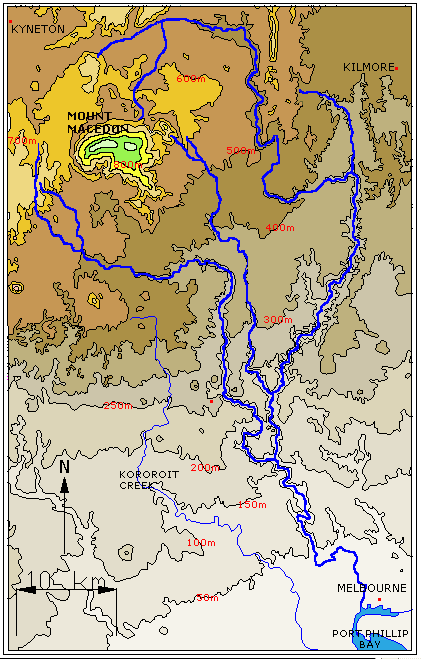
- Contour map of the Maribyrnong River basin; Deep Creek is the eastern tributary that rises on the northern slopes of Mount Macedon.

Location
- Country: Australia
- State: Victoria
- Region: Victorian Midlands (IBRA), Greater Melbourne
- Local government area: Macedon Ranges Shire, Hume, Brimbank

Physical characteristics
- Source: Macedon and Cowbaw ranges, Great Dividing Range
  - location: near Cobaw
  - coordinates: 37°16′30″S 144°35′58″E
  - elevation: 517 m (1,696 ft)
- Mouth: confluence with the Jackson Creek to form the Maribyrnong River
  - location: west of Melbourne Airport
  - coordinates: 37°40′10″S 144°48′16″E
  - elevation: 42 m (138 ft)
- Length: 128 km (80 mi)

Basin features
- River system: Port Phillip catchment
- Tributaries
  - left: Boyd Creek, Dry Creek, Garden Hut Creek, Long Gully Creek
  - right: Emu Creek, Konagaderra Creek, Monument Creek, Five Mile Creek

The Deep Creek is a watercourse of the Port Phillip catchment, in the outer north western suburbs of Melbourne, in the Australian state of Victoria.

== Location and features ==
Formed by the confluence of a number of smaller streams draining the north eastern slopes of the Macedon Ranges and the southern slopes of the Cobaw range, both ranges being constituent parts of the Great Dividing Range, the Deep Creek rises north of Mount Macedon, near Cobaw. The river flows generally east in a broad shallow valley, to the north of Lancefield, before turning generally southwards towards Penmore to enter the deeper, narrower valley that characterises the remainder of the watercourse. The creek then flows east again before resuming its southward course at Darraweit Guim, towards Bulla, joined by several minor tributaries. The Deep Creek reaches its confluence with the Jackson Creek near Bulla and together they form the Maribyrnong River. The deep and relatively narrow valley cut by the creek in its southward course through the surrounding basalt plains is particularly prominent at such localities as Darraweit Guim, Konagaderra and Bulla. The creek descends approximately 475 metres (1,558 ft) over its 128-kilometre (80 mi) course.

Unregulated by major dams or diversions, the water levels in the creek show great seasonal variation. Recently, Deep Creek flowed only seasonally along most of its length, although significant pools and stretches of water remain all year, some of which are local swimming holes.

== Etymology ==
The creek was originally considered to be the extension of the Maribyrnong River, and as such has also been known as Saltwater River (an original name for the Maribyrnong River) or alternatively the Upper Maribyrnong River, Maribyrnong Creek, Maribyrnong River East Branch or Maribyrnong River Left Branch. Another possible name for the river is Darraweit Guim, also the name of a small town located on the river. The name Deep Creek may refer to the deep valley the watercourse has cut through the plains north of Melbourne or the deep pools which have formed in the riverbed.

== Geography ==
The named tributaries of the river, ordered upstream, are:

- Jacksons Creek
- Emu Creek
- Konagaderra Creek
- Boyd Creek
- Five Mile Creek
- Long Gully Creek
- Dry Creek
- Monument Creek
- Garden Hut Creek

== Crossings ==
Named bridges and other significant crossing points along Deep Creek, ordered upstream, include but are not limited to:

- Bulla Bridge (current triple arch bluestone bridge built 1869, replacing an earlier timber bridge)
- Wildwood Rd
- Konagaderra Rd
- McCabes Bridge (Stockdale Rd)
- Darraweit Valley Rd
- Chintin Rd
- Gallaghers Ford (Joyces Rd)
- Dalys Bridge (Woodend – Wallan Rd)
- Sheehans Crossing bridge (Sheehans Rd)
- Forbes Bridge (Forbes Rd)
- Doggetts Bridge (Lancefield – Kilmore Rd)
- Musteys Bridge (Lancefield – Tooborac Rd)
- Linehans Bridge (Baynton Rd) (replaced by a low-level causeway during the 1990s, the old bridge is closed and derelict)
- Twin Bridges (Kyneton – Lancefield Rd)
- White Bridge (Whitebridge Rd)

== See also ==
- List of rivers in Australia
