= Climie =

Climie may refer to:

== People with the given name ==
- Climie Fisher, a UK pop duo formed by vocalist Simon Climie and keyboardist Rob Fisher

== People with the surname ==
- Jock Climie, Canadian CFL (Canadian Football League) player
- John Climie (1828–1916), Scottish-born Australian engineer
- Matt Climie (born 1983), Canadian ice hockey
- Simon Climie (born 1957), English songwriter/producer and the former lead singer of the UK duo Climie Fisher

== See also ==
- Clime
