= Darraweit Guim =

- Town
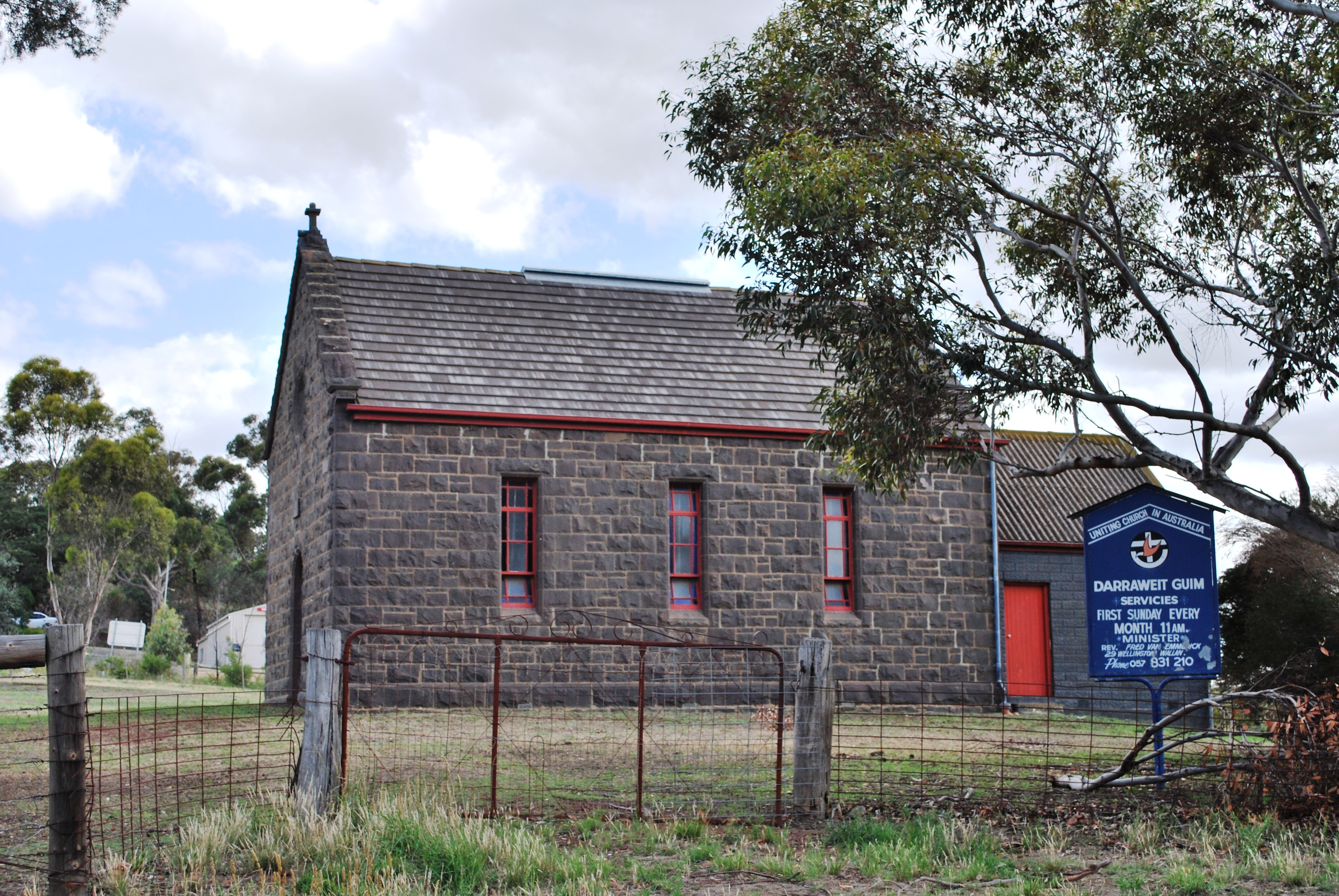
- Bluestone Uniting church

- Coordinates: 37°24′S 144°54′E
- Country: Australia
- State: Victoria
- LGA: Shire of Macedon Ranges
- Location: 53 km (33 mi) from Melbourne; 35 km (22 mi) from Sunbury; 13 km (8.1 mi) from Kilmore

Government
  - State electorate: Macedon
  - Federal division: McEwen
- Elevation: 306 m (1,004 ft)

Population
  - Total: 672 (2006 census)
- Postcode: 3756
Localities around Darraweit Guim
Romsey	Springfield	Wallan
Bolinda	Darraweit Guim	Beveridge
Clarkefield	Wildwood	Mickleham

Darraweit Guim /ˈdærəwiːt ˈɡwɪm/ is a Victorian locality, situated on Deep Creek, on the edge of the Shire of Macedon Ranges near the shire's boundary with the Shire of Mitchell. In 1992 the town had an approximate population of 300 with approximately 120 homes and a local school overseeing 51 students. Next to the school are the three local tennis courts which are regularly used. Up the hill is the Town Hall, Churches and CFA which protects the area. Platypus can be spotted in the local creek, and wombats also have burrows in the river banks.

== Naming ==
John Reid's history of the Shire of Romsey notes a possible etymology of Darraweit Guim, suggesting it means "where 3 creeks meet" in a local Aboriginal language. Another legend has it that "Darraweit' means the meeting and "Guim" means the turn which the course of the water makes in the township. Which legend is correct no one is sure, but according to the Postal Department record of Post Offices in the Commonwealth of Australia, it is the only one known by that name. The first survey of the district was made in 1851 by Surveyor Foote, who gave it the name of Darraweit Guim, which was approved by the authorities in Sydney.

== History ==
=== The Toll Bar ===
When early settlement was started, it was at the Toll Bar Corner, which is the junction of the present Old Broadmeadows road and the Darraweit Guim road. In the early 1860s, Mr and Mrs Francis conducted a general store there and also collected the toll at the Toll gates. This toll was a charge made on those using the road and went to the maintenance of the road. There was also a hotel or wine shanty conducted by the Cummins family, descendants of whom are still in the district. One of the "Toll Gates" from Toll Bar corner later hung for many years below Mr Geo. Wilson's house where his property opens on to the road to Darraweit Guim (Stennings Lane). What other places of interest existed at the Toll Bar Hill is difficult to ascertain, but we have heard of a blacksmith, and possibly there would be others who lived there.

It is believed that surplus butter from those living on the Deep Creek towards Darraweit Guim was carted to meet the transport wagons (either bullock or horse wagons) at the Toll Bar Corner for transport either to Melbourne or to the Goldfields in Bendigo. The early potatoes grown here were taken to the goldfields, north, rather than to Melbourne as today. In those days it was on the goldfields that the heavy concentration of population was to be found. The Stockdale family who settled at "Oakdale" in the 1850s and are still there, and they tell of produce going to the goldfields. Mrs Stockdale, snr was a Cummins of the Toll Bar, and the first of the family at "Oakdale" was born in 1858.

=== Township area ===
It would appear from the early parish plan that the township area was made available for selection in the year 1866, though some allotments were granted as early as 1864. Some of these earlier ones are the blocks opposite Chas. Coustley's and selected in the name of J. Crough, along with several lying to the north of them in the name of W. J. Lobb. J. Purves selected as early as 1864. As many of the blocks bear the date 18/5/1, 1866 it would appear that that date rated high in the selection calendar. The block where the store stands was granted to Cornelius Francis on that day, as were those between the then Wesleyan Church and then Presbyterian Church. Above the Presbyterian Church there were four blocks in the name of T. Shelley and one in the name of E. Maher, all allotted between 3/5/1 and 6/7/1, 1867.

=== Natural disasters ===
During the winter Deep Creek in Darraweit Guim is prone to the occasional flood and did so in 1906, 1916, 1934, 1964 and 1990, at its height reaching above the waist. Then in the summer the area was prone to bush fires and in 1904 & 1927 massive sections of the area were burned. Since those times technology and organisation skills have minimised the risks. Even so, in 1969 fires destroyed 12 homes. Both the town's churches and the town hall were also destroyed, and later rebuilt. In October 2022, Darraweit Guim experienced its highest flood peaking at 7.68 metres early in the morning of October 14 according to the Vic Emergency App. Darraweit Guim was the hardest hit town in Macedon Ranges Shire in the 2022 Victorian floods which washed out the main road and destroyed up to 15 homes as well as the historic primary school following an exceptional 82mm of rainfall and subsequent flooding of both creeks that converge in the township.

=== Post office ===
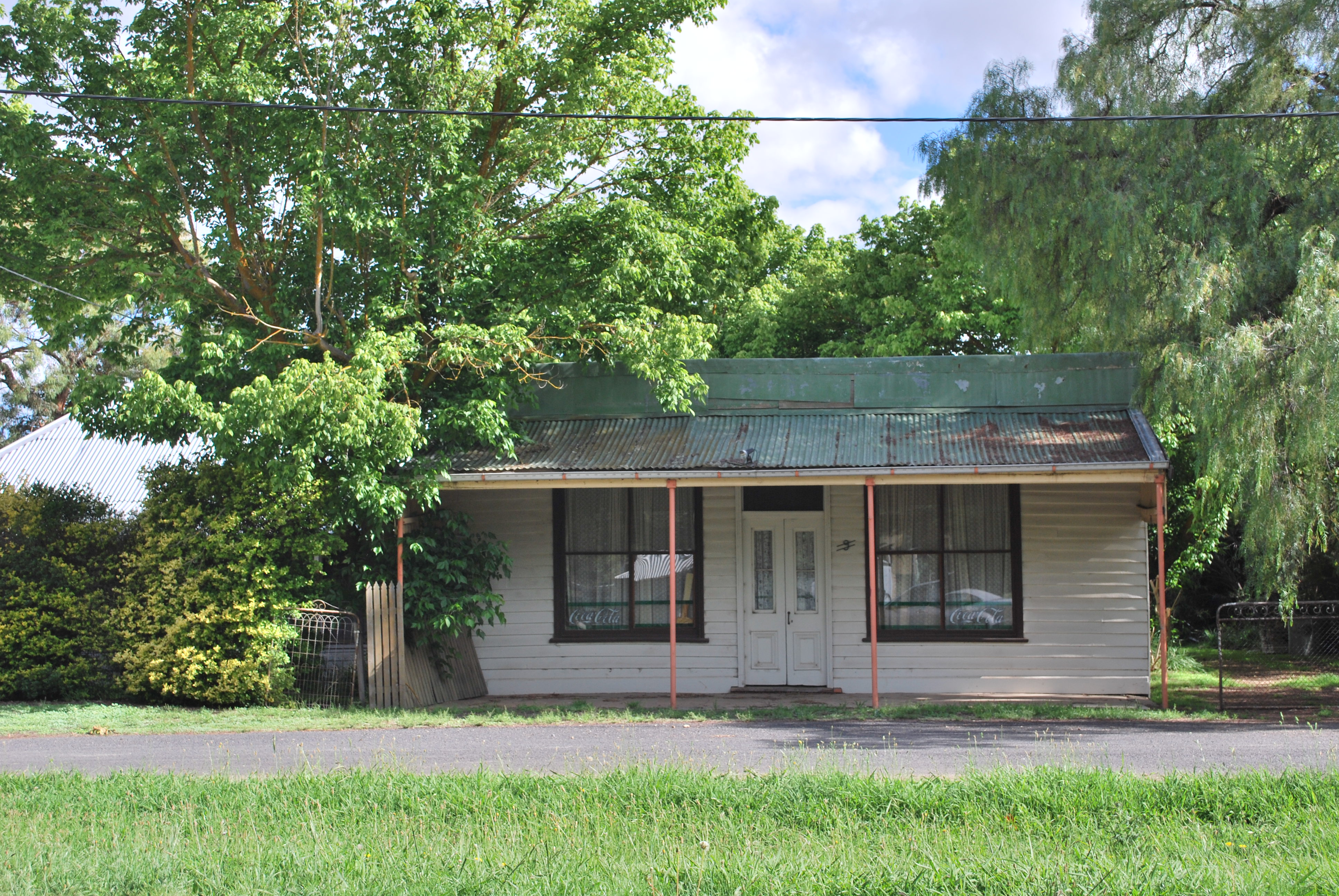
The general store, now closed

Wallan Wallan post office was opened in 1858 and serviced Darraweit Guim 6 times a week until the Darraweit Guim Office was opened in 1868 (closed 1976). It often shifted between households and continued until the mid-1950s when Wallan reclaimed the run. Rail to the area was surveyed in the 1880s but was never followed through with. The town's general store closed in the 1980s, reopened for a while in the 1990s by the Guy family. The current owners hoped to reopen it, but it is getting a bit dilapidated

=== Pioneering families ===
Anderton, Barry, Breen, Brown, Cleve, Coustley, Cummins, Delaney, Doheney, Elder, Francis, Howden, Lade, Lobb, Maher, McCabe, McDonald, McDonell, Moore, Stenning, Stockdale, Tom, Waitt, Wilson and Aungier.

== Notable residents ==
Australian rock band Stonefield (made up of four sisters, Amy, Hannah, Sarah, and Holly Findlay) are from Darraweit Guim.

== Resources ==
- Darraweit Guim P.S. 125th Anniversary Booklet: A Brief History of the School and District (1992, G. Taylor).
