= Jackson Creek (Victoria) =

River in Melbourne, Victoria, Australia

Jackson Saltwater River Western Branch, Gisborne Creek, Macedon River, Saltwater River, Saltwater Creek
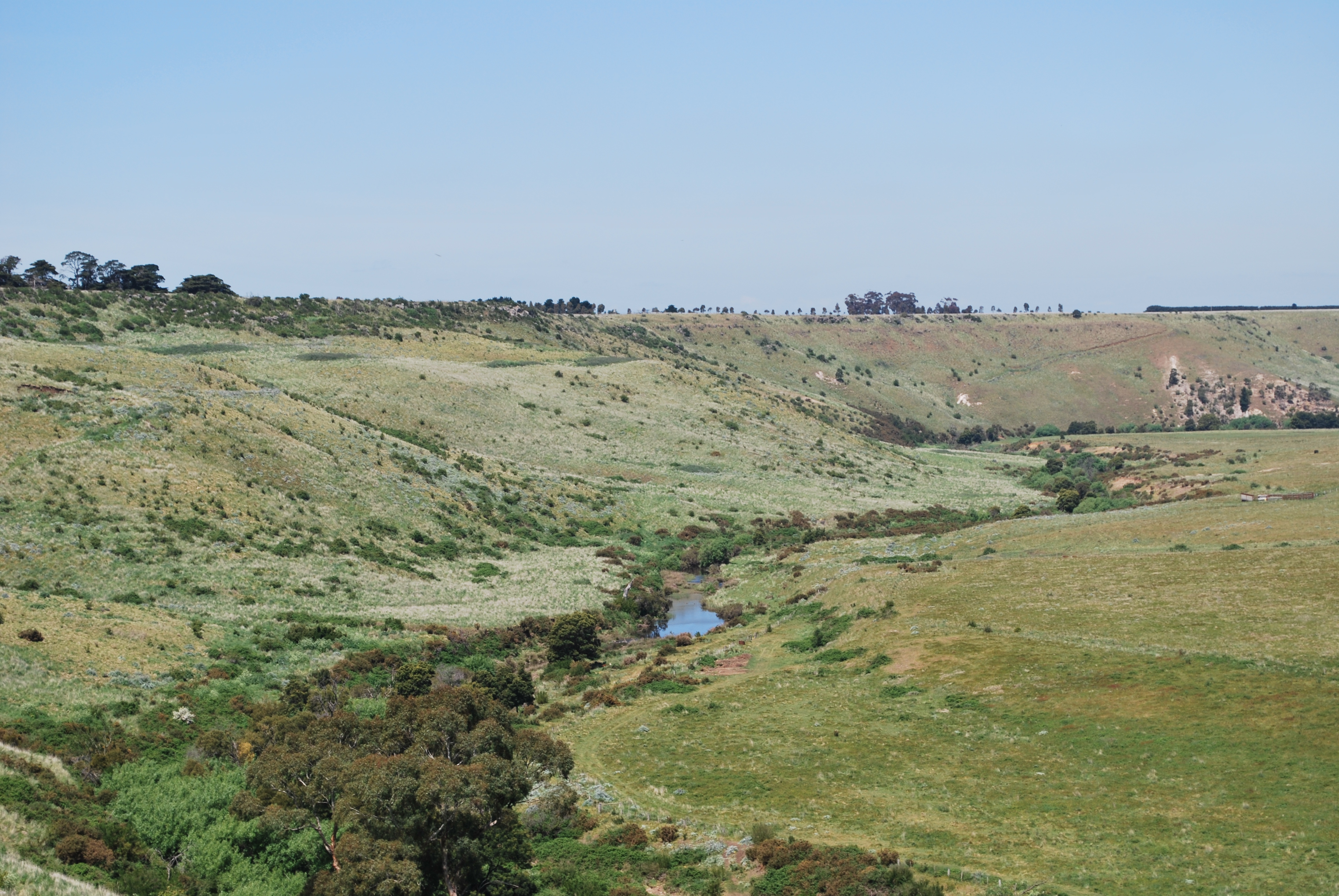
- The narrow valley cut by Jackson Creek near Clarkefield

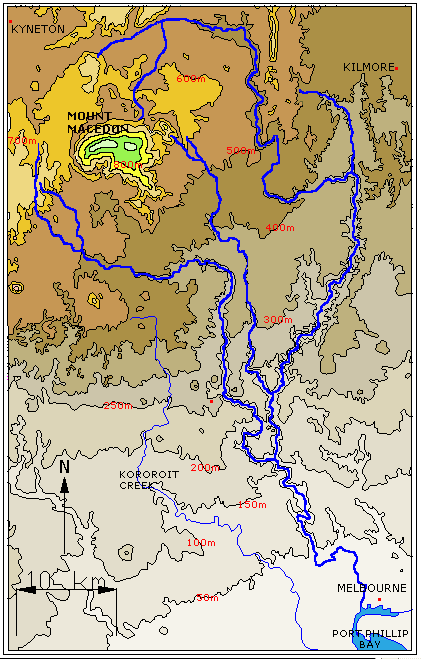
- Contour map of the Maribyrnong River basin; Jackson Creek rises midpoint between the 400–500-metre (1,300–1,600 ft) contour line.
- Etymology: After early Colonial settlers, 'Hungry' William Jackson

Location
- Country: Australia
- State: Victoria
- Region: Victorian Midlands (IBRA), Greater Melbourne
- Local government area: Macedon Ranges Shire
- Suburbs: Gisborne, Sunbury

Physical characteristics
- Source: Macedon Ranges, Great Dividing Range
- Source confluence: Distill, Gisborne and Slaty creeks
  - location: within Rosslynne Reservoir, northwest of Gisborne
  - coordinates: 37°28′9″S 144°34′4″E
  - elevation: 459 m (1,506 ft)
- Mouth: confluence with the Deep Creek to form the Maribyrnong River
  - location: west of Melbourne Airport
  - coordinates: 37°40′10″S 144°48′16″E
  - elevation: 42 m (138 ft)
- Length: 71 km (44 mi)

Basin features
- River system: Port Phillip catchment
- Tributaries
  - left: Riddells Creek
  - right: Longview Creek
- National park: Organ Pipes NP

The Jackson Creek (sometimes referred to as Jacksons Creek) is a watercourse within the Port Phillip catchment, in the outer northern suburbs of Melbourne, in the Australian state of Victoria.

== Location and features ==
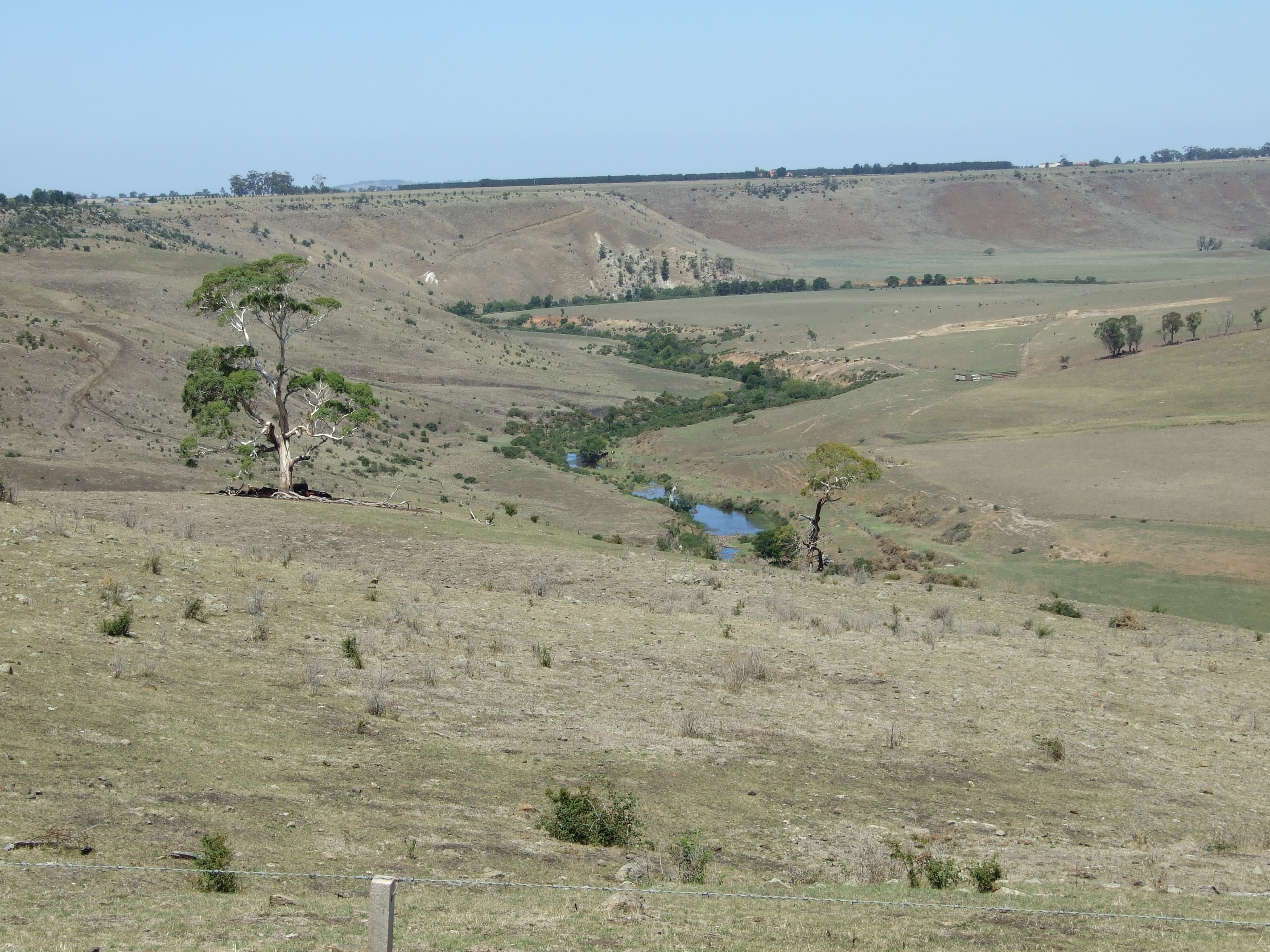
Jackson Creek, at Clarkefield

Formed by the confluence of the Distill, Gisborne and Slaty creeks that drain the southern parts of the Macedon Ranges, part of the Great Dividing Range through the Black Forest, the Jackson Creek rises northwest of Gisborne, within the Rosslynne Reservoir. The creek flows east, then south, then south by east, joined by two minor tributaries before reaching its confluence with the Deep Creek to form the Maribyrnong River west of Melbourne Airport. In its upper reaches the creek flows east in a broad shallow valley in the Bullengarook area, then enters the deeper, narrower valley that characterises the remainder of the watercourse. The creek flows through the town of Gisborne before turning generally southwards to flow through Sunbury eventually to join with Deep Creek south of Bulla, where the two waterways form the Maribyrnong River. The deep and relatively narrow valley cut by the creek in its southward course through the surrounding basalt plains is particularly prominent at such places as Emu Bottom and the Organ Pipes National Park. The creek descends 417 metres (1,368 ft) over its 71-kilometre (44 mi) course.

The incised meanders of the Jackson Creek demonstrate the downcutting of the Newer Volcanics and have formed rapids and small falls, along with outcrops of columnar basalts and tessellated pavements, for example at the Organ Pipes National Park near the Calder Freeway, a prominent display of basaltic columns so named because they look like organ pipes. Upstream, a bluestone flour mill near the falls south of Sunbury harnessed the major drop in river levels.

The Jacksons Creek biik wurrdha Regional Parklands are located on the creek.

== Etymology ==
The creek was named after the early Colonial settlers William Jackson and his brother, Samuel, who named the township of Sunbury after Sunbury-on-Thames, in Surrey, England when it was established in 1857.

By inference, as Deep Creek has been called the east branch of the Maribyrnong River, Jackson Creek could be considered the west branch. The creek has also historically been called Saltwater River Western Branch, Gisborne Creek, Macedon River, Saltwater River, and Saltwater Creek.

== Crossings ==
Named and other significant bridges and crossing points along Jackson Creek include:

- Holden Bridge (early concrete beam bridge replacing an earlier ford on Bulla - Diggers Rest Road)
- Jacksons Creek bridge (Sunbury, historic twin arch bluestone bridge, pedestrians only)
- Sunbury railway viaduct (constructed 1859 for Bendigo Rail Line)
- Black Hill Bridge (Settlement Road)
- Old Jacksons Creek Bridge (pedestrians only)
- Jacksons Creek Bridge (Riddell Road)
- Calder Freeway
- Gisborne - Kilmore Road
- Aitken Street
- Waterloo Flat Road

== See also ==
- List of rivers in Australia
- Yarra River
