= John and Phyllis Murphy =

Australian architects

John and Phyllis Murphy were architects in Australia. Phyllis was also known for her work with wallpaper design and restoration.

The Murphys completed a number of conservation projects through the National Trust (Victoria) in the 1960s and 1970s. Their most notable design work was created during the 1950s, some examples of which are in their home city, Melbourne, including the 1956 Olympic pool.

John Murphy died in 2004. Phyllis Murphy died in 2025

== Working life ==
John Murphy was born in 1920, son of the Melbourne architect Gordon Murphy. Phyllis née Slater, was born in 1924, the daughter of Arthur Slater. She was one of only two women who graduated as architects from the University of Melbourne in 1949, having topped her fourth year in 1948. Following the completion of their studies in architecture, the two collaborated and set up a private practice of their own, a year before they married in 1950. After the success of the 1956 Olympic pool design, with colleagues Kevin Borland, Peter McIntyre and engineer Bill Irwin, the couple's business turned to residential commissions, but soon grew to involve the design of commercial and school buildings. Of their early residential work, Phyllis Murphy has written; "we started our architectural practice when there were severe shortages of building materials, manpower and finance... Despite these restraints, the immediate post-war period was marked by optimism and resilience... The houses we designed were influenced by a... visit to Sweden where living spaces were small but the buildings had a simplicity that we found fresh and elegant."

Their houses, like those of Kevin Borland and others, were all "vivid and improvisatory in structure, coloration and materials. They spoke of austerity and limited means, lingering from the depression and the 1940s, and reasserted another Melbourne tendency, making big architectural gestures with limited finances and dimensions." Architect and friend Neil Clerehan has described their houses as modest, "but their version of contemporary design was elegant and timeless."

In the 1960s they became actively involved in the preservation of historic buildings, and foundation members and honorary architects for the National Trust of Australia. Of their conservation work, Phyllis Murphy has written; "This work is often thought to be dull and staid, but, though it may be hard to believe [now], it was exciting and almost experimental in the fifties. This was a new approach for Melbourne many years after such movements gained importance in the United States and Europe."

Their commercial work included buildings for Fintona Girls' School, Caulfield Grammar School, commercial buildings including a television station in Shepparton, and a number of works in collaboration with other Architects. Private residential, conservation and restoration work continued in the 1960s and 70s, including Emu Bottom Homestead and the Collins Street facade of the Block Arcade.

The Murphys were also active in the foundation of the Collins Street Defence Movement in the mid-1970s, with "a strategy to halt demolition of historic and low rise buildings in Melbourne's main street...It failed"

The couple worked together until retirement in 1982.

== Notable works ==
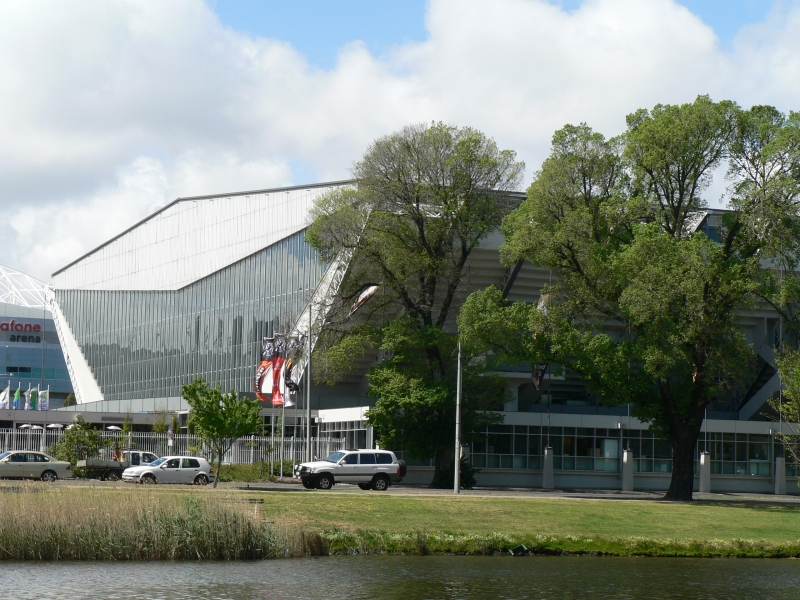
1956 Olympic Pool Melbourne.

1956 Olympic pool. Three years after establishing their practice, in 1952, John and Phyllis together with Peter McIntyre and Kevin Borland won the competition for the Melbourne Olympic Pool, which is considered one of Australia's finest modernist buildings. The pool was built to house the aquatic events for the 1956 Melbourne Olympics.

Bacchus Manor (restoration). Built by Captain Henry Bacchus at Bacchus Marsh, Victoria, circa 1838–1840, this imposing building looked "fit for little but demolition" by 1956. "The Victorian Housing Commission, needing land to build houses for Bacchus Marsh's growing population, began negotiating with [the owners] for the six acres on which the manor house stood." Local MP Vance Dickie matched the Housing Commission's offer and the long process of restoration began in 1959.

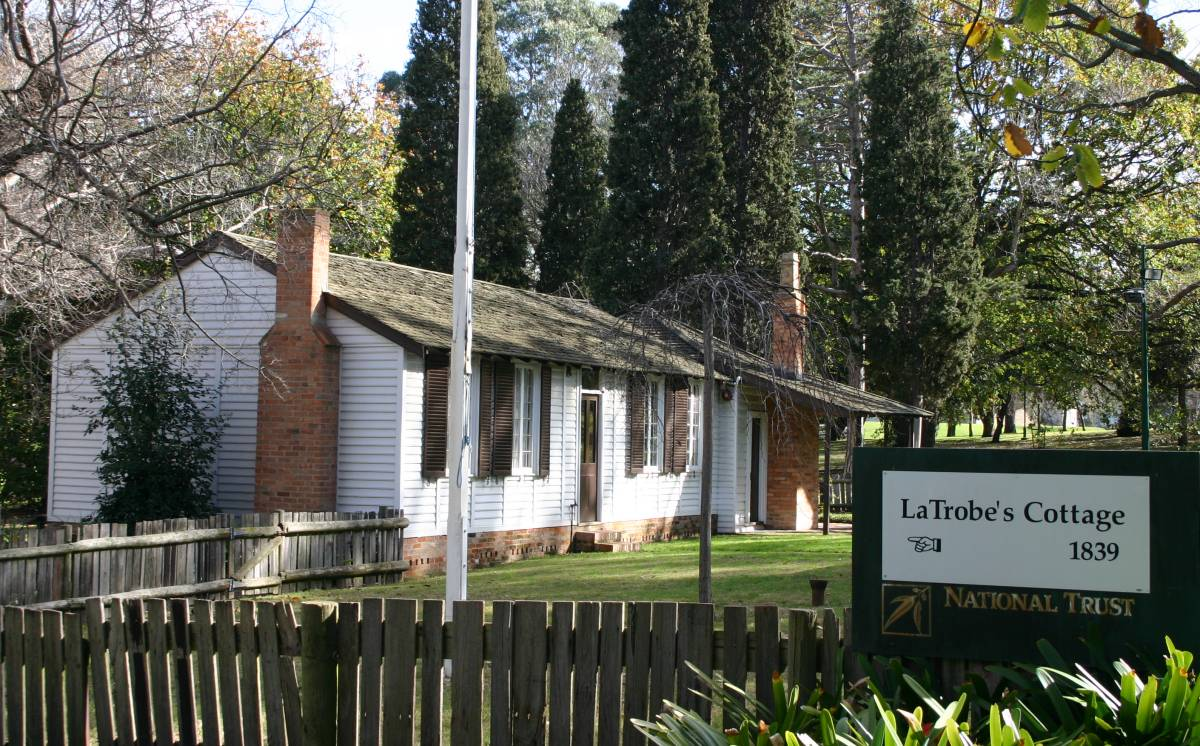
La Trobe's Cottage as currently restored.

La Trobe's Cottage (removal and restoration). The 1839 timber cottage, built for Port Phillip District's first superintendent Charles La Trobe was moved to its current location and restored in 1961–3.

Emu Bottom Homestead (restoration). The 1836 stone farmhouse and buildings near Sunbury, originally built for settler George Evans, were restored under the Murphy's guidance in the late 1960s and early 1970s.

Collingwood Town Hall (restoration). The Collingwood Town Hall, built in 1885-90 by George Johnson, had suffered severe deterioration in certain areas when in 1975 the Collingwood Council initiated a program of external restoration. "No particular effort of research was required…except locating on the old Hotham Town Hall in North Melbourne urns of pattern which were missing at Collingwood". John and Phyllis Murphy were appointed the primary consultants of the restoration project. One of the biggest problems they faced was the matching of the repaired and unrepaired surfaces to avoid patchy effect. Their reputation of being one of Melbourne's best practices for restoration didn't fail them, the Town Hall won an RAIA award for outstanding building renovation (in collaboration with Peter Lovell) after completion.

== Awards and competitions ==
- VASS prize, 1944 (Phyllis Murphy)
- Light in Architecture Competition, third prize, 1947 (John and Phyllis Murphy)
- Olympic Swimming Pool (Melbourne) Competition 1952 joint winners.
- RAIA Victorian Chapter Award (John and Phyllis Murphy)
- Merit Award for Outstanding Building Restoration, Collingwood Town Hall (John and Phyllis Murphy, in association with Peter Lovell), 1982
- RAIA Life Fellow, 2009 (Phyllis Murphy)
- Conferred as Doctor of Architecture, honoris causa, University of Melbourne, 2014 (Phyllis Murphy)
- Member of the Order of Australia, 2022 (Phyllis Murphy)
