= Tasmanian Main Line Company =

Private railway in Tasmania, Australia

Tasmanian Main Line Railway Company
- Map showing TMLR route

Overview
- Headquarters: Hobart, Tasmania
- Reporting mark: TMLR
- Locale: Tasmania, Australia
- Dates of operation: 1872–1890
- Predecessor: N/A
- Successor: Tasmanian Government Railways

Technical
- Track gauge: 3 ft 6 in (1,067 mm)

The Tasmanian Main Line Company (T.M.L.) was a privately owned railway company that existed in Tasmania from 1872 to 1890. The company were the first operators of rail services between Hobart and Launceston, where it connected with the Launceston and Western Railway (L.W.R.).

== Initial proposals ==
The idea of a railway linking Hobart with Launceston went back at least as far as 1855 when a move was put forward by a member of the State Upper House to put $2,000 aside in the estimates for a survey, which in turn led in 1856 to the Surveyor-General being asked to make a preliminary survey. Actual beginnings towards constructing a railway occurred in 1863, when Parliament allocated $10,000 for surveys of the route to the north. One proposed route by Messrs. Doyne, Major and Willett of the Launceston and Western Railway, was similar to the future line built by T.M.L. but had an easier grade, was twenty kilometres longer and would enter Hobart via Park Street instead of along the Derwent foreshore. Other routes suggested going through Green Ponds and Oatlands as more desirable, and another deviated to Antill Ponds, proceeded along the Macquarie and Isis Valleys to Longford thereby joining the L.W.R. to Launceston.

Until the construction of the L.W.R. in the north, Hobartians had been indifferent to the idea of a railway. Henceforth, they pressured the government to build their own railway line, some suggesting to Devonport, with a branch going to Launceston.

In 1868, a royal commission was set up to enquire into the cost of constructing a railway from the capital to Launceston. In respect of gauge, the commission concluded that "the requisite conditions of comfort, speed, construction and cost have been found to combine most perfectly in the 4 feet 8½ inches gauge".

Once the report of the royal commission was printed in the Hobart newspaper, The Mercury, no time was lost before money was voted by parliament for a proper survey to be made. Through the winter of 1869, the Railway and Progressive Association called public meetings and lobbied politicians. During August, The Mercury almost daily called for government action.

On 11 September 1869, the government announced that it proposed to ignore certain of the recommendations of the royal commission and parts of the Survey Engineers' Report. The government was ready to subsidise any company to the extent of £300,000. The Attorney-General introduced a bill into parliament to give effect to this proposition. After some hesitations, the bill passed all stages. It was now a question of negotiating with some company or firm of railway promoters. The necessary capital and professional skill was to be found in England. It was emphasised that the gauge was to be 5 feet 3 inches (1,600 millimetres) and that the railway was to be completed by the last day of 1874.

In May 1870, the government was advised that there was an English firm prepared to form a company which could operate with a capital of £1,000,000. What it required was a stronger guarantee from the government and suggested 6% on £850,000 for 30 years.

== Company formed ==
A considerable amount of offers and counter-offers ensued, and the promoters of the Tasmanian Main Line Railway Company initially perceived having a 5-foot-3-inch (1,600 mm) gauge such as that of the L.W.R., however the outcome being an acceptance between the T.M.L.R. and the Government to construct a railway of 3 feet 6 inches (1,070 mm) from Hobart to Evandale. British-born engineer John C. Climie was appointed engineer, having previously been engaged to assess the site of the Table Cape lighthouse, as well as the Emu Bay Railway in 1878, and designed several bridges in Victoria.

The railway was intended to run right into Launceston, but the Launceston and Western Railway had already built a broad gauge line along that route. It was agreed that a third rail would be laid within the broad gauge tracks. The Government guaranteed a return of 5 percent on A£650,000 for 30 years.

== Construction ==
There was an inauspicious start. Excessive rains during August and September 1872, held up surveying. Then it was found that the route originally proposed was "impracticable". Mr J.W Reeve, engineer and managing partner in Tasmania for the London contractors Clarke, Punchard & Reeve, arrived in Hobart in June 1872. Reeve and his engineering staff believed they could complete the railway, telegraph and all works by late 1874. In mid-1872, two 0-6-0T engines built by Fox and Walker of Bristol, arrived in Launceston on the barque Westbury. They were used by the contractors as construction engines.

On 3 January 1873, blasting had begun to create a cutting in the Hobart Domain. During the same month, the barques Fugitive and Araunah, operated by the T.B. Walker line, arrived in Launceston with a cargo of 610 tonnes of deep web rail. This type matched that of the L.W.R. These rails were stockpiled alongside the L.W.R. line ready for construction of a third rail between Launceston and Western Junction.

Inadequate passenger services from England saw the T.M.L.R. charter a ship from John Patton & Co of Liverpool. The Northfleet was a 955-ton ship and had been in service for twenty years. With 350 navvies on board, including some of their families, a total of 412 people, as well as 417 tonnes of railway equipment and rail, set sail from London. On 21 January 1873, the ship was anchored off of Dover, waiting for favourable winds. In clear conditions, a steam ship later identified as the Murillo, rammed the Northfleet and shattered the timbers of the hull. In the panic caused, the captain of the Northfleet fired his handgun, and some of the men on board forced their way into lifeboats ahead of women and children. The Murillo did not stop, and 300 perished as the Northfleet sank. Despite this, the contractors office in London was besieged daily by men anxious to leave and work in Tasmania.

By February 1873, 225 labourers had arrived in nine ships from England. Eventually 1,000 men would venture across to the island, not including local and interstate labourers. Local workers were paid 50c per hour, but many men from England deserted as the promise of 70c per hour did not materialise.

Construction proceeded until the link was made with the broad gauge Launceston and Western Railway at Evandale in March 1876.

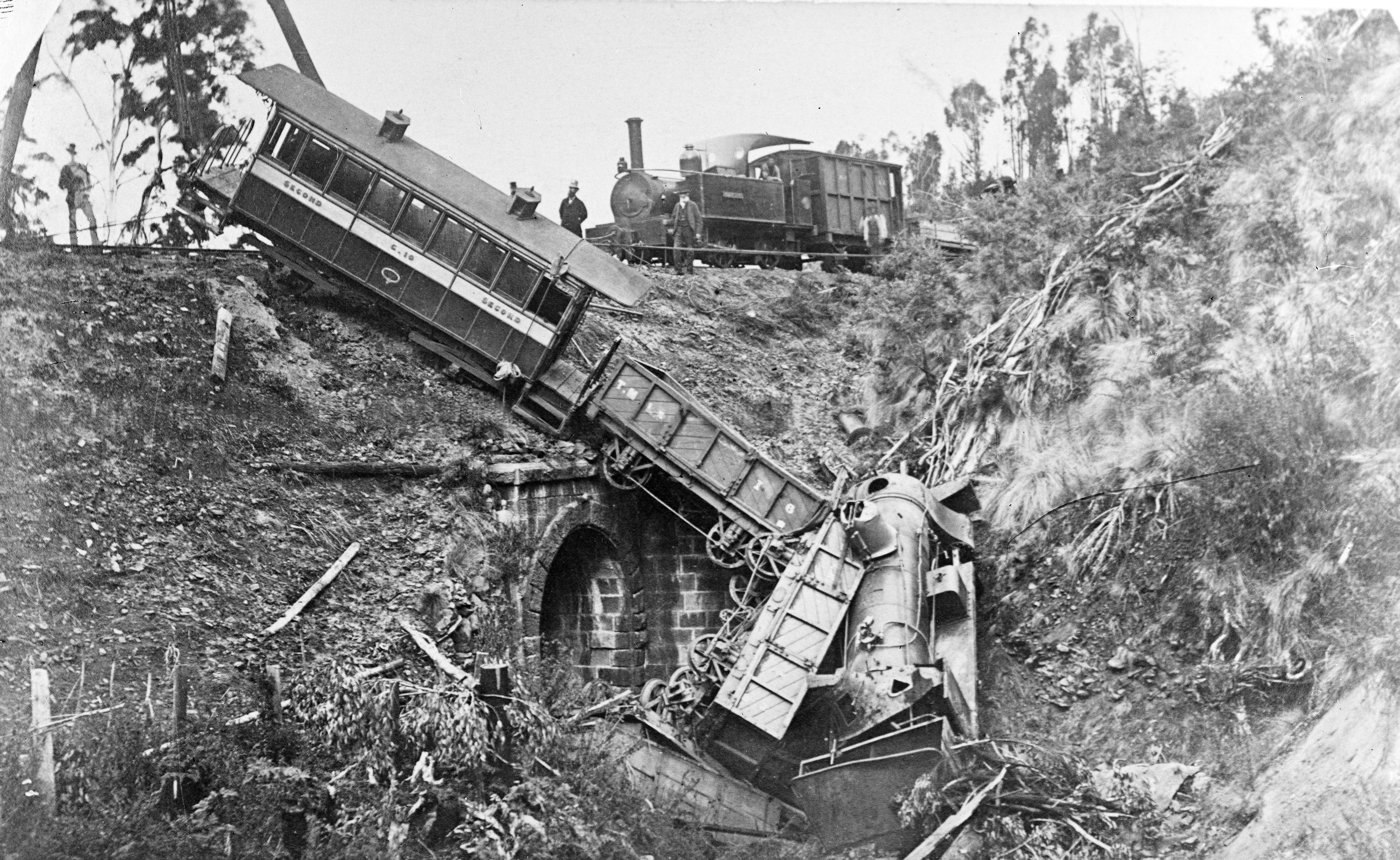
Accident on T.M.L. Railway at Coal Mine Bend between Colebrook and Rhyndaston on 24 April 1877

Connecting broad gauge trains operated into Launceston until the third rail was completed on 1 November 1876, enabling the Main Line Company's trains to run through. This arrangement was not without its difficulties as the Government, who now owned the Launceston and Western railway line, wanted to charge tolls and other rates for the use of its facilities. To clear the impasse, the Main Line Company built its own sheds at Launceston and laid the extra rail at its expense. The question of tolls remained unresolved for years, as did interpretations of the Act in regard to the obligations for other payments.

== Government purchase ==
Finally, on 1 October 1890, the Tasmanian Government bought the Tasmanian Main Line Company. Thus a long story of misunderstandings and mistrust was brought to an end. Neither side was blameless. The whole railway question had become entwined with the domestic strife of the Colony.
