= Bulla Bridge =

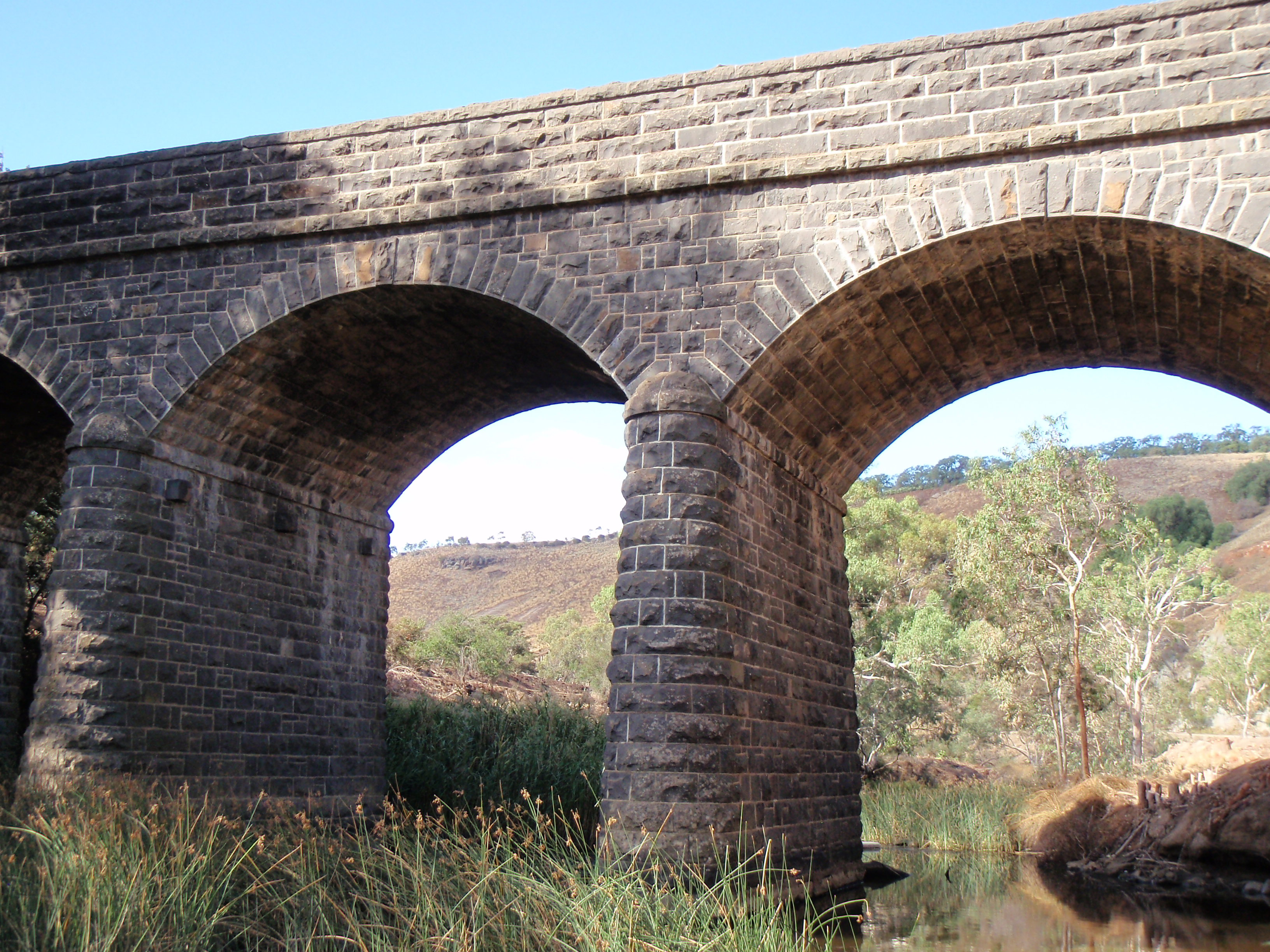
- Bulla Bridge
- Coordinates: 37.6312°S 144.8011°E

Characteristics
- Total length: 126 feet
- No. of spans: 4 (each of 27 feet)

History
- Designer: John C Climie
- Constructed by: McBurnie and Ramsden
- Opened: 1869

Bulla Bridge is a four span bluestone arched bridge over Deep Creek in the town of Bulla, north east of Melbourne. It was constructed in 1869 by McBurnie and Ramsden, for the Shire of Bulla to a design of Scottish-born engineer John C Climie and replaced a timber bridge built in about 1859. The bridge is 126 feet long and comprises four spans each of 27 feet. It is associated with a c.1843 road cutting and early ford which was on the main road to the Victorian gold fields.

The picturesque setting has attracted a number of artists and photographers including the woodcut by Eveline Winifred Syme in the 1930s, and numerous historic photographs.
