= Arthur Slater (footballer, born 1890) =

Australian rules footballer

Personal information
- Full name: Arthur Claud Slater
- Born: 17 August 1890; Williamstown, Victoria
- Died: 19 November 1972 (aged 82); Hawthorn, Victoria
- Original team: Hawthorn Juniors
- Height: 179 cm (5 ft 10 in)
- Weight: 80 kg (176 lb)

Playing career^{1}
Years	Club	Games (Goals)
1910	Essendon	1 (0)
1911	Melbourne	0 (0)
Total		1 (0)
- ^{1} Playing statistics correct to the end of 1911.

Arthur Claud Slater (17 August 1890 – 19 November 1972) was an Australian rules footballer who played with the Essendon Football Club. He was also listed with the Melbourne Football Club, but never played a game.

Born in Williamstown, Victoria, he was a clerk for the British Imperial Oil company, later to become Shell Oil Company, before joining the AIF in March 1915. He served at Gallipoli and on the Western Front, was wounded, promoted through the ranks and ended the war as a lieutenant. He rejoined Shell and by the 1930s he was the company's Australian Operations Manager.

He was the father of Professor "Harry" Henry Welton Slater and Melbourne architect Phyllis Slater.
