= Boyd Creek =

Stream in Washington, U.S.

Coordinates: 48°30′33″N 121°53′37″W

Boyd Creek is a stream in the U.S. state of Washington.

Boyd Creek was named after L. A. Boyd, a pioneer settler.

== See also ==
- List of rivers of Washington (state)
