= Syd Slater =

Australian rules footballer

Personal information
- Full name: Arthur John Slater
- Born: 16 December 1914
- Died: 8 March 1994 (aged 79)
- Original team: Gisborne (RDFL)
- Height: 183 cm (6 ft 0 in)
- Weight: 75 kg (165 lb)

Playing career^{1}
Years	Club	Games (Goals)
1935–1939	Essendon	33 (14)
1940–1945	North Melbourne	39 (27)
Total		72 (41)
- ^{1} Playing statistics correct to the end of 1945.

Arthur John "Syd" Slater QPM (16 December 1914 – 8 March 1994) was an Australian rules footballer who played with Essendon and North Melbourne in the Victorian Football League (VFL).

Slater came to the VFL from Gisborne, in the Riddell District Football League (RDFL). He started as a forward and kicked four goals on his Essendon debut in the opening round of the 1935 season, against Melbourne at the Melbourne Cricket Ground. The feat was overshadowed by teammate Ted Freyer who kicked 12 goals, a then club record. Despite the promising start up forward, Slater spent most of his time at Essendon in defence and as a follower. He won the best and fairest award for the Essendon seconds in 1938. From 1940 to 1945, Slater played for North Melbourne, then in 1946 crossed to Brunswick in the Victorian Football Association.

Outside of football, Slater worked for Victoria Police, rising to the rank of Superintendent. He was awarded the Queen's Police Medal in 1970.
