= John Climie =

- Born: 1828
- Died: 26 March 1916 (aged 87–88)
- Children: Frank Campbell Climie

John Campbell Climie (1828–26 March 1916) was a Scottish-born engineer who worked in Australia and New Zealand. He may have been working in Melbourne as early as 1856, when Austin, Climie & Co called for tenders for erecting a dwelling house for A. Grant at 193 Lonsdale St East, while he was resident in Caulfield near Melbourne by 1859.

His father was Mr. James Climie of Gouck House, Greenock, Scotland (1782 – 27 December 1871), and he had a sister Mrs. James Allison, and brother Daniel. among his children was son Frank Campbell Climie, who worked as surveyor beside him for many years before his premature death at age 47 in 1910.

He described himself as 'a surveyor who engaged in architectural work on occasion', and a 'Civil and Mining Engineer'. In Victoria he designed and supervised construction of the Darebin Creek Bridge on the Heidelberg Road in 1863–64 and prepared the design for the 1869 stone arch bridge over Deep Creek in Bulla, having won the £25 competition prize. The Inspector General of Roads and Bridges had recommended Climie's alternative design for an iron girder bridge on stone piers. At the time he won the Bulla competition he was working as part of 'Robertson and Climie, Architects and Civil Engineers', at 13 Bourke Street West.

He moved to Tasmania to take the position as Engineer for the Launceston to Hobart Railway, as well as the Emu Bay Railway in 1878. while other Tasmanian projects included the Table Cape lighthouse and the survey for the tramway from Strahan, Macquarie Harbour, to the Tin Mines at Mount Heemskirk. He also advertised for tenders for construction of several buildings, including a parsonage in Tasmania, and in 1870 (soon after the completion of the Bulla bridge), for a hotel and store at Sunbury for William Winter. In 1870 he had a Mr Snowball as partner.

His brother Daniel Climie, also an engineer, arrived in Melbourne as the Agent for Fairlie Locomotives, and lobbied and pamphleted for narrow gauge railways. Daniel moved to Tasmania and surveyed branch railway lines, assisted by his sons James and Henry. Daniel moved to New Zealand, where he was received with some suspicion, perhaps because he took a high-level position as city engineer for the town of Wellington from a local candidate. It appears that Mount Climie, New Zealand was surveyed and named by one of them. ( J. L. Climie, married Alice Price, eldest daughter of Mr H. G. Price, of the Lands and Surrey Department, Napier. A continuing link may be preserved in the current engineering firm of Climie & Co. in New Zealand. )

John Campbell Climie was appointed engineer to the Zeehan Town Board for a term of three years in August 1898, and continued his engineering practice for the local mines and tramways, living in Zeehan. He died on the morning of 26 March 1916 aged 88, after having been admitted to the hospital a week earlier.
