= Emu Bottom Homestead =

Historic homestead in Victoria, Australia

Coordinates: 37°32′26″S 144°43′58″E

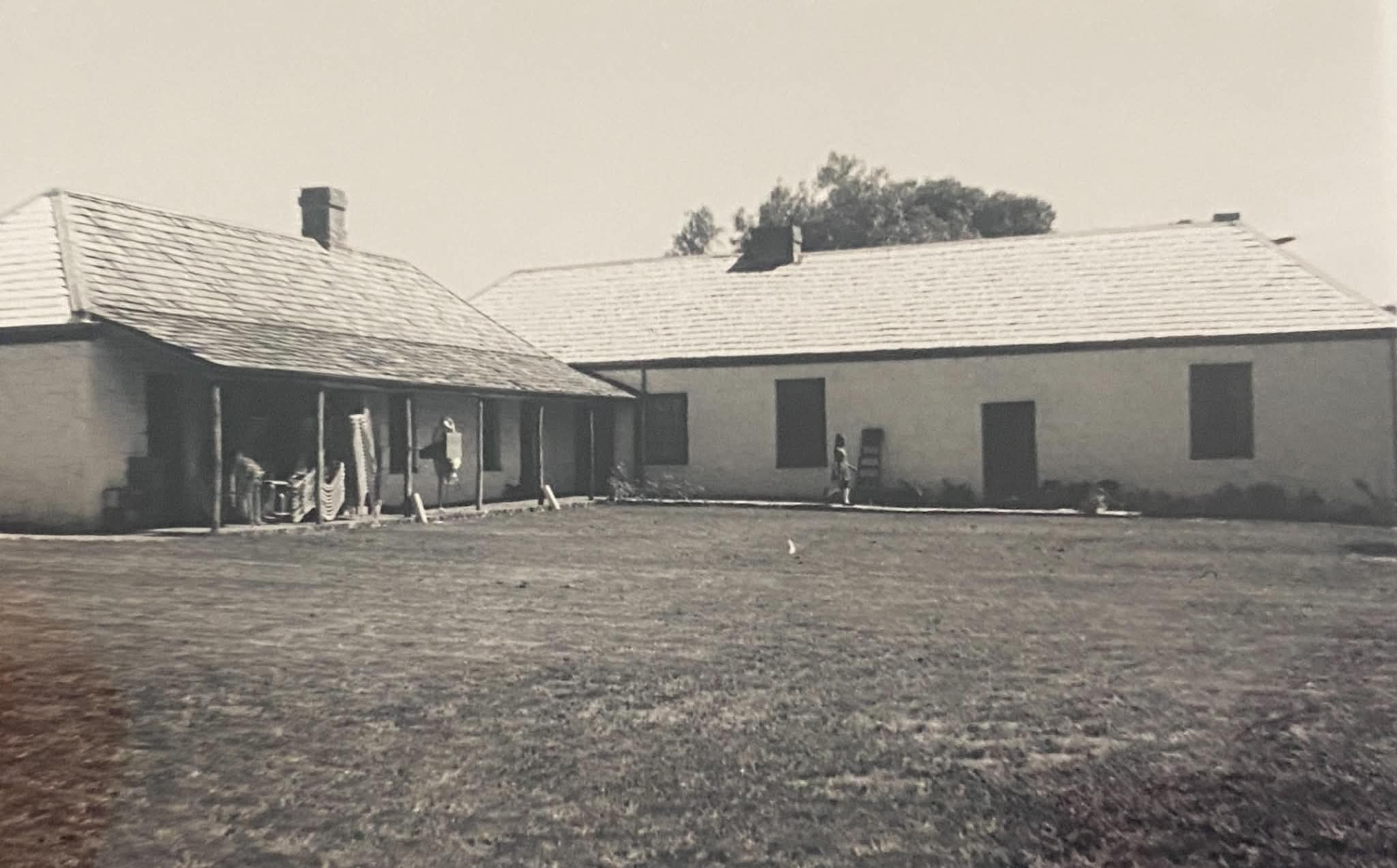
Emu Bottom Homestead c1972

Emu Bottom Homestead is a historic homestead near Sunbury, Victoria, Australia. Built c. 1836, Emu Bottom is Victoria's oldest Homestead, constructed by settlers in Victoria. It was so named because "it was low lying ground and the haunt of numerous emus." The main homestead and some of its outlying buildings were constructed from "local stone, dry coursed with creek mud."

Emu Bottom is also a rare example of early Australian colonial architecture, with its "twelve paned deeply recessed windows ... recalling the old world ... while the homestead (was) also intelligently adapted to the new environment" with its wide verandas and easterly aspect.

== History ==
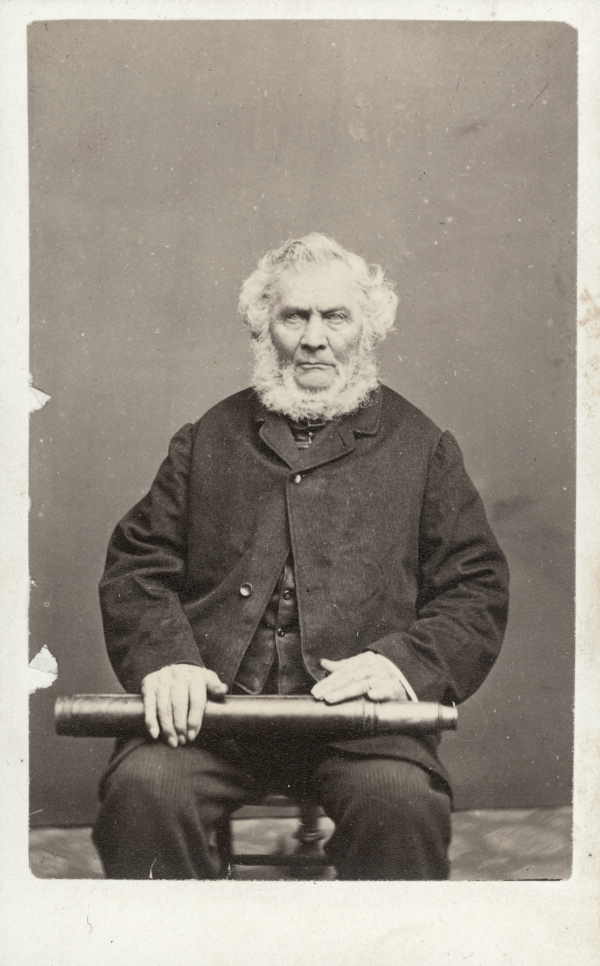
George Evans, c. 1860s

The building of Emu Bottom homestead commenced circa 1836. George Evans (1785–1876), who had arrived on the Schooner Enterprize from Van Diemen’s Land in 1835, settled near modern-day Sunbury. Emu Bottom, later called Emu Vale, was occupied by Evans, by squatting licence, as one of many large squatting runs on Crown land. In 1843, Evans, aged 58, married eighteen-year-old Anne Holden. Six children were born from the union and grew up at the homestead. After 1851, many squatting runs, including Emu Bottom, became available for outright purchase. To Evans' dismay, "his" run was purchased by the immensely wealthy W. J. T.“Big” Clarke. The homestead block of 640 acres (2.6 km^{2}) stayed with Evans, but this was hardly viable. In about 1860, Evans leased the property and moved to operate a hotel in central Melbourne. He died in Melbourne in 1876, but his family eventually returned to Emu Bottom. In 1916 the last of Evans’ son’s died and the property passed through several owners, being renamed "Holly Green."

== Restoration and revival ==
In 1968 under the direction of architects John and Phyllis Murphy, expert and painstaking restoration was carried out; the additions of the previous hundred years …were unmade." During restoration, several discoveries were made including the original kitchen fireplace and oven, as well as some artefacts. Some further restoration took place after a fire in 1980.

Emu Bottom operated as a tourist attraction between 1970 and 1975, attracting 90,000 visitors a year. The TV series Cash and Company and sequel Tandarra were filmed on the property in 1974-5. The TV mini-series Against the Wind was filmed on the property in 1978.

As the city of Sunbury grew closer, pressure on the small 600-acre (2.4 km^{2}) farm increased. In 1979 the farm was subdivided, with 24 hectares being preserved for the historic homestead.

Today the homestead and surrounds are managed by Emu Bottom Events as a function & reception centre. An important wetlands nearby has several platypus viewing platforms.
