= Studd =

Studd is a family surname and may refer to:

== The cricketing and missionary Studds ==
The Studd family were a wealthy Victorian English family, who made their fortune in indigo production in India, and produced a number of outstanding cricketers, missionaries and two Lord Mayors of London. The following are all directly related:

- Arthur Haythorne Studd (1863–1919) – fourth son of Edward Studd and his second wife Dorothy (née Thomas). MCC cricketer.
- Charles Studd (Charles Thomas 'CT') – third son of Edward and Dorothy, born 2 December 1860 Spretton, Northamptonshire, and died 16 July 1931 Ibambi, Congo, both an England cricketer and missionary in China, India and Belgian Congo, and founder of WEC International.
- Dora Sophia Bradshaw née Studd (1867–1959) – wife of William Graham Bradshaw, and only daughter of Edward Studd and his second wife Dorothy.
- Edward John Charles Studd (1849–1909) – oldest son of Edward Studd and his first wife Margaret Hudson; an MCC cricketer.
- Edward Studd (born Bombay, India 1819 died Kensington, London 1877) – son of Capt Edward Studd and Henrietta Anne née Murphy; an indigo manufacturer and a convert to Christianity through Dwight L. Moody.
- Emily Adeline Studd (born West Bengal, India 1852) – youngest child of Edward Studd and his first wife Margaret Hudson.
- George Studd ('GB') (1859–1945) – second son of Edward and Dorothy, England cricketer and missionary.
- Henrietta Margaret (1847–1924) – wife of Charles A Crane, and oldest child of Edward Studd and his first wife Margaret Hudson.
- Henry Malden Studd (1851–1920) – second son of Edward Studd and his first wife Margaret Hudson.
- Herbert William Studd (1870–1947) – Middlesex, Marylebone Cricket Club and Hampshire cricketer, and army officer.
- Kynaston Studd (John Edward Kynaston 'JEK') (1858–1944) – the eldest brother, cricketer and Lord Mayor of London.
- Peter Malden Studd (1916–2003) – cricketer and Lord Mayor of London.
- Priscilla Studd (1864–1920) – Priscilla Livingstone née Stewart, wife of Charles Studd, CIM missionary in China and India.
- Reginald Augustus Studd (1873–1948), sixth son and youngest child of Edward Studd and Dorothy, MCC, Cambridge University and Hampshire cricketer.

The three eldest sons of Edward Studd and his second wife Dorothy – JEK, CT and GB – became known in cricket at the Studd brothers.

== Other people with the surname ==
- Big John Studd (1948–1995), American professional wrestler
- Ron Studd, stage name of American professional wrestler Ron Reis (b. 1970)
- Scott Studd, stage name of American professional wrestler Scott Antol (born 1971)
- The Diamond Studd, stage name of American professional wrestler Scott Hall (born 1958)
- Will Studd, British-born international cheese specialist residing in Australia, host of the television series Cheese Slices

== See also ==
- Studds (disambiguation)
- The Studd Trophy, a British annual athletics award
