= Arthur Studd =

English cricketer, painter and art collector

Personal information
- Full name: Arthur Haythorne Studd
- Born: 19 November 1863; Billesdon, Leicestershire, England
- Died: 26 January 1919 (aged 55); Marylebone, London, England
- Batting: Right-handed
- Bowling: Right-arm slow
- Relatives: Charles Studd (brother); Edward Studd (brother); George Studd (brother); Herbert Studd (brother); Kynaston Studd (brother); Reginald Studd (brother); Peter Studd (great-nephew)

Domestic team information
- Years: Team
- 1887–1888: MCC

Career statistics
Competition	First-class
Matches	5
Runs scored	104
Batting average	13.00
100s/50s	0/0
Top score	47
Balls bowled	36
Wickets	0
Bowling average	–
5 wickets in innings	–
10 wickets in match	–
Best bowling	–
Catches/stumpings	4/–
- Source: Cricinfo, 11 September 2020

Arthur Haythorne Studd (19 November 1863 – 26 January 1919) was an English first-class cricketer, painter and art collector.

The son of Edward Studd and his second wife, Dorothy, he was born in November 1863 at Billesdon, Leicestershire. He was educated at Eton College, before going up to King's College, Cambridge. Although he did not play first-class cricket for Cambridge University Cricket Club, he did play for A. J. Webbe's personal XI against Cambridge University in 1885. He graduated from Cambridge in 1888, having played three first-class matches for the Marylebone Cricket Club during his final year, in addition to making a fourth appearance for the MCC in 1888. In five first-class matches, Studd scored 104 runs with a high score of 47. He played minor matches for Hampshire in 1888, then considered a second-class county.

Studd's main interest was art and he studied in Paris in at the Académie Julian in 1888–89. He met and befriended Paul Gauguin in 1890 and in 1892 he met the artist James McNeill Whistler, with the two becoming neighbours in 1894 when they moved to Chelsea, London. He travelled with Gauguin to Papeete in Tahiti in 1897–98. He later acquired a number of Whistler's works, leaving them to the Tate Gallery. Studd himself exhibited his own art regularly in the first decade of the 1900s, with some his works also held by the Tate Gallery. Studd's brothers, known colloquially as the Studd brothers, all played first-class cricket. Studd died at Marylebone in January 1919.

== See also ==
- Studd brothers
