= Edward Studd =

Edward Studd can refer to:

- Edward Studd (cricketer, born 1849) (1849-1909), English cricketer
- Edward Studd (cricketer, born 1878) (1878-1851), English cricketer
