= Peter Malden Studd =

Lord Mayor of London

Sir Peter Malden Studd GBE KCVO DL

Lord Mayor of London
- In office 1970–1971
- Preceded by: Sir Ian Frank Bowater
- Succeeded by: Sir Edward Howard, 2nd Baronet

Sir Peter Malden Studd (15 September 1916 – 22 June 2003) was an English cricketer and the 643rd Lord Mayor of London.

== Biography ==
Peter Malden Studd was born 15 September 1916. Studd's father, Brigadier Malden A. Studd DSO MC, was ADC to King George VI during the early part of World War II.

Sir Peter Studd was the Lord Mayor of the City of London between 1970–1971 and an executive of De La Rue, the banknote printing company; as a young man he was an outstanding cricketer, captaining both the Harrow and Cambridge teams. He played 28 first-class matches.

During his mayoralty was the re-opening of the transplanted London Bridge at Lake Havasu City, Arizona. The old bridge, which dated from 1831, had been sold by the City authorities for £1,025,000, and shipped to America to become the centrepiece of a new community. As Alderman Sheriff of the City of London in 1967, Studd and his wife attended the laying of the foundation stone and in October 1970 he returned in full regalia to join the state governor in an opening ceremony which featured a Lord Mayor's procession.

Studd was a great nephew of the famous Studd brothers who all captained Cambridge at Cricket. One of the brothers, Kynaston was also Lord Mayor of London. Like his forebear Sir Kynaston Studd, he was a governor of the Regent Street Polytechnic (now part of the University of Westminster).

Between 1973 and 1974 Studd was also a master of the Merchant Taylors' Company, thus maintaining another long-standing Studd family connection. An equally long-standing family connection was English Freemasonry, and Peter Studd was an active member of the organisation, and a Past Master of the Lodge of Assistance No 2773 (London, England).

== Positions and honours ==
Amongst his other positions were:

- Chairman of the Florence Nightingale Hospital
- President of the British Chiropractic Advancement Association
- Vice-president of the Arts Educational Schools
- Governor of Harrow
- Chairman of King George's Jubilee Trust
- Part-time member of the London Electricity Board 1973-77

Studd was knighted in 1969 and advanced to GBE in 1971. He was appointed KCVO in 1979 in recognition of his work for the Prince's Trust, and became a Deputy Lieutenant for Wiltshire in 1983.

== Legacy ==
It was Studd's hope that he might be remembered for his work as leader of the campaign to save the structure of St Paul's Cathedral.

The roof and fabric of the building had suffered from the ravages of time and the constant vibration from the London traffic. During his mayoralty he was able to help raise £3 million towards the project and for him was a highlight of his year of office. His fundraising efforts were impressive and he was even able to persuade President Richard Nixon to be the project's patron in America. As a result, money flooded in, including one donation of $10 from an American pensioner who had visited the cathedral during the First World War in 1917.

Her Majesty, Queen Elizabeth, The Queen Mother attended the celebrations at Mansion House which were held as a tribute to Sir Peter just before he left office.

== Studd family and related articles ==
- The Studd Brothers
- Charles Studd
- Sir Kynaston Studd
- George Studd
- Priscilla Studd

== Cricketing records ==
- Cricket records of PM Studd
