= Judith Fletcher =

Australian photographer (1886–1970)

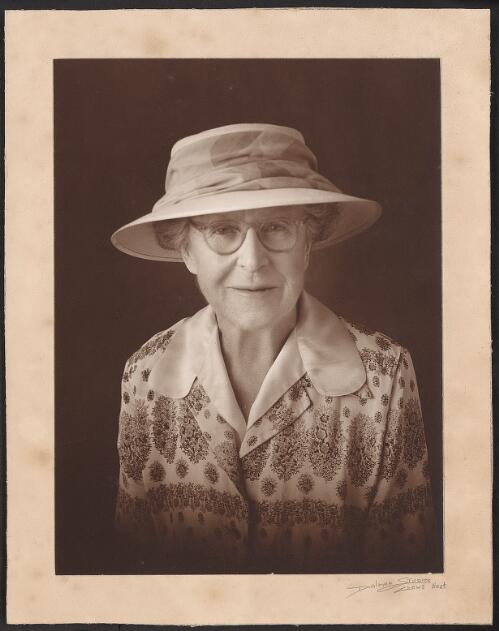
- Born: Ann Judith Fletcher; 30 June 1886; Katoomba, New South Wales, Australia
- Died: 30 July 1970 (aged 84); Glenorie, New South Wales
- Occupations: Photographer and Fashion designer
- Parents: Ann Marian Fletcher; John Walter Fletcher
- Relatives: Nora Kathleen Fletcher (sister); John Fletcher (brother)

Ann Judith Fletcher (30 June 1886 – 30 July 1970), known in later life as Judith Paszek, was a portrait and fashion photographer from Sydney.

== Early life ==
Fletcher was born on 30 June 1886 in Katoomba, New South Wales. Her parents were Ann Marian Fletcher nee Clarke, an embroiderer who made the velvet bag to hold The Ashes urn, and John Walter Fletcher, a teacher, cricketer, and police magistrate, who is known as the 'father of Australian football' for his role in introducing soccer to Australia. She had five siblings including Nora Kathleen Fletcher, a nurse who led the British Red Cross in France and Belgium as principal matron in World War I, and John Fletcher a cricketer and Queensland politician. Fletcher grew up in Katoomba until the family moved to Greenwich in Sydney, where she stayed until she was married in 1934.

== Career ==
She had a photography studio in Sydney's North Shore, where she worked from 1905 until 1930. The first few years in her studio and practiced and refined her skills as an amateur art and at-home portrait photographer, particularly focussing on portraits of women and children, and exhibited her work in photographic salons. She turned professional in 1908, with a focus in portraiture fashion and artistic photography. She opened a studio in the city of Sydney in 1909 at 313 George Street, above the tailor Chorley and Co.

Fletcher advertised her art photography using full page portraits of celebrities and socialites in Sydney Ure Smith's Art in Australia publication. As well as portraiture, Fletcher also worked in fashion photography.

Fletcher associated with other artists, including Arthur Streeton, May and Mina Moore. She had a particularly close association with Frank Bell, a photographer from Manly, she supplied him with his equipment, and helped him to develop his technique.

Fletcher took photographs of artists, actors and academics, such as Arthur Streeton, Marie Burke, and Winifred Betts. as well as prominent women in the philanthropy fields, such as Olive Kelso King, Mary Hughes, and Thea Stanley Hughes.

Fletcher continued to work and exhibit until the early 1930s.

== Personal life and death ==
Fletcher was a Theosophist, and in the 1920s she became involved in the Balmoral Beach Krishnamurti Star Amphitheatre movement. Fletcher took a portrait of fellow theosophist, the social activist Annie Besant.

On 28 August 1934 Fletcher married Gerard Paszek, a Polish violin maker. After she married she relocated first to Mount Kuringai, and then to Glenorie where she lived for the rest of her life. Her family stated that Paszek was a possessive man who would not let Fletcher out of his sight. She stopped connecting with former colleagues after her marriage.

Fletcher died on 30 July 1970 in Glenorie, New South Wales, aged 84 years old.
