= Reginald Studd =

English cricketer

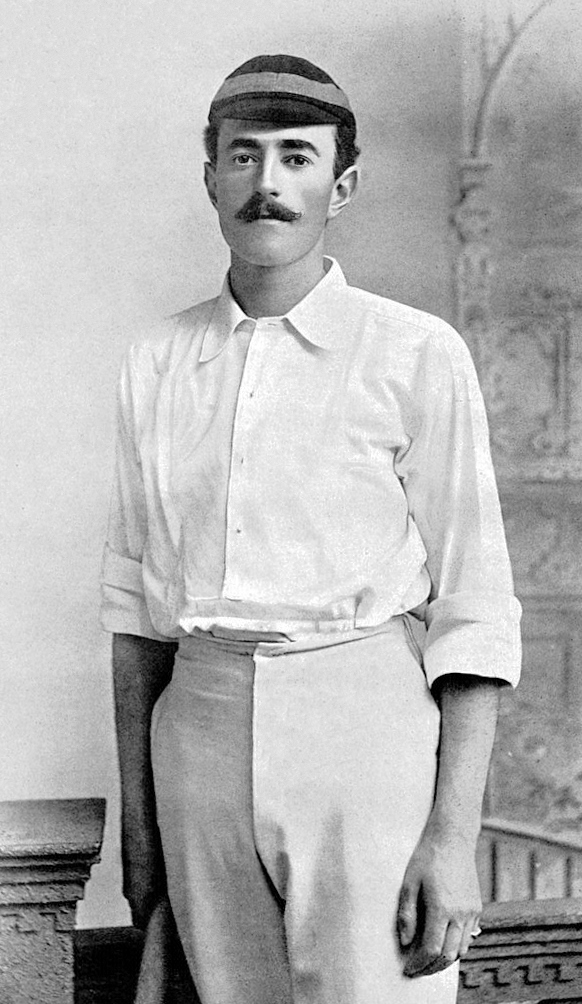
- Reginald Studd c. 1895

Personal information
- Full name: Reginald Augustus Studd
- Born: 18 December 1873; Tidworth, Wiltshire, England
- Died: 3 February 1948 (aged 74); Northampton, Northamptonshire, England
- Batting: Right-handed
- Relatives: Charles Studd (brother); George Studd (brother); Herbert Studd (brother); John Studd (brother)

Domestic team information
- Years: Team
- 1894: Marylebone Cricket Club
- 1895: Cambridge University
- 1895: Hampshire

Career statistics
Competition	First-class
Matches	15
Runs scored	603
Batting average	25.12
100s/50s	–/4
Top score	96*
Catches/stumpings	3/–
- Source: Cricinfo, 28 January 2010

Reginald Augustus Studd (18 December 1873 – 3 February 1948) was an English first-class cricketer.

The son of Edward Studd, he was born at Tedworth House in Wiltshire in December 1873. He was educated at Eton College, where he was the youngest of six brothers to play for the college cricket team, in addition to playing rackets. From Eton, he in 1892 matriculated to Trinity College, Cambridge. While studying at Cambridge, he made his debut in first-class cricket for the Marylebone Cricket Club (MCC) against Cambridge University at Lord's in 1894. The following season, he established himself in the Cambridge side and made ten appearances. He played in the 1895 University Match at Lord's, when Cambridge defeated a strong Oxford side. For Cambridge in 1895, he scored 384 runs at an average of 25.60, with a highest score of 96 not out. Later in the 1895 season, Studd made three appearances for Hampshire. One of these came against the MCC, with the other two coming in the County Championship, with him making 93 against Sussex. During the winter of 1895, he toured North America with Cambridge captain-elect Frank Mitchell's personal eleven, making one first-class appearance on the tour against a University of Pennsylvania Past and Present side. In fifteen first-class matches, he scored 603 runs at an average of 25.12, and made four half centuries.

Studd went onto become the director of the Anglo-Indian Planters Missionary. He died at Northampton in 3 February 1948.

== See also ==
- Studd brothers
