= Studd baronets =

Baronetcy in the Baronetage of the United Kingdom

The Studd Baronetcy, of Netheravon in the County of Wiltshire, is a title in the Baronetage of the United Kingdom. It was created on 16 October 1929 for the cricketer and businessman Kynaston Studd. He was the eldest of the famous Studd brothers.

== Studd baronets, of Netheravon (1929) ==
- Sir (John Edward) Kynaston Studd, 1st Baronet (1858–1944)
- Sir Eric Studd, 2nd Baronet (1887–1975)
- Sir (Robert) Kynaston Studd, 3rd Baronet (1926–1977)
- Sir Edward Fairfax Studd, 4th Baronet (1929–2025)
- Sir Philip Alastair Fairfax Studd, 5th Baronet (born 1961)

The heir apparent is the present holder's son Kynaston Roger Fairfax Studd (born 1993).

== Sources ==
- Kidd, Charles, Williamson, David (editors). Debrett's Peerage and Baronetage (1990 edition). New York: St Martin's Press, 1990,
- Leigh Rayment's list of baronets
