= Nora Kathleen Fletcher =

Australian nurse (1880–1976)

Nora Kathleen Fletcher CBE RRC
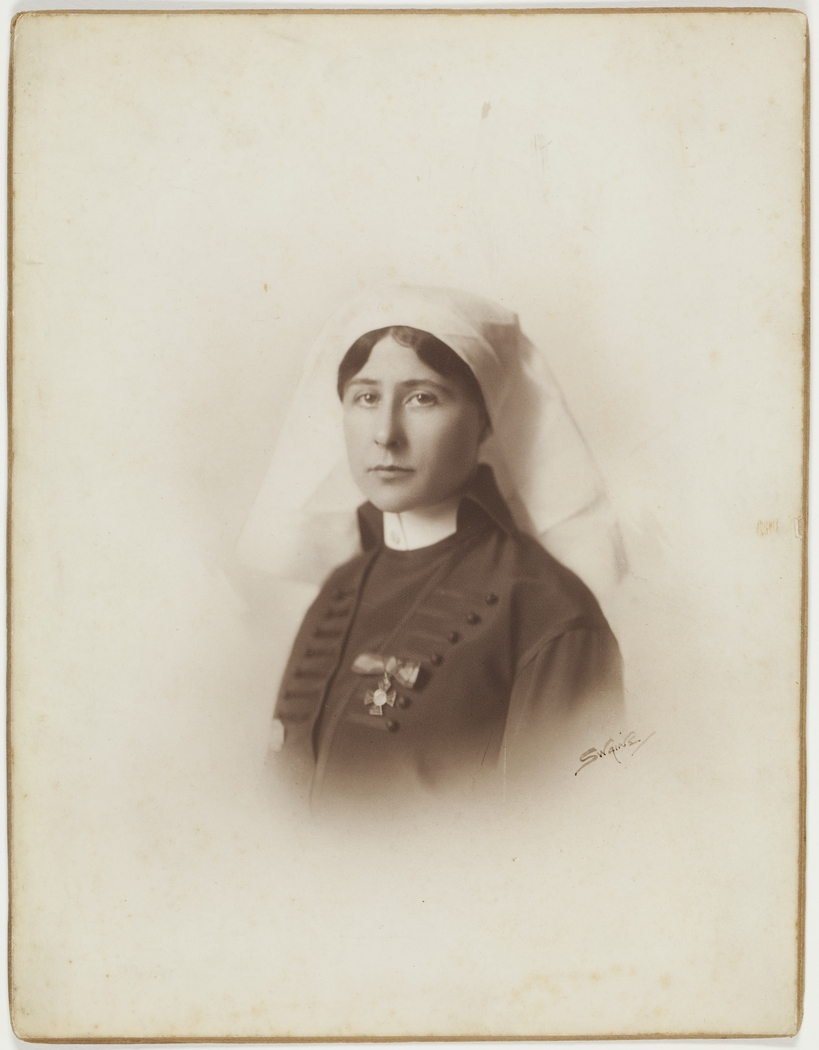
- Born: 1 February 1880; Woollahra, New South Wales, Australia
- Died: 18 August 1976 (aged 96); Torquay, Devon
- Other name: Paula Ian Alexander
- Occupation: Nurse
- Employer: British Red Cross
- Known for: Principal matron of the British Red Cross nurses in France and Belgium during World War I
- Parents: Ann Marian Fletcher; John Walter Fletcher
- Relatives: Judith Fletcher (sister); John Fletcher (brother)

Nora Kathleen Fletcher (1 February 1880 – 18 August 1976), known in later life as Paula Ian Alexander, was a decorated Australian nurse, who led the British Red Cross nurses in France and Belgium as principal matron during World War I.

== Early life ==
Fletcher was born on 1 February 1880 in the Sydney suburb of Woollahra. Her parents were Ann Marian Fletcher née Clarke, an embroiderer who made the velvet bag to hold The Ashes urn, and John Walter Fletcher. Her brother, John Fletcher, became a politician in Queensland. She was educated privately by a governess. When she was 20, she went to train to be a nurse at the St Kilda Hospital in Woolloomooloo. She was appointed as a probationary nurse in the public service in 1902, and graduated as a nurse in 1906 from the Coast Hospital (later known as Prince Henry Hospital) in Little Bay.

== Career ==
Six years before World War I broke out, Fletcher moved to England. During this time, in her work as a nurse she travelled to places such as the French Riviera, Italy and Cairo. After war was declared, she joined the British Red Cross in September 1914.

Fletcher was one of the first of the British Red Cross nurses to arrive in France, and she was among the last to leave. She was based in Boulogne. She was promoted to matron, taking command of a unit. She soon became the principal matron of all the British Red Cross personnel in France and Belgium hospitals, with up to 400 army sisters under her charge, organising the movement of all women workers who passed through France, Italy, Malta and Egypt. Praise for her work included:

"Miss Fletcher has an extensive knowledge of people and things; she is an excellent organiser, very energetic, tactful, direct and broad-minded, loyal to those whom she serves and is respected by her fellow workers and subordinates."

In 1915, in a ceremony at Buckingham Palace, King George V awarded Fletcher the Royal Red Cross (1st class) for her distinguished service in France. In 1916, Fletcher was made an Honorary Serving Sister of the Order of St. John of Jerusalem. She was made a Commander of the Order of the British Empire in 1920. In November 1921, the French government awarded her the Medal of French Gratitude (Médaille de la Reconnaissance française) for her work during the war.

== Later life ==
In 1968, Fletcher's brother and sister donated her papers, photographs and medals to the State Library of New South Wales.

Fletcher, who was known as Paula Ian Alexander, spent her later life living in Torquay, Devon, England, and died there aged 96, in the Ardvar nursing home, on 18 August 1976.
