= Herbert Studd =

English first-class cricketer and soldier

Brigadier-General Herbert Studd CB CMG DSO
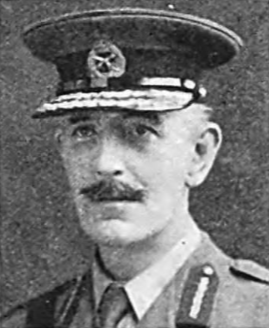
- Born: Herbert William Studd; 26 December 1870; Tedworth House, Tidworth, Hampshire, England
- Died: 8 August 1947 (aged 76); Bayswater, London
- Cricket career

Personal information
- Batting: Right-handed
- Relatives: Arthur Studd (brother); Charles Studd (brother); George Studd (brother); Reginald Studd (brother); Kynaston Studd (brother)

Domestic team information
- Years: Team
- 1898: Hampshire
- 1890–1892: MCC
- 1890: Middlesex

Career statistics
Competition	First-class
Matches	8
Runs scored	352
Batting average	27.07
100s/50s	0/2
Top score	71
Balls bowled	95
Wickets	1
Bowling average	71.00
5 wickets in innings	0
10 wickets in match	0
Best bowling	1/23
Catches/stumpings	5/–
- Source: Cricinfo, 24 January 2010

Brigadier-General Herbert William Studd CB CMG DSO (26 December 1870 – 8 August 1947) was a British Army officer and an English first-class cricketer.

== Cricketer ==
Studd was educated at Eton and Trinity College, Cambridge. He was a right-handed batsman. He made his first-class debut for Middlesex against the touring Australians in 1890. During the match Studd took his only first-class wicket, that of Jack Blackham. This match was to be Studd's only appearance for Middlesex.

Studd's next first-class appearance came in the same season for the Marylebone Cricket Club, playing two first-class matches against Cambridge University and Oxford University. Five years later, Studd toured Ireland with the Marylebone Cricket Club, playing a single first-class match against Dublin University, during which he made his maiden first-class half century, scoring 71. This was his final first-class match for the club. In Studd's three matches for the club he scored 132 runs at an average of 26.40, with a high score of 71.

In 1898 Studd joined Hampshire, making his debut for the club in the County Championship against Leicestershire, where on debut Studd made scores of 49 and 44. His second first-class half century came later in the season against Sussex, where he scored 60 in Hampshire's first innings. Studd's final first-class match came against Warwickshire later in the 1898 season. In his five first-class matches for the county he scored 217 runs at an average of 31.00, with a high score of 60.

In his overall first-class career Studd scored 352 runs at an average of 27.07.

== Soldier ==
Studd was commissioned into the Coldstream Guards as a second lieutenant on 25 July 1891, and promoted to lieutenant on 2 January 1897.

He served in South Africa through the Second Boer War 1899–1902; where he took part in operations in the Orange Free State (April to May 1900), the Transvaal (May to June 1900, July to November 1900) and Cape Colony; and was present at several major battles, including at Belmont, Enslin and Modder River (November 1899), Magersfontein (December 1899), Poplar Grove and Driefontein (March 1900), Diamond Hill (June 1900), Bergendal and Komatipoort (August 1900). For his services during the war, he was promoted to captain on 11 February 1900, and was awarded the Queen's and King's Medals, a mention in despatches and the Distinguished Service Order (DSO). Following the end of the war, he return to the United Kingdom in August 1902.

He passed the Staff College, Camberley, in 1905 and served as a deputy assistant adjutant general (DAAG), London District 1905–1909, during which time he was promoted to major on 24 June 1908, and on 1 April 1912 succeeded Cecil Romer as a GSO2.

He served through the Great War, was severely wounded and mentioned in despatches, and was awarded the CMG, CB and numerous foreign orders. He was promoted to lieutenant-colonel, brevet colonel and temporary brigadier-general. During the war he first commanded 19th Reserve Brigade, then 180th Brigade. He was Chief of Staff of XI Corps 1916–17 and of the British Section of the Supreme War Council 1917–1919.

He returned to England to command his regiment in 1919 and retired on account of ill-health caused by wounds in 1923, when he was granted the honorary full rank of brigadier-general.

Studd died at Bayswater, London, on 8 August 1947, at the age of 77.

== Family ==
Herbert Studd was a son of Edward Studd, a rich planter who, on returning from India, took the lease of Tedworth House, Tidworth, Hampshire. In 1894 Herbert married Mary Cole, née de Vere, granddaughter of Sir Aubrey de Vere, 2nd Baronet. She was widow of Major William Cole, 3rd Dragoon Guards (one of their sons was Horace de Vere Cole). They had two daughters. She died in 1930 and he remarried to Alice Maude Tullis.

== Honours ==
- Companion of The Most Honourable Order of the Bath (CB)
- Companion of The Most Distinguished Order of St Michael and St George (CMG)
- Distinguished Service Order (DSO)
- Queen's South Africa Medal with six clasps
- King's South Africa Medal with two clasps
- Mention in Despatches (South African War)
- Mention in Despatches (Great War) (twice)
- Commander, Legion of Honour (France)
- Officer, Order of Leopold (Belgium)
- Croce di Guerra (Italy)
- Commander, Order of the Crown of Italy
- Distinguished Service Medal (U.S. Army)
