= Ann Marian Fletcher =

British Australian embroiderer (1851–1935)

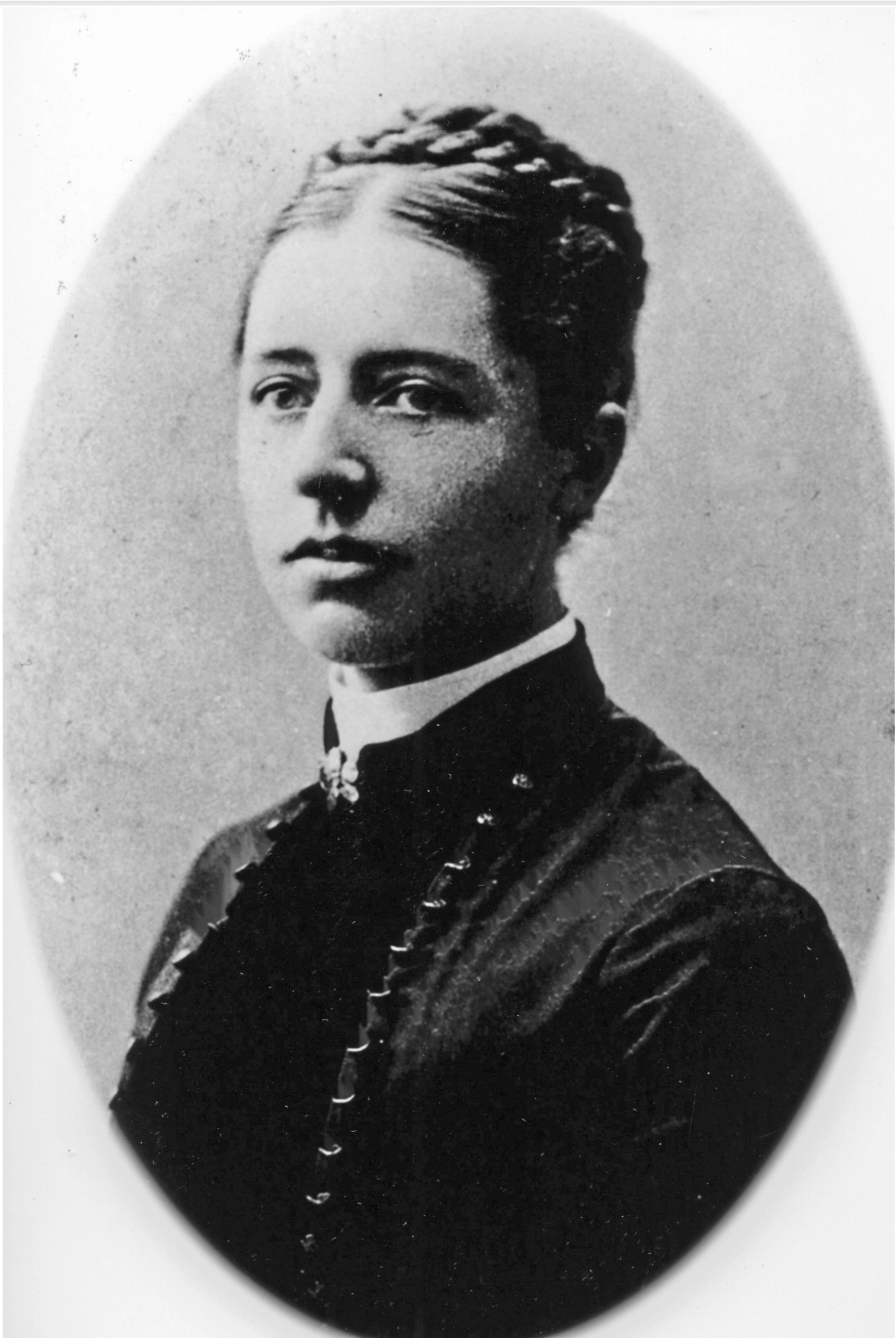
- Born: Ann Marian Clarke; 1851; Dublin, Ireland
- Died: 5 June 1935 (aged 83–84); Greenwich, New South Wales
- Known for: Making the red velvet bag that accompanies The Ashes urn
- Spouse: John Walter Fletcher (m. 1876)
- Children: Nora Kathleen Fletcher; John Fletcher; Judith Fletcher

Ann Marian Fletcher (born Ann Marian Clarke, 1851 – 5 June 1935), was an Irish Australian embroiderer, school administrator, and boarding house operator. She is best known for embroidering the small red velvet bag that accompanies The Ashes urn.

== Early life and family ==
Fletcher was born Ann Marian Clarke, in Dublin Ireland in 1851, to Marian Clarke nee Wright, and Captain Joseph Hines Clarke. Marian and Joseph were the matron and superintendent respectively of the Newcastle Industrial School for Girls from the 26 January 1869 until April 1871. Prior to working at the school, her father fought in the Second Taranaki war in New Zealand, first as a lieutenant, and then as a captain.

Fletcher married John Walter Fletcher on 28 June 1876 at St Thomas's Church in Willoughby. They had six children, including Nora Kathleen Fletcher who was a decorated British Red Cross principal matron in World War I; John Fletcher a cricketer and politician; and photographer and fashion designer Judith Fletcher.

== Career ==
=== School administrator ===
Fletcher's husband had started a school called Cooren College in Sydney. In 1884, the Fletchers moved the boarding school to Katoomba, and renamed it Katoomba College. Fletcher managed the school. In the 1890s the school was forced to close due to the depression.

=== Boarding house manager ===
After the college was closed, from at least 1892, Fletcher founded a boarding house in the college building, called The Priory. She ran the Priory until at least 1895, during which year, a rumour that it had been sold to the Catholic Church was refuted in the newspaper. The Fletchers listed it for sale in 1896, and they had left Katoomba by 1897.

=== Embroiderer ===
Fletcher's spouse John was involved with the Australian cricket team that won a game against England in August 1882 on English soil. England's loss led Reginald Brooks to write an obituary for English cricket in the Sporting Times in September 1882. The loss also caused Ivo Bligh and his fellow English cricketers to visit Australia from late 1882, until early 1883 try to reclaim victory. During this trip, both the English team and the Australian team, along with Australian officials including John Fletcher, were guests at Rupertswood, Sunbury, Victoria, the residence of the president of the Melbourne Cricket Club, Sir William Clark. The teams played another three games, of which England won two of the three. Following the games Clark's daughter, Lady Janet Clarke, and Florence Morphy presented the English team with the 'ashes of Australian cricket', in little perfume bottle re-styled into an urn. When John returned home, he told Fletcher the story of the matches, and the urn. Enlisting the assistance of their family friend, William Blamire Young, who designed an emblem with '1883' at its centre, Fletcher created and embroidered a little red velvet bag with the emblem, in which the urn was carried back to England by Bligh and his team. Bligh sent a thankyou note to Fletcher for the 'pretty little bag', in a letter that is now on display in the MCC at Lords, as is the urn and the velvet bag.

in 1907, Fletcher exhibited a needle painting that she created, with a design by Blamire Young, at the Women's Work Exhibition in Melbourne, and the piece won first prize in its category.

Another of Fletcher's embroidery pieces, a fire guard, was donated by her daughter Marion Dorothy McLaurin to the Blue Mountains Historical society, and is on display in their Tarella Cottage at Wentworth Falls.

== Death ==
Fletcher died at her Sydney home, 32 George Street Greenwich, on 5 June 1935.
