= Studd brothers =

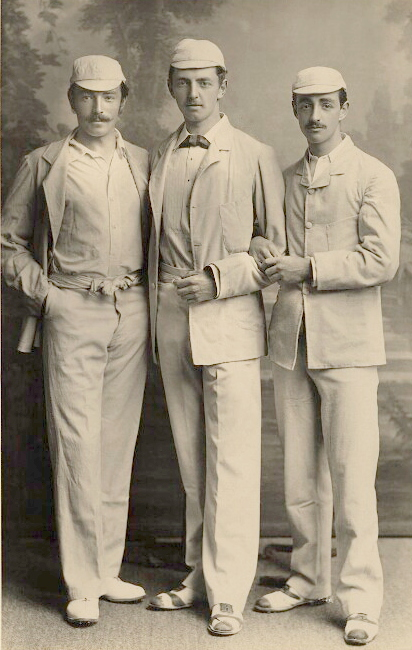
Kynaston Studd (left), Charles Studd (centre) and George Studd (right)

The Studd brothers, Sir John Edward Kynaston, George (GB) and Charles (CT), were Victorian gentleman cricketers, educated at Eton and Cambridge. These three brothers represented Eton in the Eton v Harrow annual needle match and represented Cambridge at cricket and dominated the Cambridge cricket scene in the early 1880s.

Their father Edward Studd, who had 11 children in all, was born in Bombay and made his fortune in indigo manufacture. Kynaston, GB and CT were the oldest sons of their father's second wife, Dora Sophia née Thomas, and were brought up at Spratton Hall in Northamptonshire, Hallaton Hall in Leicestershire, and Tedworth House in Wiltshire. The family also had a residence in Hyde Park Gardens.

Kynaston, George and CT were still at Eton when their father became a born-again Christian and they were far from pleased by his efforts to interest them in the gospel. However, these three themselves converted when a visiting preacher went to stay with the Studd family during the summer holidays of 1878, an event that was to have a profound influence on the rest of their lives.

They excelled at cricket initially at Cheam School, then at Eton, and later at Trinity College, Cambridge, where the brothers achieved a remarkable record of each captaining the university cricket team in successive seasons from 1882 to 1884. The exceptional skills shown by CT gained him a place in the England team in 1882 which lost the match to Australia which originated the tradition of "the Ashes" between the two countries. The following winter he toured Australia with the Marylebone Cricket Club (MCC) team who recovered the trophy.

== The famous Ashes ==
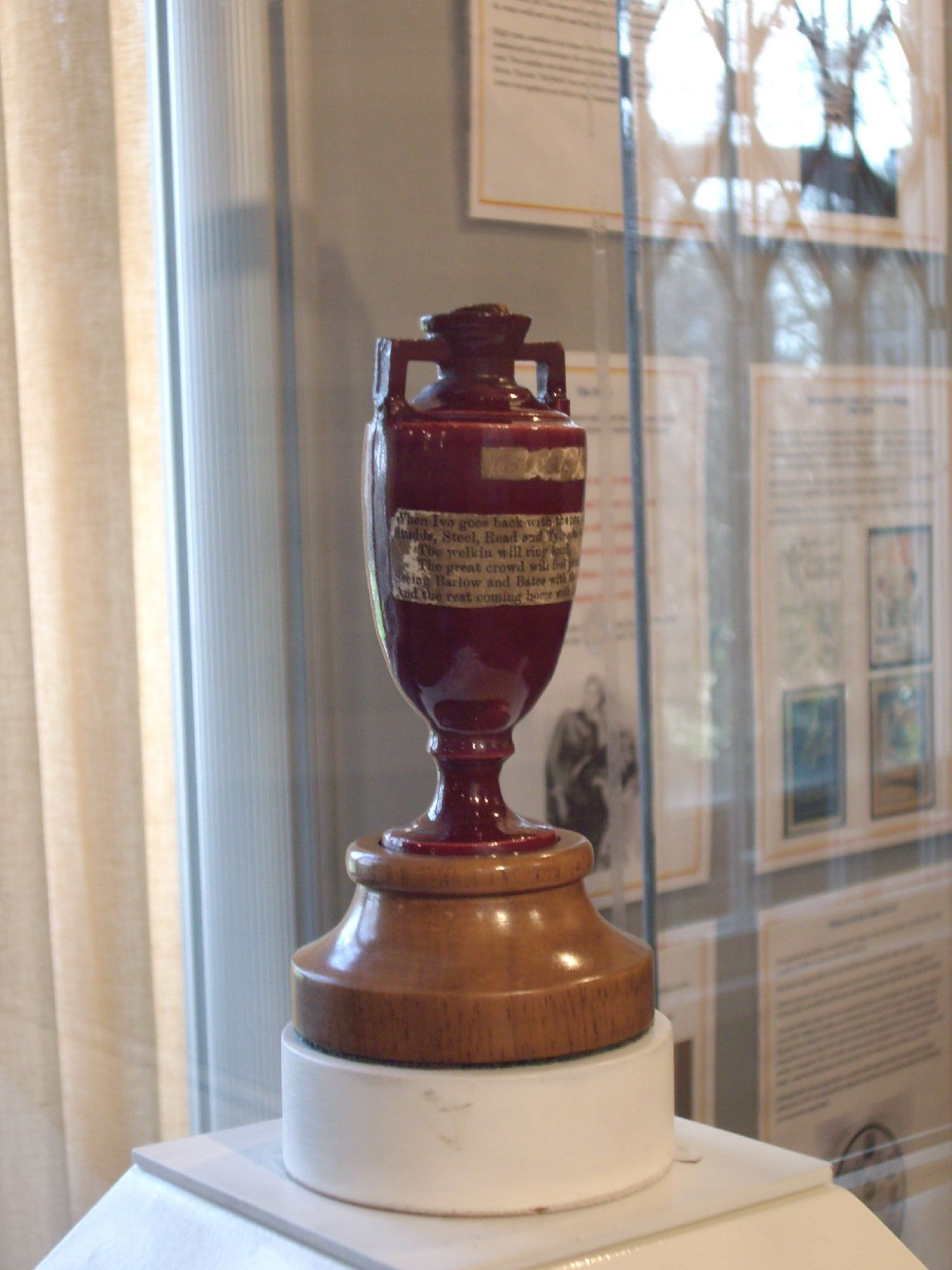
The Ashes urn

Charles played in the original test against Australia, where the Ashes were first named, and was one of the last two batsman in.

The match was low scoring and had been affected by recent rain. Australia batted first and scored 63; England only managed 101 in reply. In their second innings the Australians scored 122, so on the second day, England needed only 85 to win. When England's last batsman went in the team needed only 10 runs to win, but the final batsman Edmund Peate scored only 2 before being bowled by Boyle. The astonished crowd fell silent, not believing that England could possibly have lost by 7 runs. When what had happened had sunk in, the crowd cheered the Australians.

When Peate returned to the pavilion he was reprimanded by the captain WG Grace for not allowing his partner at the wicket, CT Studd, to get the runs. Despite Studd being one of the best batsmen in England, Peate replied, "I had no confidence in Mr Studd, sir, so thought I had better do my best." By now the damage was done and The Sporting Times next headlined with the following famous phrase:

IN AFFECTIONATE REMEMBRANCE
OF ENGLISH CRICKET
WHICH DIED AT THE OVAL, 29th AUGUST, 1882,
DEEPLY LAMENTED BY A LARGE CIRCLE OF
SORROWING FRIENDS AND ACQUAINTANCES
R.I.P.
N.B.-THE BODY WILL BE CREMATED AND THE
ASHES TAKEN TO AUSTRALIA.

Longer-lasting fame continues for the brothers in the form of the inscription on the Ashes' urn, which reads:

When Ivo goes back with the urn, the urn;
Studds, Steel, Read and Tylecote return, return;
The welkin will ring loud,
The great crowd will feel proud,
Seeing Barlow and Bates with the urn, the urn;
And the rest coming home with the urn.

== Studd family ==
Articles relating to the famous three brothers:

  - Charles Studd
  - Priscilla Studd (wife)
  - Cambridge Seven (missionaries to China)
- Kynaston Studd
- George Studd

=== The minor brothers ===
Four more Studd brothers were competent cricketers, and all played for MCC, but did not rise to the fame of their siblings:

- Edward John Charles Studd

Born 13 February 1849, Tirhoot, India
Died 1 March 1909, Folkestone, Kent, England
Cricket teams: Eton, Cheltenham (1866), MCC

- Reginald Augustus Studd

Born 18 December 1873, Tedworth House, Wiltshire
Died 3 February 1948, Northampton
Cricket teams: Eton, Blue at Cambridge in 1895, Hampshire, MCC

- Arthur Haythorne Studd, known as a painter and art collector

Born 19 November 1863, Hallaton Hall, Hallaton, Leicestershire
Died 26 January 1919, Marylebone, London
Cricket teams: Eton, MCC

- Herbert William Studd, army officer

Born 26 December 1870, Tedworth House, Wiltshire
Died 8 August 1947, Bayswater, London
Cricket teams: Eton, Middlesex, MCC, Hampshire

A great-nephew Peter was also a notable cricketer, and Lord Mayor of London in 1970.

== See also ==
- Studd Trophy – an annual award named after Kynaston Studd
