= CLC International =

Publishing house

- Formation: November 1, 1941; 85 years ago
- Type: INGO
- Legal status: mission
- Purpose: Christian literature distribution
- Headquarters: Sheffield, United Kingdom
- Region served: 43 countries
- Official language: English
- International Director: Gary Chamberlin
- Main organ: International Council
- Staff: over 600
- Website: http://www.clcinternational.org

CLC International is an International evangelical Christian Literature bookshop and publisher. The headquarters are situated in Sheffield, United Kingdom.

== History ==
CLC was founded in 1941 in Colchester, England by Ken Adams and his wife Bessie as “The Evangelical Publishing House”. This publishing house worked actively even through the difficulties of the Second World War. Early on they aligned themselves with WEC International and its Secretary Norman Grubb. In 1944 the first departments appeared out of England: in Australia and Canada; next non-English CLC bookshops were founded in the United States and Dominica in 1947. After that, the opening of new bookshops and Christian publishing houses took place almost every year. As of 2025, it is represented by more than 120 bookshops, 18 distribution warehouses and 18 publishing houses in 43 countries.

== Founders ==
=== Ken and Bessie Adams ===
Ken Adams and Bessie Adams founded CLC International in 1941 in Colchester, England. Prior to establishing the ministry, Ken had studied at a Bible college in Scotland and operated a Christian bookstore. He met Bessie Miners during an evangelistic campaign in Cornwall, and the couple married in 1938. They soon joined the Friends Evangelistic Band, where they gained experience in itinerant ministry and literature distribution.

The Adamses launched the first CLC bookshop in a rented space in Colchester with the aim of making Christian literature available to as many people as possible, both in the UK and around the world. Their vision was rooted in the belief that access to Christian books could support both evangelism and discipleship.

Following early growth in the UK, the Adamses supported CLC’s global expansion. The Adamses are remembered for their organizational leadership and their role in founding an international Christian literature ministry that continues to operate globally.

== Organization ==
Gary Chamberlin was elected as the new International Director in 2021, succeeding Gerardo Scalante. The CLC work in each country is set up independently. While CLC departments are united by common vision, goals and International Constitution, they are independent in the realization of the declared goals.

== See also ==
- Evangelism
- Christian literature
- Christian media
