= Studds =

Studds may refer to:

- Gerry Studds (1937–2006), American politician.
- Robert Francis Anthony Studds (1896–1962), American admiral and engineer, fourth Director of the United States Coast and Geodetic Survey.

See also

- Studd (disambiguation)
