= Malden A. Studd =

British Army officer and philatelist

Brigadier Malden Augustus Studd DSO, MC, (29 September 1887 – 23 November 1973) was a British Army officer and philatelist who signed the Roll of Distinguished Philatelists in 1951. His son was Peter Malden Studd, a Lord Mayor of London.

== Military career ==
During the first World War he was mentioned in despatches. He won the Distinguished Service Order and the Military Cross. In the latter years of his army service, Studd was aide-de-camp to King George VI.

== Philately ==
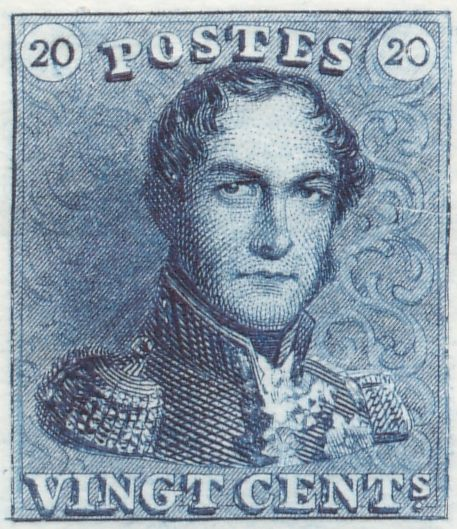
The "Epaulettes" stamps of Belgium were a specialism of Studd

Studd only took up philately seriously after his retirement from the Army. His first collections were of the stamps of Bechuanaland and Norway. He later specialised in Canada before moving on to the Epaulettes and Medallion issues of Belgium. He made a study of the maritime cancellations of the world and in 1970 gave a display of the Quetzal issues of Guatemala to the Royal Philatelic Society London, of which he had been a member since 1924 (Fellow 1927).
