= John Fletcher (Queensland politician) =

Australian politician

John Fletcher OBE

Member of the Queensland Legislative Assembly for Port Curtis
- In office 9 October 1920 – 12 May 1923
- Preceded by: George Carter
- Succeeded by: George Carter

Personal details
- Born: John William Fletcher; 25 January 1884 Sydney, Australia
- Died: 13 March 1965 (aged 81) Brisbane, Queensland, Australia
- Party: National
- Spouse(s): Evelyn Barbara de Winton (m. 1910 d. 1931), Amy Muriel Cribb (m. 1934)
- Occupation: Cricketer, Sheep grazier, businessman

John William Fletcher OBE (25 January 1884 – 13 March 1965) was a politician in Queensland, Australia. He was a Member of the Queensland Legislative Assembly.

== Early life ==
John William Fletcher was born to Ann Marian Fletcher nee Clarke, an embroiderer who made the velvet bag to hold The Ashes urn, and John Walter Fletcher, a teacher, cricketer, and police magistrate, who is known as the father of football in Australia, as he was instrumental in introducing soccer to the country. Fletcher's older sister was Nora Kathleen Fletcher, a nurse who served in World War I as the principal matron of the British Red Cross for France and Belgium, and another sister Judith Fletcher, was a photographer in Sydney.

== Politics ==
Fletcher was the National member for Port Curtis in the Legislative Assembly of Queensland from 1920 to 1923.

In 1931, Fletcher was chairman of the Booringa Shire Council.

== Cricketing career ==
Fletcher played three games of first-class cricket for Queensland in 1909–1910. He scored 97 runs at an average of 16.16 and did not take any wickets.

Parliament of Queensland
Preceded by George Carter	Member for Port Curtis; 1920–1923	Succeeded by George Carter
