= Priscilla Studd =

British Protestant missionary

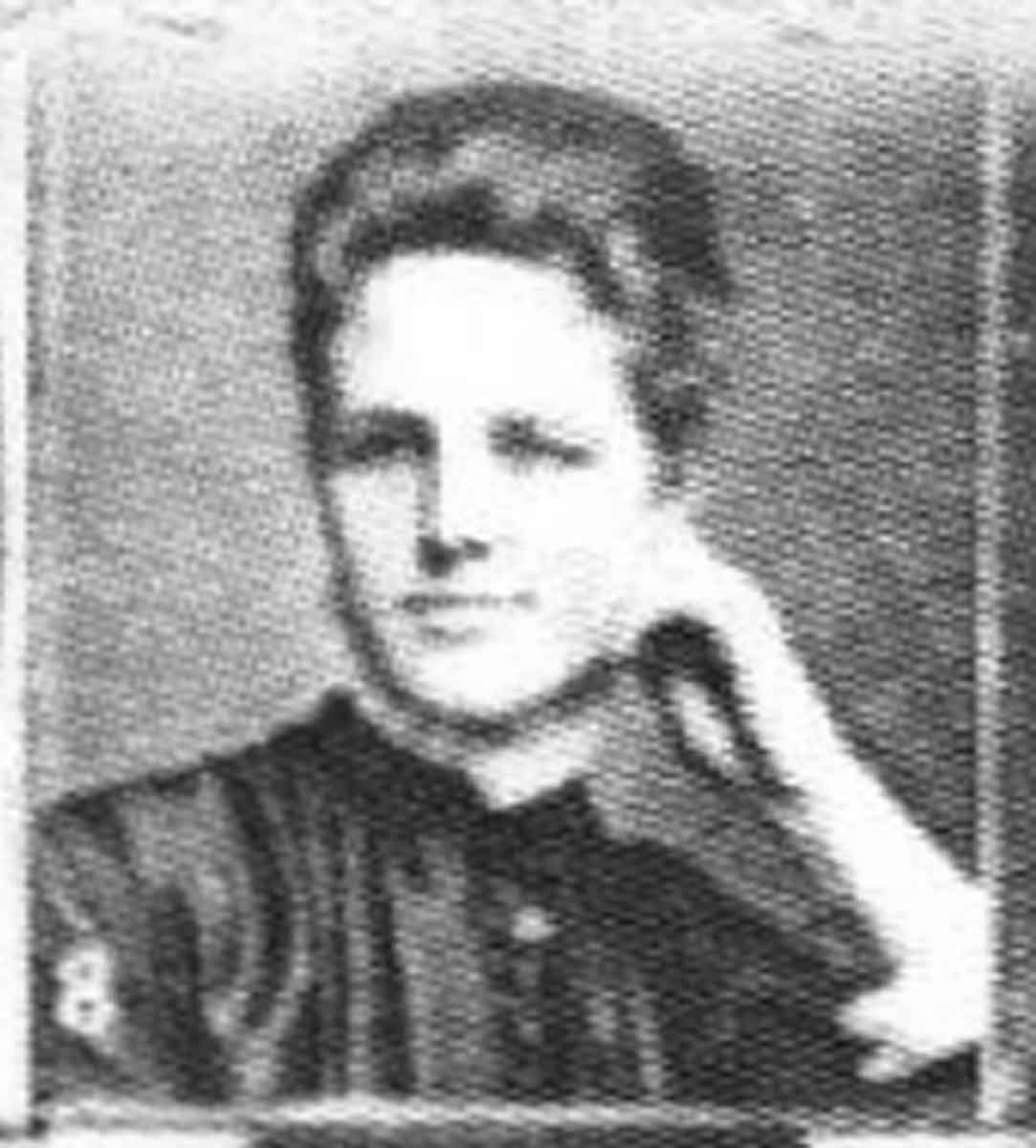
- Born: Priscilla Livingstone Stewart; 28 August 1864; Belfast, Ireland
- Died: 15 January 1929; Málaga, Andalusia, Spain

Priscilla "Scilla" Studd (née Livingstone Stewart; 28 August 1864 – 15 January 1929) was a British Christian missionary and wife of Charles Studd.

== Life and career ==
Born in Belfast, Ireland (modern-day Northern Ireland), Priscilla Stewart arrived in Shanghai in 1887 as part of The Hundred missionaries of the China Inland Mission and was one of a large party to arrive together. She served as a Salvation Army officer. She was reported as being both Irish in her looks and in her spirit, with blue eyes and golden hair. After a while in Shanghai she moved with three other women to work inland at the city of Ta-Ku-Tang.

Of her new-found calling she said,

I am a missionary now, but I was not made that way. Had you asked me to come to a meeting when I was a girl, I would have said, 'No, thank you, none of your religion for me'; for my idea of a person loving God was to have a face as long as a coffee pot.

In China, after praying whilst kneeling in the snow, she became seriously ill with pneumonia, so much so that she sent for her then fiancé Charles Studd, who was himself recovering from an attack of pleurisy. After a while she started to recover but the local people said that having sent for Charles from so far, they must marry – and Charles agreed. He was a fellow missionary who had arrived in China in 1885 as one of the Cambridge Seven. In 1888, they went through a wedding ceremony with Pastor Xi Shengmo – who was unlicensed – but it pleased the locals. After their wedding the Studds moved to another inland city, Lungang-Fu. They had four daughters – Grace, Dorothy, Edith and Pauline; two sons died in infancy.

In 1894, the couple returned to England and then between 1900 and 1906 they worked in India. After another return to England, Charles' missionary work took him alone to Africa and the last sixteen years of their married life were spent apart, Charles remaining in Africa and Priscilla in England, where she laboured with the newly formed Worldwide Evangelization Crusade. She died in 1929 and was buried in the English Cemetery in Málaga.

== See also ==
- Studd brothers
- List of Protestant missionaries in China
- Protestant missions in China
- Christianity in China

== External sources ==
- C.T. Studd: Cricketer and Pioneer by Norman Grubb, ISBN 0-7188-3028-8
- Christian Biography Resources
