= 180th (2/5th London) Brigade =

Military unit

The 180th (2/5th London) Brigade was a formation of the British Army during the First World War. It was assigned to the 60th (2/2nd London) Division and served in the Middle East.

== Formation ==
All battalions of the London Regiment as follows:

- 2/17th (County of London) Battalion (Poplar and Stepney Rifles)
- 2/18th (County of London) Battalion (London Irish Rifles)
- 2/19th (County of London) Battalion (St Pancras)
- 2/20th (County of London) Battalion (Blackheath and Woolwich)
- 180th Machine Gun Company
- 180th Trench Mortar Battery

In June 1918 three battalions (2/17th, 2/18th and 2/20th) were replaced by

- 2nd Battalion, 30th Punjabis
- 1st Battalion, 50th Kumaon Rifles
- 2nd Battalion, Guides Infantry

== Commanders ==
Commanding officers
Rank	Name	Date appointed	Notes
Colonel	G. H. Turner	27 November 1914	
Lieutenant-Colonel	H. A. Christmas	28 December 1915	Acting
Colonel	G. H. Turner	5 January 1916	
Brigadier-General	H. W. Studd	30 January 1916	
Brigadier-General	F. M. Carleton	9 November 1916	
Lieutenant-Colonel	A. E. Norton	29 August 1917	Acting
Brigadier-General	J. Hill	30 August 1917	
Brigadier-General	C. F. Watson	11 September 1917	
