= John Walter Fletcher =

Australian teacher, footballer and magistrate

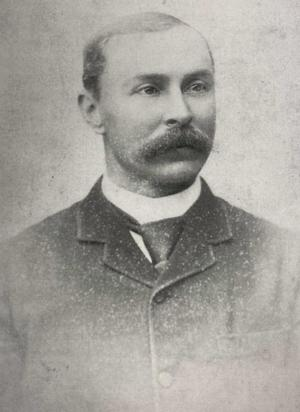
- Born: 11 April 1847; London, England
- Died: 28 February 1918 (aged 70); Neutral Bay, New South Wales, Australia
- Occupations: Teacher, footballer, sports administrator, cricketer, magistrate
- Spouse: Ann Marian Fletcher (m. 1876)
- Relatives: Nora Kathleen Fletcher (daughter); John Fletcher (son); Judith Fletcher (daughter)

John Walter Fletcher (11 May 1847 – 28 February 1918) is widely regarded as the "father of Australian soccer". He was also prominent in New South Wales as a teacher and a magistrate.

== Early life ==
Fletcher was born in London, the son of Harriet Fletcher (later Bathurst) and John Rolt. He was educated at Redhill School, in Redhill, Surrey and at Cheltenham College. In 1866, Fletcher entered Pembroke College, University of Oxford and graduated in 1869 with a Bachelor of Arts (second class honours). While at Oxford, he took a keen interest in sport, especially long distance running, and acquired a blue in athletics. In 1879, Fletcher obtained his Master's degree from Oxford.

== Career ==
In 1875, Fletcher had emigrated to Australia and began working as a teacher at a private school called Oaklands, at Mittagong, New South Wales. In 1877, Fletcher established his own private boys’ school in Sydney, which he named Coreen College. During this period, Fletcher met Anne Marian Clarke, whom he married at St Thomas's Church of England, North Sydney. The couple settled in Woollahra and Fletcher served as secretary of Paddington Cricket Club.

Fletcher also began to work towards the establishment of Association football (soccer) in Sydney, and in July 1880 publicly advocated for the code as a solution to the city's ongoing debate between rugby and Australian rules for supremacy. In short time the first club, Wanderers FC, was formed on 3 August 1880, with Fletcher as its founding secretary. On 14 August 1880 the first official game was played between Wanderers (including Fletcher) and the King's School rugby team, at Parramatta Common, Parramatta.

In 1882, he formed the New South Wales English Football Association (some sources refer to it as the Southern British Football Soccer Association), Australia's first soccer association and one of the first to be established outside the United Kingdom. The word "English" was necessary to distinguish the association from organisations related to Rugby football, which had already been established as the most popular code of football in the Sydney area.

Fletcher was in the NSW cricket squad that played Victoria in Melbourne in December 1882, although he was never a member of the playing team. Anne Fletcher also achieved sporting notability in 1883, by embroidering the velvet bag in which "The Ashes of English Cricket" were returned to England with the England cricket team. It is possible that Fletcher himself poured The Ashes into their urn.

He moved Coreen College to Katoomba in 1884, and renamed it Katoomba College. Fletcher was involved in the establishment of soccer clubs in the Blue Mountains and from 1891 to 1894, served as President of the Katoomba School of Arts. In 1893, a major economic downturn forced Katoomba College to close, and Fletcher joined the Bar that same year.

In May 1898, he took up a position with the New South Wales Department of Justice. In 1899, he was appointed police magistrate at Wilcannia, and was transferred to Moree in 1902. In 1904 he became a relieving police magistrate, before retiring in 1914. He then lived in Neutral Bay. Fletcher is buried at Gore Hill Cemetery.

== Personal life ==
Fletcher had six children, including Nora Kathleen Fletcher, a nurse who served in World War I as the principal matron of the British Red Cross for France and Belgium; and John William Fletcher, a prominent pastoralist and public figure in Queensland, and Judith Fletcher a photographer based in Sydney.

In 1999, John Walter Fletcher was inducted into the Football Hall of Fame.
