= Charles Studd =

British cricketer and missionary (1860 – 1931)

The Reverend Charles Studd
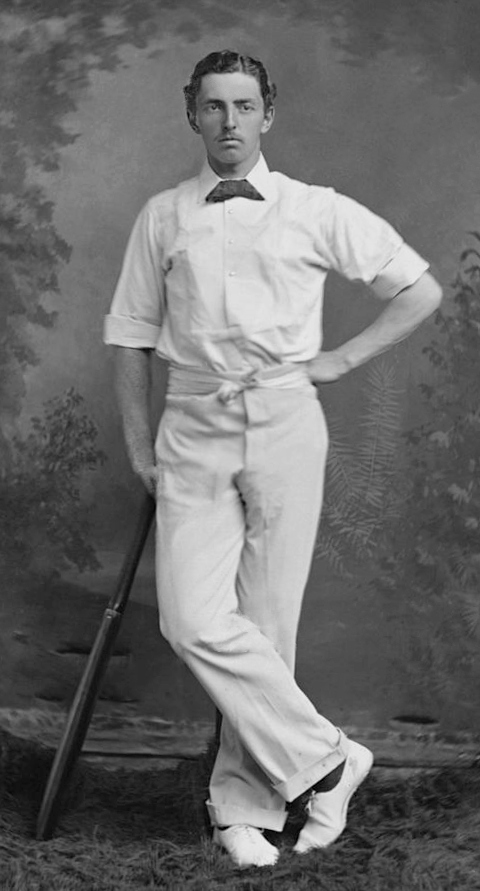
- Studd pictured in about 1882

Personal information
- Full name: Charles Thomas Studd
- Born: 2 December 1860; Spratton, Northamptonshire, England
- Died: 16 July 1931 (aged 70); Ibambi, Belgian Congo
- Batting: Right-handed
- Bowling: Right-arm medium-fast
- Relatives: Arthur Studd (brother); George Studd (brother); Herbert Studd (brother); Kynaston Studd (brother); Reginald Studd (brother)

International information
- National side: England (1882–1883)
- Test debut (cap 37): 28 August 1882 v Australia
- Last Test: 17 February 1883 v Australia

Domestic team information
- Years: Team
- 1879–1884: Middlesex
- 1880–1883: Cambridge University
- 1881–1884: MCC

Career statistics
Competition	Test	First-class
Matches	5	99
Runs scored	160	4,391
Batting average	20.00	30.49
100s/50s	0/0	8/14
Top score	48	175*
Balls bowled	384	22,655
Wickets	3	444
Bowling average	32.66	17.36
5 wickets in innings	0	32
10 wickets in match	0	9
Best bowling	2/35	8/40
Catches/stumpings	5/–	73/–
- Source: Cricinfo, 10 June 2011

Charles Thomas Studd, often known as C. T. Studd (2 December 1860 – 16 July 1931), was a British missionary, a contributor to The Fundamentals, and a cricketer.

As a British Anglican Christian missionary to China he was part of the Cambridge Seven and was responsible for setting up the Heart of Africa Mission which became the Worldwide Evangelisation Crusade (now WEC International). As a cricketer, he played for England in the 1882 match won by Australia, which was the origins of The Ashes. A poem he wrote, "Only One Life, 'Twill Soon Be Past", has become famous to many who are unaware of its author.

== Faith ==
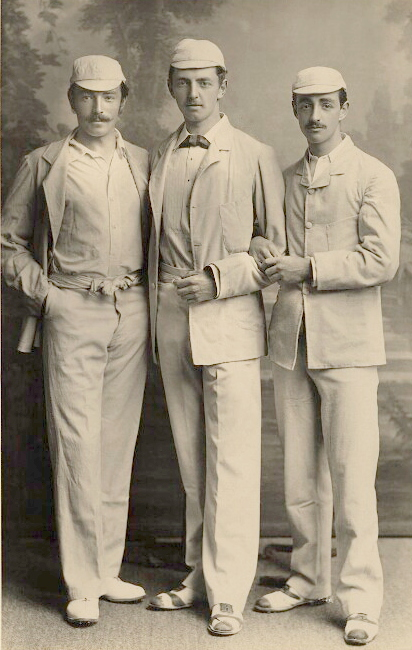
The three cricketing Studd brothers, Charles in the middle

Studd was a son of retired merchant Edward Studd. Edward became a Christian during a Dwight L. Moody and Ira D. Sankey revival meeting in England, and a visiting preacher to the Studd home, Tedworth House in Wiltshire, converted Charles and two of his brothers to the faith while they were students at Eton. According to his conversion narrative, the preacher asked him if he believed God's promises to give believers eternal life, and as Charles would only go so far as to profess he believed Jesus Christ died, the guest pressed the point, and Charles then believed on the Lord Jesus for salvation. Charles later recalled the moment:

"I got down on my knees and I did say 'thank you' to God. And right then and there joy and peace came into my soul. I knew then what it was to be 'born again,' and the Bible which had been so dry to me before, became everything."

Studd continued from Eton to Trinity College, Cambridge, where he graduated in 1883. In 1884 after his brother George was taken seriously ill Charles was confronted by the question, "What is all the fame and flattery worth ... when a man comes to face eternity?" He had to admit that since his conversion six years earlier he had been in "an unhappy backslidden state". As a result of the experience he said, "I know that cricket would not last, and honour would not last, and nothing in this world would last, but it was worthwhile living for the world to come."

Studd emphasised the life of faith, believing that God would provide for a Christian's needs. His father died while he was in China, and he gave away his inheritance of £29,000, specifying £5,000 to be used for the Moody Bible Institute, £5,000 for George Müller mission work and his orphans, £5,000 for George Holland's work with England's poor in Whitechapel, and £5,000 to Commissioner Frederick Booth-Tucker for the Salvation Army in India. For the rest of his life, he lived as a ‘faith missionary’, with no fundraising.

Studd believed that God's purposes could be confirmed through providential coincidences, such as a sum of money being donated spontaneously at just the right moment. He encouraged Christians to take risks in planning missionary ventures, trusting in God to provide. His spirituality was intense, and he mostly read only the Bible. Another work that influenced him was Hannah Whitall Smith's The Christian's Secret of a Happy Life. Although he believed that God sometimes healed physical illnesses through prayer and the anointing of oil, he also accepted that some ailments were chronic.

Studd also believed in plain speaking and muscular Christianity, and his call for Christians to embrace a "Don't Care a Damn" attitude to worldly things caused some scandal. He believed that missionary work was urgent and that those who were unevangelised would be condemned to hell.

== Cricketing career ==
Studd gained fame as a cricketer representing Cambridge University, Gentlemen of India and Middlesex. Charles was the youngest and best known of the three Studd brothers who played for Eton, Cambridge University and Middlesex. By the time he was 16 he had started to excel at cricket and at 19 was captain of his team at Eton College; after school he went to Trinity College, Cambridge, where he was also recognised as an outstanding cricketer.

=== Ashes, 1882 ===
Studd played in the original Test against Australia where The Ashes were first named and was one of the last two batsman in. When Studd went in, England needed 10 runs to win, but an eccentric performance by his batting partner Ted Peate led to the match being lost.

A week later, the relevant edition of the Sporting Times included a mock obituary which has assumed iconic status:

IN AFFECTIONATE REMEMBRANCE
OF ENGLISH CRICKET
WHICH DIED AT THE OVAL, 29 August 1882,
DEEPLY LAMENTED BY A LARGE CIRCLE OF
SORROWING FRIENDS AND ACQUAINTANCES

R.I.P.

N.B.-THE BODY WILL BE CREMATED AND THE
ASHES TAKEN TO AUSTRALIA.

Studd's fame lives on though through the inscription preserved on the Ashes urn to this day, which reads,

When Ivo goes back with the urn, the urn;
Studds, Steel, Read and Tylecote return, return;
The welkin will ring loud,
The great crowd will feel proud,
Seeing Barlow and Bates with the urn, the urn;
And the rest coming home with the urn.

Soon after, some lady supporters in Melbourne jokingly presented the English captain with an urn which they said contained the ashes of a cricket bail; this gave rise to the name of 'The Ashes'.

== Missionary work ==
Studd became an evangelist, and among those he influenced were Wilfred Grenfell and Frederick Brotherton Meyer. As a result of his brother's illness and the effect it had upon him, he decided to pursue his faith through missionary work in China. Of his missionary work, he said: "Some want to live within the sound of church or chapel bell; I want to run a rescue shop within a yard of hell".

=== China ===
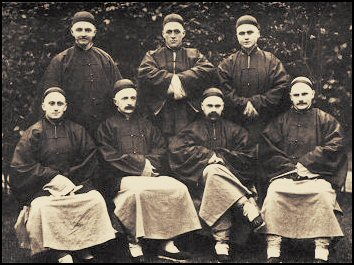
The Cambridge Seven

Studd was one of the "Cambridge Seven", a group of former Cambridge students who offered themselves to Hudson Taylor for missionary service at the China Inland Mission, leaving for there in February 1885. While in China, he married a fellow missionary Priscilla Livingstone Stewart in a ceremony performed by a Chinese pastor, and four daughters were born. Studd believed that God had given him daughters to educate the Chinese about the value of baby girls.

=== America ===
On returning to England he was invited to visit America where his brother Kynaston had recently arranged meetings which had led to the formation of the Student Volunteer Movement. Here, he also influenced John Mott.

=== India ===
Between 1900 and 1906, Studd was pastor of a church at Ootacamund in southern India. Although it was a different situation to the pioneer missionary work he had undertaken in China, his ministry was marked by numerous conversions amongst the British officials and the local community.

=== Africa ===
On his return from India, Studd met German missionary Karl Kumm, and he became concerned about the large parts of Africa that had never been reached with the Gospel. At this stage he was 50 years old and suffering from ill health stemming from typhoid fever. However, he decided to go against medical advice and work abroad again.

In 1910 he went to the Sudan with Church Missionary Society missionary Llewellyn Gwynne and was concerned by the lack of Christian faith in central Africa; out of this concern Studd was led to set up the Heart of Africa Mission. His speaking on the subject inspired Howard Mowll (Bishop of China, and later Archbishop of Sydney), Arthur Pitts-Pitts (of the Church Missionary Society in Kenya), and Graham Brown (Anglican Bishop of Jerusalem). As headquarters for the venture, the Studds chose 17 Highland Road in Upper Norwood, South London. Like Hudson Taylor, Studd believed that funds for the work should not be directly solicited. Finances were often tenuous, although he enjoyed the support of Lord Radstock.

Against medical advice, Studd first visited the Belgian Congo in 1913 in the company of Alfred Buxton, and he established four mission stations in an area then inhabited by eight tribes. Studd returned to England when Priscilla fell ill, but when he returned to the Congo in 1916 she had recovered sufficiently to undertake the expansion of the mission into the Worldwide Evangelisation Crusade with workers in South America, Central Asia and the Middle East as well as Africa. Supported by his wife's work at home, Studd built up an extensive missionary outreach based on his centre at Ibambi in Budu territory. Priscilla made a short visit to the Congo in 1928, which was the last time they met; she died the following year. Studd was joined in his work by his daughter Pauline and son-in-law Norman Grubb, and his grandson Noel Grubb, who died on his first birthday and is buried at Nala, Democratic Republic of the Congo. Studd's daughter Edith married Buxton.

On 16 July 1931, still labouring for the Lord at Ibambi at age 70, Charles Studd died from untreated gallstones.

== Legacy ==
Studd's vision for China, India and Africa was maintained by Norman Grubb, who spent some 15 years in China and six in India on his missionary work. He devoted the rest of his life to spreading the Gospel message in Africa, founding the Worldwide Evangelisation Crusade (now WEC International).

== Family ==
=== Studd brothers ===
- Kynaston Studd
- George Studd

=== Wife ===
In 1888, he married Priscilla Livingstone Stewart, and their marriage produced four daughters, and two sons (who died in infancy).

=== Daughters ===
- Salvation Grace Faith Studd (born 1889) married Martin Sutton and, after his death, LtCol David C D Munro
- Dorothy Catherine Topsy Studd (born 1891) married the Rev Gilbert A Barclay
- Edith Crossley Mary Studd (born 1892) married Alfred Buxton who worked in Ethiopia
- Pauline Evangeline Priscilla Studd (born 1894), known as 'Ma Ru', married Lieut Norman Grubb

== Books and poems ==
Studd wrote several books, including

- The Chocolate Soldier, or, Heroism: The Lost Chord of Christianity (1912)
- Christ's Etceteras (1915)
- Quaint Rhymes for the Battlefield
- Fool or Fanatic
- Gentlemanliness
- Lembo na kubikisa
- Boys and Boys (contributor)

Studd's essay "The Personal Testimony of Charles T. Studd" became part of the historic collection The Fundamentals: A Testimony To The Truth, R. A. Torrey and A. C. Dixon. Studd continues to be best remembered by some for the poem, "Only One Life, 'Twill Soon Be Past". Its memorable verse states:

Only one life 'twill soon be past.
Only what's done for Christ will last.

This poem inspired the song "Only One Life" written by Lanny Wolfe in 1973.

== Influence ==
To this day, his name remains linked with the evangelisation of the Congo Basin, and in 1930 he was made a Chevalier of the Royal Order of the Lion by Albert I, King of the Belgians. His biography by Norman Grubb was exceptionally popular, and some of his own writings are still in print. A song, Fearless (by Building 429) was created in memory of C.T. Studd's work as a missionary.

== See also ==
- List of Protestant missionaries in China
- Protestant missions in China
- Christianity in China
- Historical Bibliography of the China Inland Mission
