= Edward Studd (cricketer, born 1878) =

English cricketer

Personal information
- Born: 20 October 1878; Tirhoot, India
- Died: 2 March 1951 (aged 72); Cheltenham, Gloucestershire
- Batting: Right-handed

Domestic team information
- Years: Team
- 1917-1919: Gloucestershire
- Source: ESPNcricinfo, 27 March 2014

Edward Studd (20 October 1878 – 2 March 1951) was an English cricketer. He played for Gloucestershire between 1917 and 1919.
