= WEC International =

Christian organization

- Founded: 1913
- Founder: C. T. Studd
- Type: Evangelical Missions Agency
- Purpose: where there is no church
- Location: International HQ in Singapore
- Origins: Belgian Congo
- Region served: over 80 countries
- Members: over 1,800
- Employees: nil
- Website: WEC's international site.

WEC International is an interdenominational mission agency of evangelical tradition which focuses on evangelism, discipleship and church planting, through music and the arts, serving addicts and vulnerable children, through Christian education, missionary and church leadership training, medical and development work, Bible translation, literacy and media production, in order to help local Christians share the gospel cross-culturally. WEC emphasises the importance of shared life in a local church as a vital expression of Christian life. WEC prioritises the planting of churches among indigenous people groups and unreached people groups, who have little or no access to the Christian gospel.

== History ==
WEC was founded in 1913 by Charles Studd (CT), the cricketer turned missionary. Studd was one of the Cambridge Band also called Cambridge Seven—seven members of Cambridge University who offered themselves for service under the China Inland Mission as a result of a visit by the American evangelist D.L. Moody to the campus in 1884. Studd spent several years in China and a time in India before going on in his fifties to establish and lead the "Heart of Africa" Mission (HAM). Although broken in health, Studd said, "If Jesus Christ be God and died for me, then no sacrifice can be too great for me to make for Him." Later, recognising some misunderstandings with using the word "crusade", the mission was renamed as Worldwide Evangelisation for Christ (WEC International). The Heart of Africa Mission/WEC International was started as part of what missiologists call "The Second Wave—Interdenominational missions to the continental heartlands (1865–1910) (the First Wave being denominational missions to the continental coastlands (1792–1865)

The Heart of Africa Mission was changed to Worldwide Evangelization Crusade (WEC) in 1919 when Mr. Gilbert Barclay, who married Studd's daughter Dorothy, became Home Overseer. He took the position on the condition that the organization have a worldwide title, scope and work. (As C.T. Studd believed God told him, on his way to Congo, "This journey is not just for Africa but for the whole unevangelised world.") Recruitment of missionaries began immediately and in 1921 WEC entered Amazonia. WEC was the parent organization and individual fields were permitted to retain their own subtitles, so the new field became Heart of Amazonia. By the time of Studd's death, the Amazonia field had 16 missionaries with headquarters and mission stations in three people groups. 'Little Tibet' (Kashmir) was entered next, then Arabia, followed by West Africa (Spanish Guinea), and then Colombia, South America

A branch of WEC International was formed in the U.S. in 1939 and is located in Fort Washington, PA.

The Heart of Africa Mission was begun in northern Congo in 1913 by Charles Thomas Studd and Alfred Barclay Buxton, beginning at Niangara on the banks of the Uele River.

After the death of the founder in 1931, his missionary colleague Norman Percy Grubb was appointed General Secretary (leader). Grubb built the mission up from 30 missionaries to 800 in 20 countries and encouraged the establishment of the Christian Literature Crusade as a sister mission in 1941. After retirement in 1965, Grubb lived at the WEC US headquarters in Ft. Washington, PA, writing extensively and traveling from there until his death in 1993.

In 1941 the Christian Literature Crusade was begun out of the ministry of WEC by Kenneth Adams. It aimed to open Christian book centers in all lands where there was a call for them and to serve existing churches and missions with Christian literature, as well as Gospel Literature Worldwide, Radio Worldwide, and a Survey and Research Department.

WEC has been influential in the movement for countries once known as 'missionary-receiving' lands to become 'missionary-sending' lands. WEC International missionary Leslie Brierley visited Brazil in 1962 to survey that land for its missionary-sending potential. Later, in 1972–73, he and Bob Harvey, also of WEC, began touring Brazil giving seminars promoting the idea. The idea has since matured in Brazil and spread to many other countries. Many indigenous mission agencies were formed as a result, and Brierley formed a "global strategy for launching mission movements in non-Western countries."

Another WEC missionary, Dr Phyllis Kilbourn, launched a branch ministry of WEC called "Rainbows of Hope", providing training for Christians to work among children at risk around the world. This grew out of her seeing the devastating effects of the 1990-1997 civil war in Liberia on the children of that country. She later started Crisis Care Training International as another department of WEC to offer training for Christian workers dealing with children in crisis.

Teachers from the WEC have been known to work at other Christian schools, and in Indonesia in 1972, their organization was named the World Evangelization Crusade.

== WEC today ==
WEC's international headquarters are in Chiang Mai, Thailand, and the current International Directors are KyungNam Park and KyoungA Cho.

== Policy ==
C.T. Studd, the founder of WEC, said their objective is "The evangelization of all the unevangelized regions of the world."

More recently, the purpose of the organization was listed as "To bring the gospel to the remaining unevangelized peoples with the utmost urgency, to demonstrate the compassion of Christ to a needy world, and to inspire, mobilize and train for cross-cultural mission."

Norman Grubb, the successor to C.T. Studd in Congo, wrote that the mission made no appeals for funds, took no offerings at meetings, guaranteed missionaries no fixed salaries, and incurred no debt from the beginning. Funds that were received were divided equally among the missionaries. Neither C.T. Studd nor his wife ever took any money from the mission.

== See also ==
- Operation World
