= The Ashes urn =

Terracotta urn used as a cricket trophy

The Ashes Urn
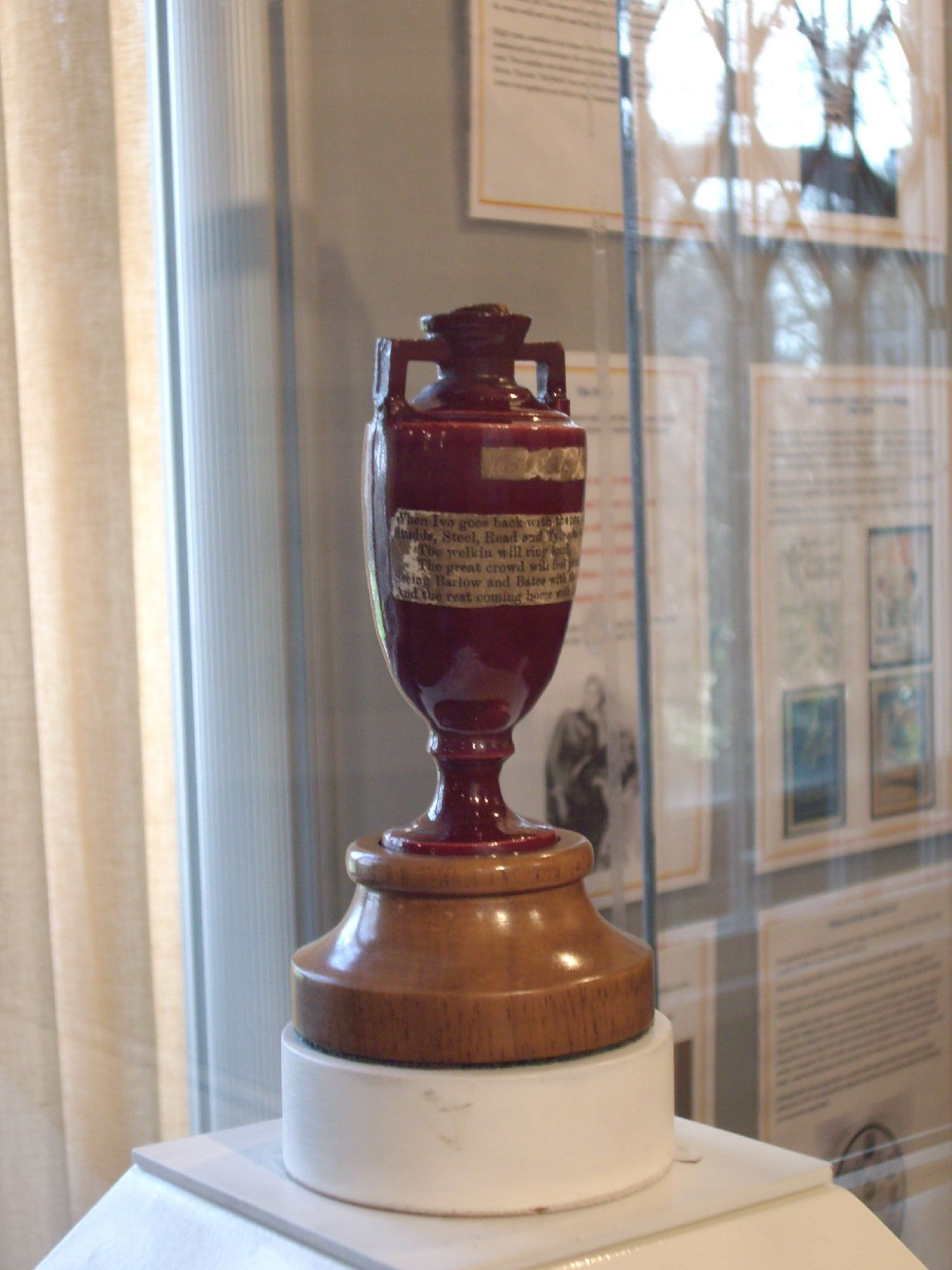
- The Ashes urn on display at Lord's
- Sport: Cricket
- Awarded for: Winning the Ashes
- Country: Australia; England
- Presented by: Cricket Australia; ECB

History
- First award: 1882–83
- Editions: 74 (as of 2026)
- First winner: Australia
- Most wins: Australia (35 series wins)
- Most recent: Australia (2025–26)
- Website: lords.org

The Ashes urn is a small urn made of terracotta and standing 10.5 cm (4.1 inches) high, long believed to contain the ashes of a cricket bail or the burnt remains of a lady's veil. It was presented to Ivo Bligh, the captain of the England cricket team, as a personal gift after a friendly match hosted at Rupertswood mansion in Sunbury during the 1882–83 tour in Australia. After his death the urn was presented to the Marylebone Cricket Club, which has it on display at Lord's cricket ground in London. The urn has come to be strongly associated with "The Ashes", the prize for which England and Australia are said to compete in Test series between the two countries.

== History ==
=== Origins ===
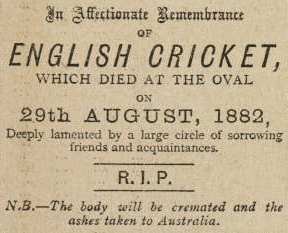
The death notice that appeared in The Sporting Times

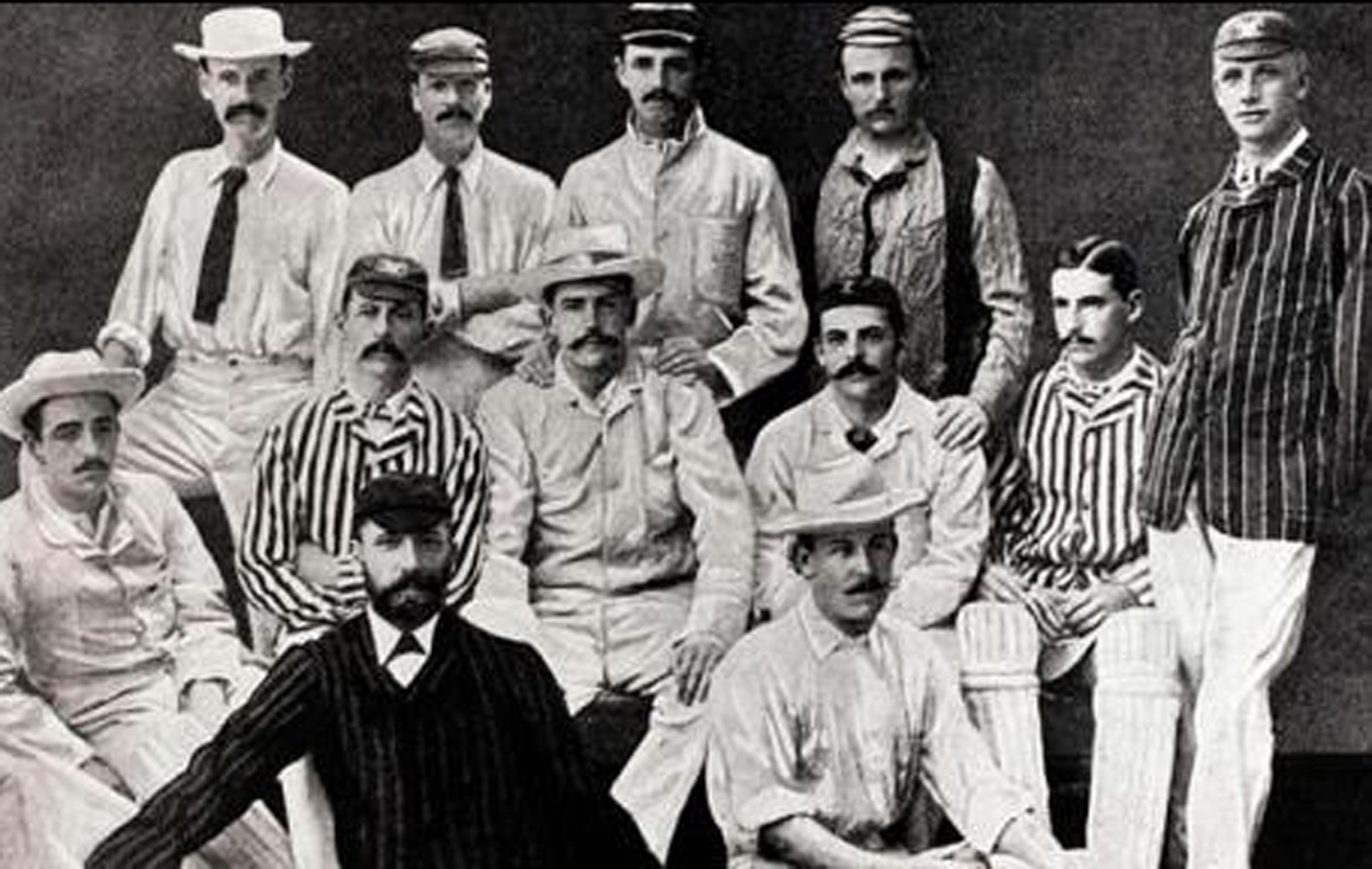
The English Cricket Team that toured Australia in 1882–83. They were captained by Ivo Bligh. Standing: William Barnes, Frederick Morley, Charles Thomas Studd, George Frederick Vernon, Charles Frederick Henry Leslie. Centre Row: George Browne Studd, Edward Ferdinando Sutton Tylecote, Ivo Bligh (captain), Allan Gibson Steel, Walter William Read. Front Row: Richard Gorton Barlow, Willie Bates.

On 29 August 1882 Australia defeated England in a cricket match played at Kennington Oval, London. There was a great deal of dismay felt by the English about this loss and a few days later a mock obituary notice written by Reginald Shirley Brooks appeared in the Sporting Times which read:

In Affectionate Remembrance of English Cricket which died at the Oval on 29th August, 1882, Deeply lamented by a large circle of sorrowing friends and acquaintances. R.I.P. N.B.—The body will be cremated and the ashes taken to Australia.

It was the first time the term "the ashes" had been mentioned.

It was arranged that a cricket team captained by Ivo Bligh would tour Australia in 1882–83 and this team became the English hope of victory. Before leaving England for Australia, Bligh pledged to bring back "The Ashes of English cricket".

Three main Test matches were played. The first was in Melbourne and was won by Australia. The second was also in Melbourne and won by the English. The third match was in Sydney and was again won by the English. After this it was generally acknowledged that the English were the victors. After the conclusion of the Test series, a match was played in Sydney in which a United Australian Eleven defeated The Hon. Ivo Bligh's Eleven by four wickets. This seems to have given rise in Melbourne to some debate about whether it should have counted as a Fourth Test. However, The Sydney Morning Herald made it very clear that this game was not part of the international "rubber" which had in fact been won by England. There were also other matches played between the English and the individual Colonies' cricket teams over the tour.

The urn was made during the 1882–83 tour. It is a very small red terracotta artefact which some believe could be a perfume bottle. Two labels are pasted on it: the top label says "The Ashes"; the lower label is a verse cut out from Melbourne Punch magazine of 1 February 1883 which reads:

When Ivo goes back with the urn, the urn;
Studds, Steel, Read and Tylecote return, return;
The welkin will ring loud,
The great crowd will feel proud,
Seeing Barlow and Bates with the urn, the urn;
And the rest coming home with the urn.

These names are some of the men in the English team.

There is also an associated red velvet bag with a Victor's Olive Crown embroidered on it in yellow silk cotton with the emblem "1883" in the middle of it. This bag was made by Anne Fletcher, wife of the manager of the NSW team, in early 1883.

=== The presentation of the urn ===
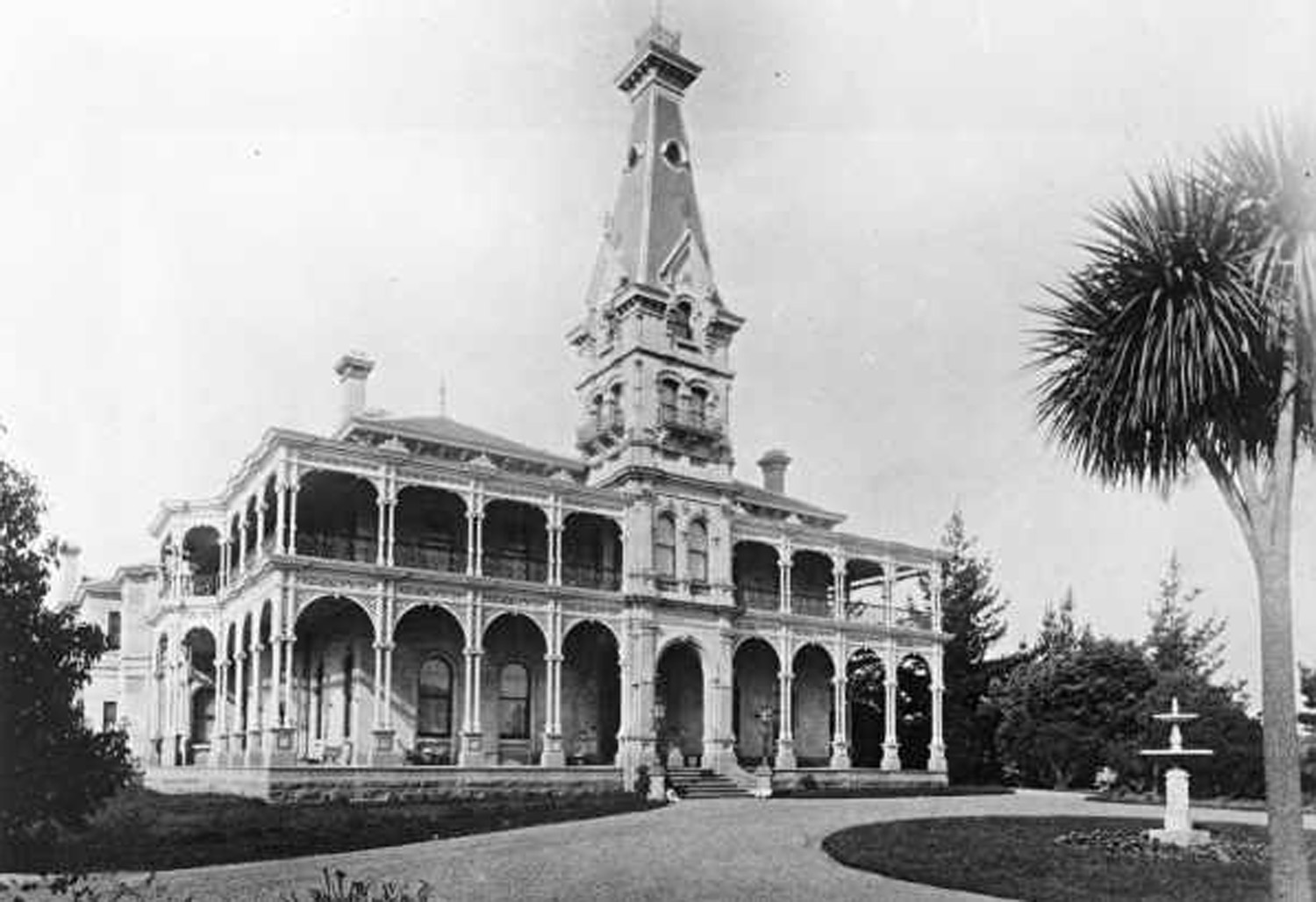
Rupertswood, where the Ashes urn originated

Reports have established that the estate of Rupertswood in Sunbury, Victoria, is the birthplace of the Ashes urn legend. According to a 1908 newspaper report in the Hobart Mercury, an unnamed writer from the Westminster Gazette recalled that a group of Melbourne ladies which included Janet, Lady Clarke, and Florence Morphy, presented "a tiny silver urn, containing what they termed 'the ashes of Australian (sic) cricket.'" to The Hon. Ivo Bligh, captain of the English touring team after one of the three Tests in 1882–83.

Rupertswood was the home of Sir William Clarke and Janet, Lady Clarke. Sir William was president of the Melbourne Cricket Club. At Christmas 1882 and again at Easter 1883, the members of the English cricket team were his guests.

A divergent story about the presentation of the urn is that on Christmas Eve, prior to the start of the three-test series, and after a friendly match between the English cricketers and a combination of staff and guests held at Rupertswood, the urn was presented by Lady Clarke to Bligh in a joking fashion. Also present on this occasion was the Clarkes' music teacher, Florence Morphy, who was later to marry Ivo Bligh. There has been some disagreement with this version of events mainly because of three issues. Firstly the verse on the urn was not published in Punch until 1 February 1883 which is five weeks after the Christmas event. Secondly there are statements by both Lord Darnley and Lady Darnley that the presentation happened sometime after the Third Test. The Third Test finished in Sydney on 30 January 1883. Thirdly the accompanying red velvet bag made by Mrs. Anne Fletcher, was not made until early 1883.

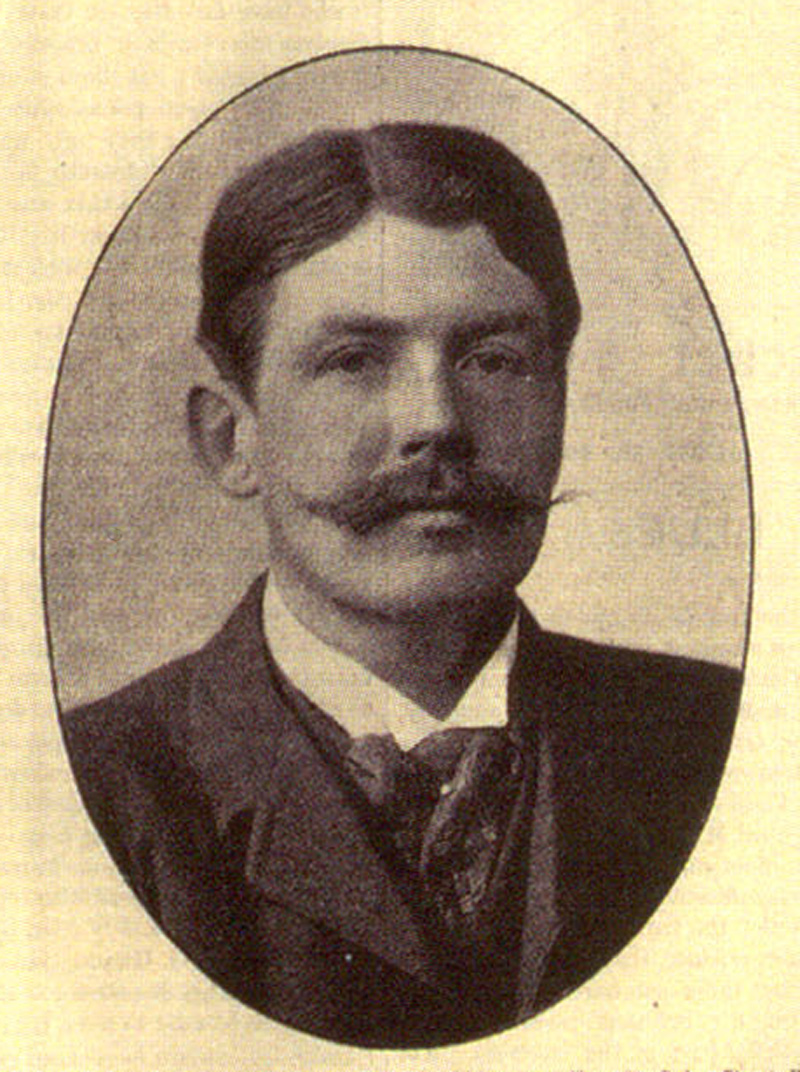
Ivo Bligh (later Lord Darnley), who was the recipient of the Ashes urn

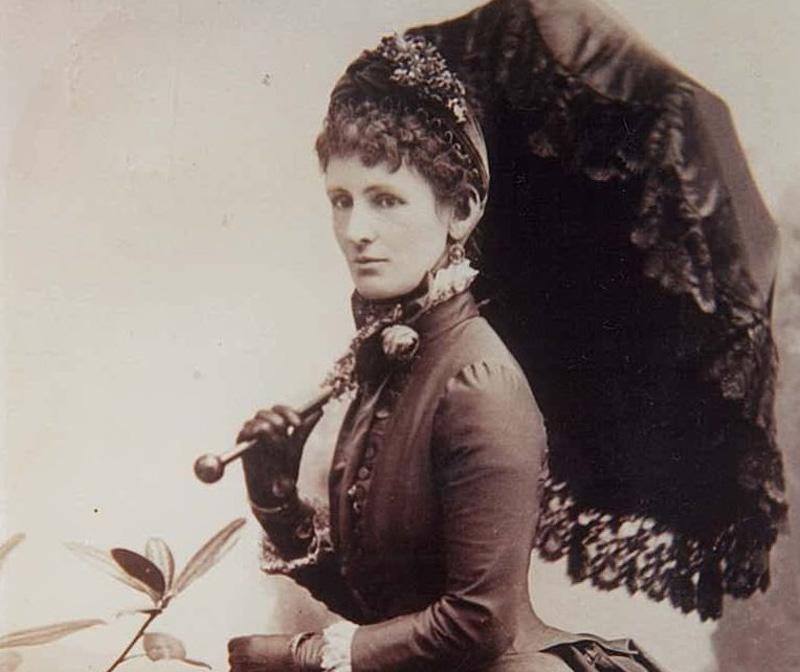
Janet, Lady Clarke, one of the women who presented the urn to Bligh

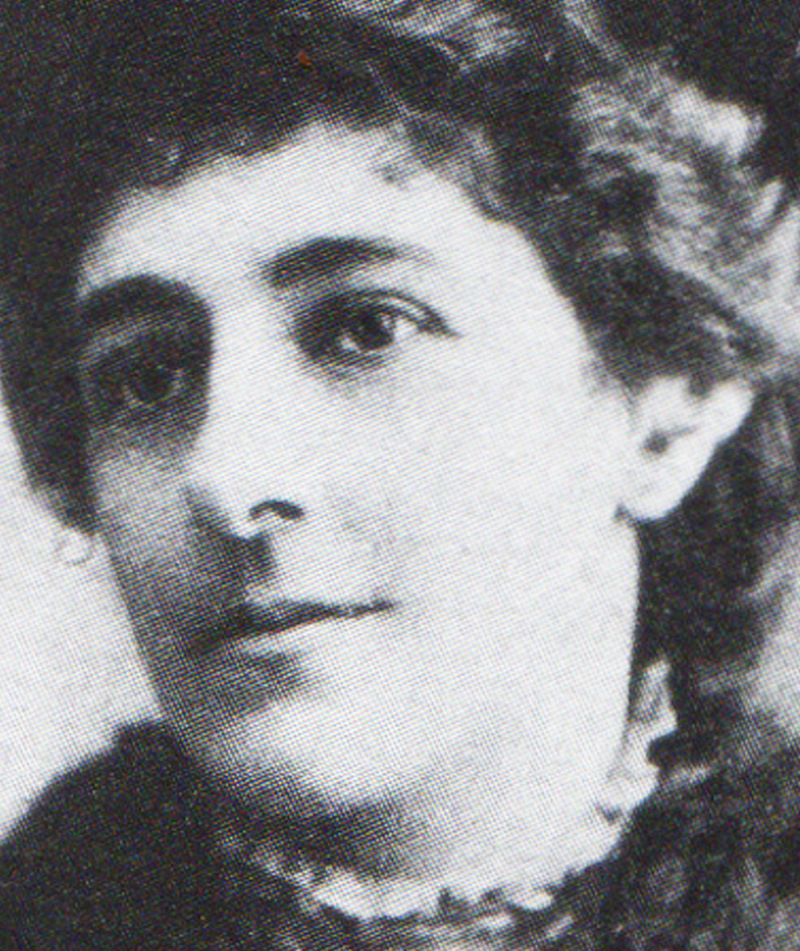
Florence Morphy (later Lady Darnley), who also presented the Ashes urn to Bligh

One theory, described by Joy Munns, is that there were two quite separate presentations of the same urn. It was presented firstly at Rupertswood at Christmas and was merely the perpetuation of a joke. The second and most documented event was at Easter (which was around 25 March 1883) at Rupertswood after all the formal matches had finished. On this occasion Joy Munns says the verse was pasted on the urn, it was placed in the red velvet bag and given to Bligh. Lady Clarke and Florence Morphy were both present on this occasion. This version of the presentation being in late March is supported by a statement made by Lord Darnley who said in 1921 that he was presented with the urn by "some ladies of Melbourne after the final defeat of his team". England in fact won the series 2–1. Bligh's "final defeat" refers to a non-Test game in Melbourne on 12 March 1883 when they were defeated by the Victorian cricket team in the last formal match of the tour.

Over Easter many of the English team were guests at Rupertswood and did not embark on the return voyage to England until 29 March. Ivo Bligh stayed for another five weeks during which time it is believed he became engaged to Florence Morphy. He sailed for England on 5 May but returned to Australia in February 1884. Four days after his arrival, on 9 February, he married Florence at St Mary's Church in Sunbury. The wedding breakfast was a very lavish affair at Rupertswood.

=== Ivo Bligh's ownership ===
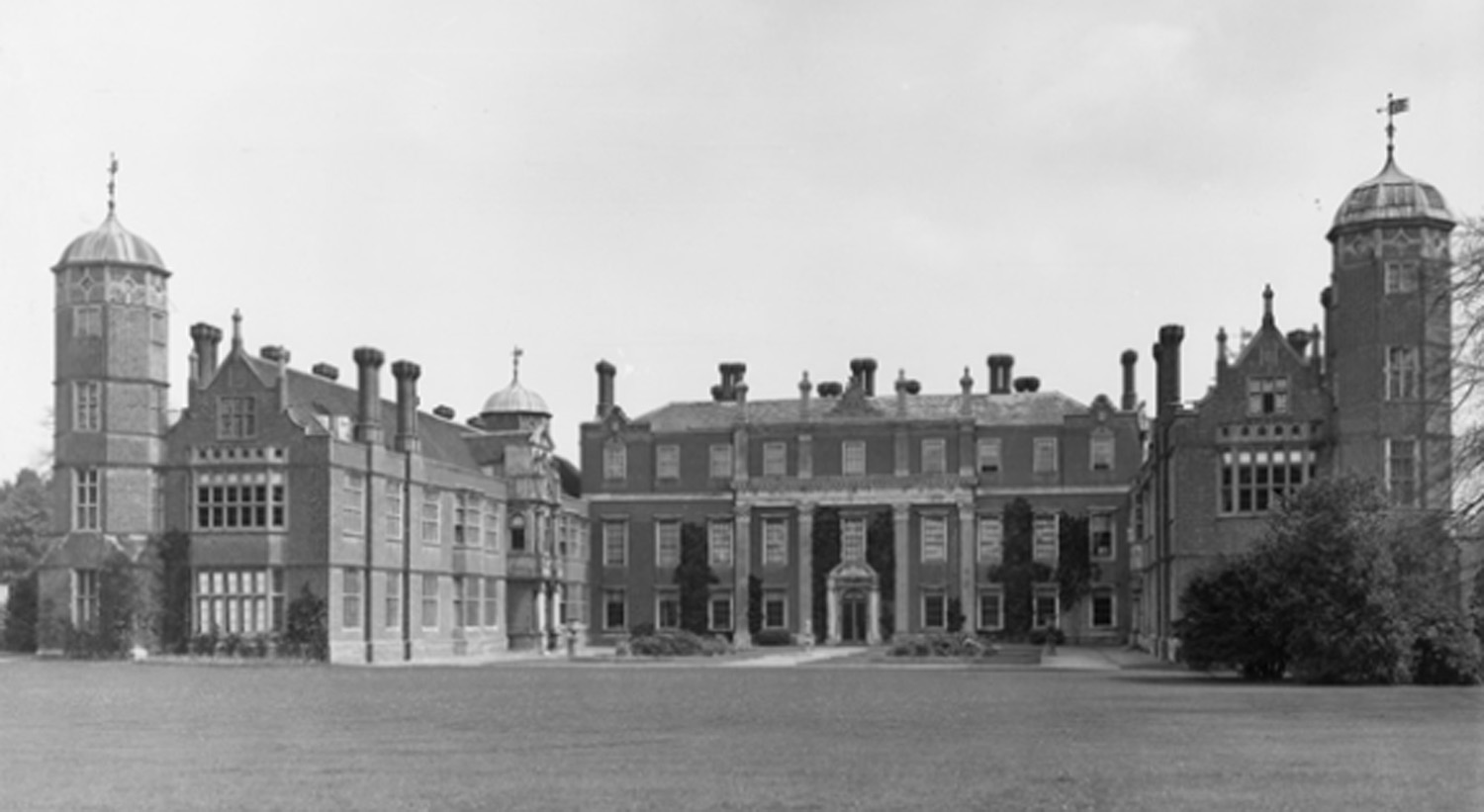
Cobham Hall c. 1904. This was where the Ashes urn was kept until about 1927.

After their honeymoon in Australia, the couple went to England in August 1884, where they stayed at Cobham Hall in Kent. The English papers reported that Florence was warmly welcomed by the Bligh family on her arrival. They remained in England for the next 18 months and then returned to Melbourne in January 1886. It was reported at this time that they intended to stay in Australia for about one year because of Ivo Bligh's health.

In Melbourne they lived in a house called Hazelwell in Powlett St East Melbourne and in November 1886 Florence had her first child. In March 1887 the couple returned to England and for some time lived at Cobham Hall. In 1890 Bligh had a position in the wine merchant firm of Morgan Brothers.

In 1900, after the death of his brother, Bligh became the Earl of Darnley and inherited Cobham Hall. The Ashes urn remained at the Hall until Bligh's death in 1927.

Lord Darnley had an interview in 1921 with Montague Grover, a well-known Australian journalist, at his home in Cobham Hall. Grover says that the urn was kept in Darnley's den where all his other treasured cricket memorabilia were placed. He had numerous photos of the other team players on the wall as well as a leather-bound copy of the original account of the 1882–83 cricket tour of Australia.

=== Marylebone Cricket Club ===
After Bligh's death, Florence presented the urn to the Marylebone Cricket Club in 1929. It was placed in the Long Room at the Lord's Pavilion until 1953, when it was transferred to the Cricket Museum next to the Pavilion.

After the urn was first displayed at Lord's, it produced a gradual change in the public perception of "The Ashes". In 1933, it was displayed in the National Sporting Trophies Exhibition in London with some of the world's great sporting memorabilia. To the public the urn was becoming the image and symbol of "The Ashes".

Since 1929, the urn has returned to Australia only three times– once when it was brought to Sydney for the Bicentenary Test Match in 1988 and secondly in 2006 for the tour of the Ashes Exhibition to each state capital of Australia. In December 2019 it returned to Australia for three months, where it was part of the "Velvet, Iron, Ashes" exhibition at the State Library Victoria.

It was not until after about 1950 that cricket books almost exclusively used representation of the urn to depict "The Ashes". From about 1989, images of the Australian Test cricketers with replicas of the urn appeared in the media.

== Women's Ashes Trophy ==
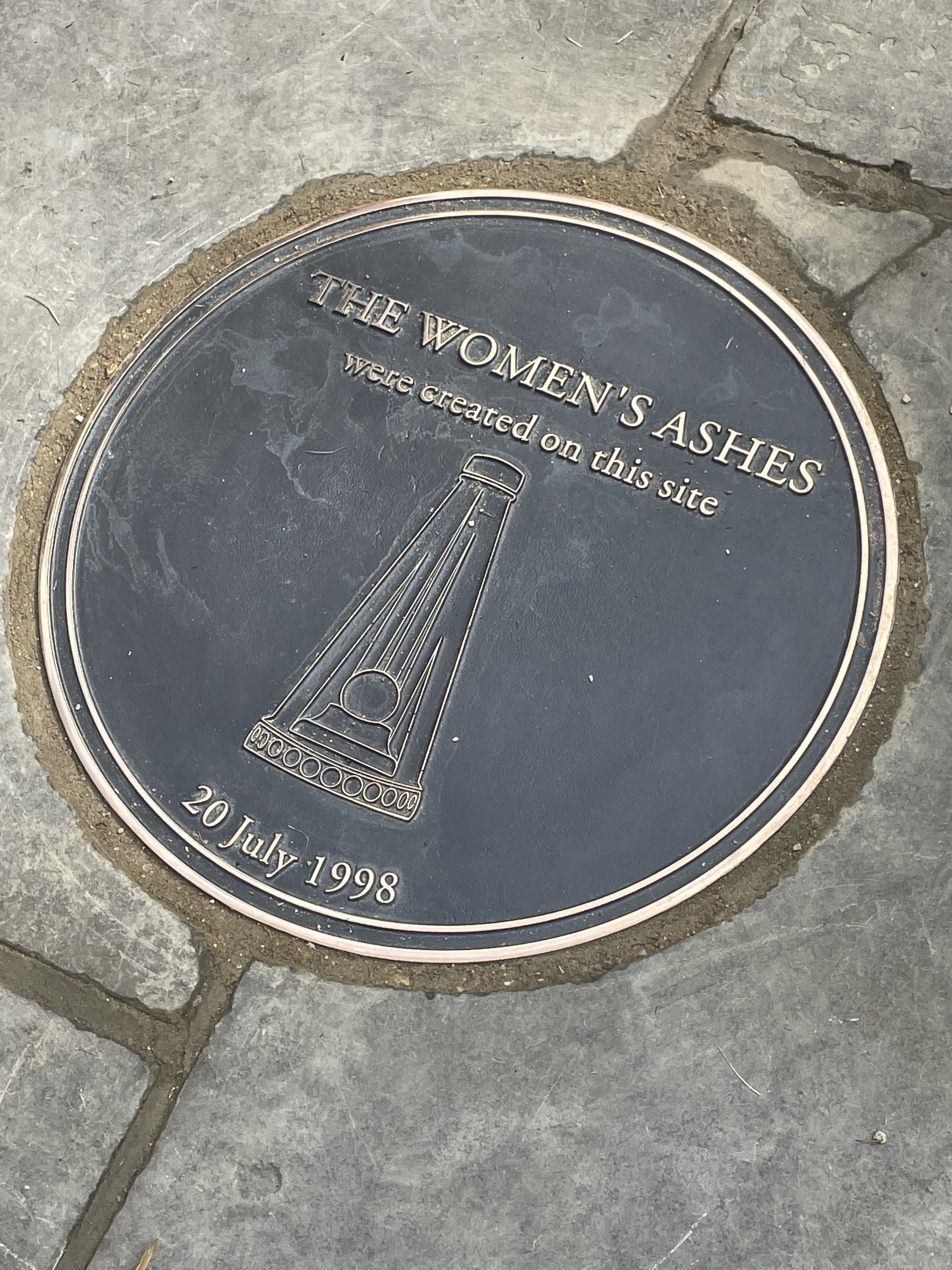
The plaque commemorating the Women's Ashes trophy creation at Lord's.

Despite the Australian and English women's teams having first played against each other in 1934, until 1998 there was no trophy for the series between the two nations. The brainchild of longterm manager of the English side, Norma Izard and inspired by the men's trophy. A yew tree trophy was designed in the shape of a ball. On 20 July 1998, during Australia's tour of England, a bat signed by both teams, along with a copy of the Laws of Cricket and the Women's Cricket Association constitution were burnt at Lord's, with the ashes placed in the trophy.

== Gallery ==
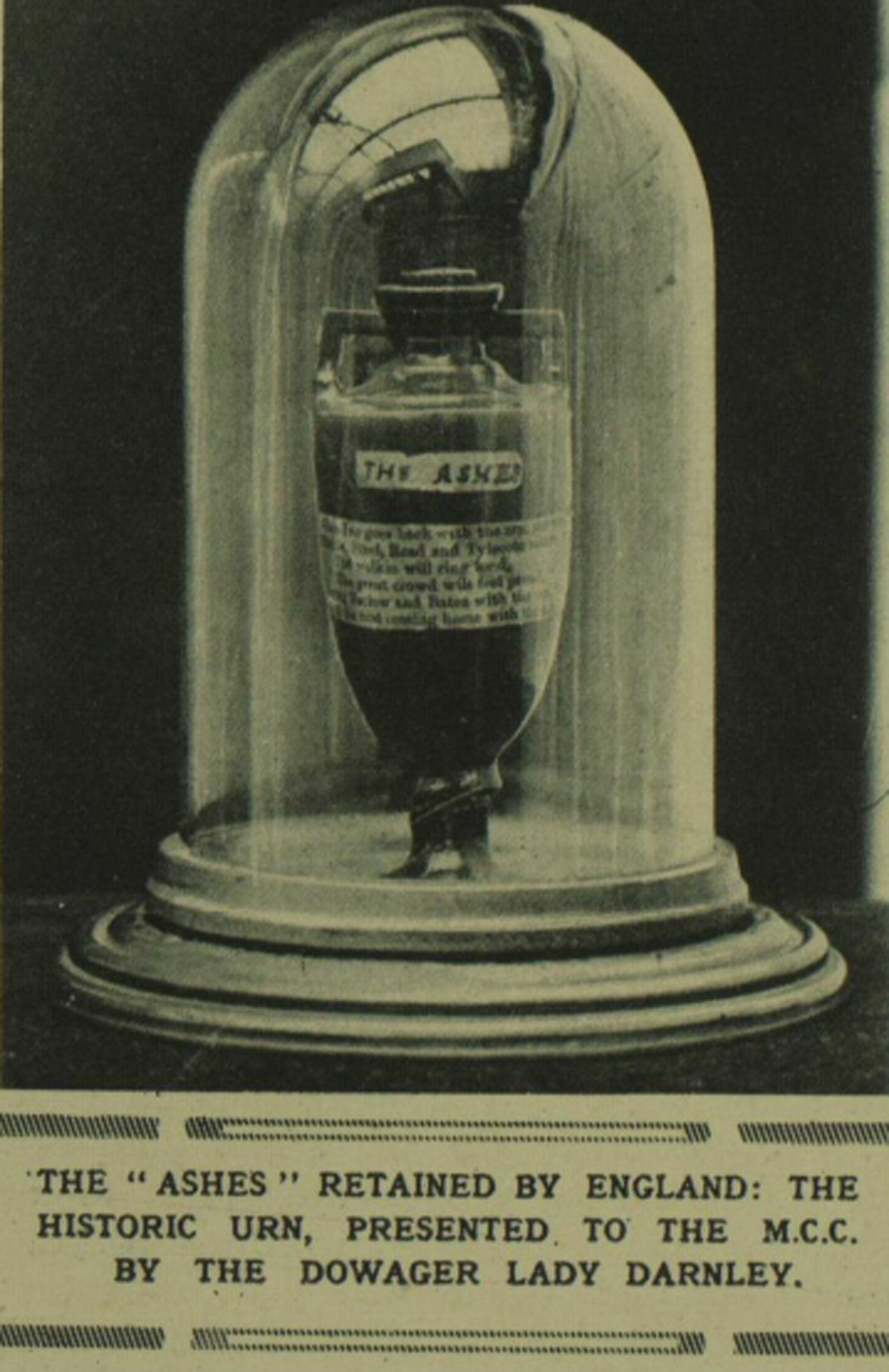
The Ashes urn in 1929, when it was in the Long Room of the Lord's Pavilion

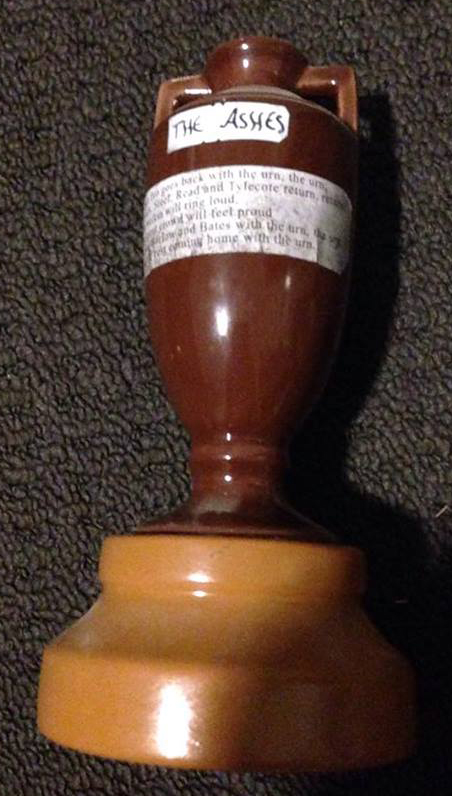
A modern-day replica of the Ashes Urn

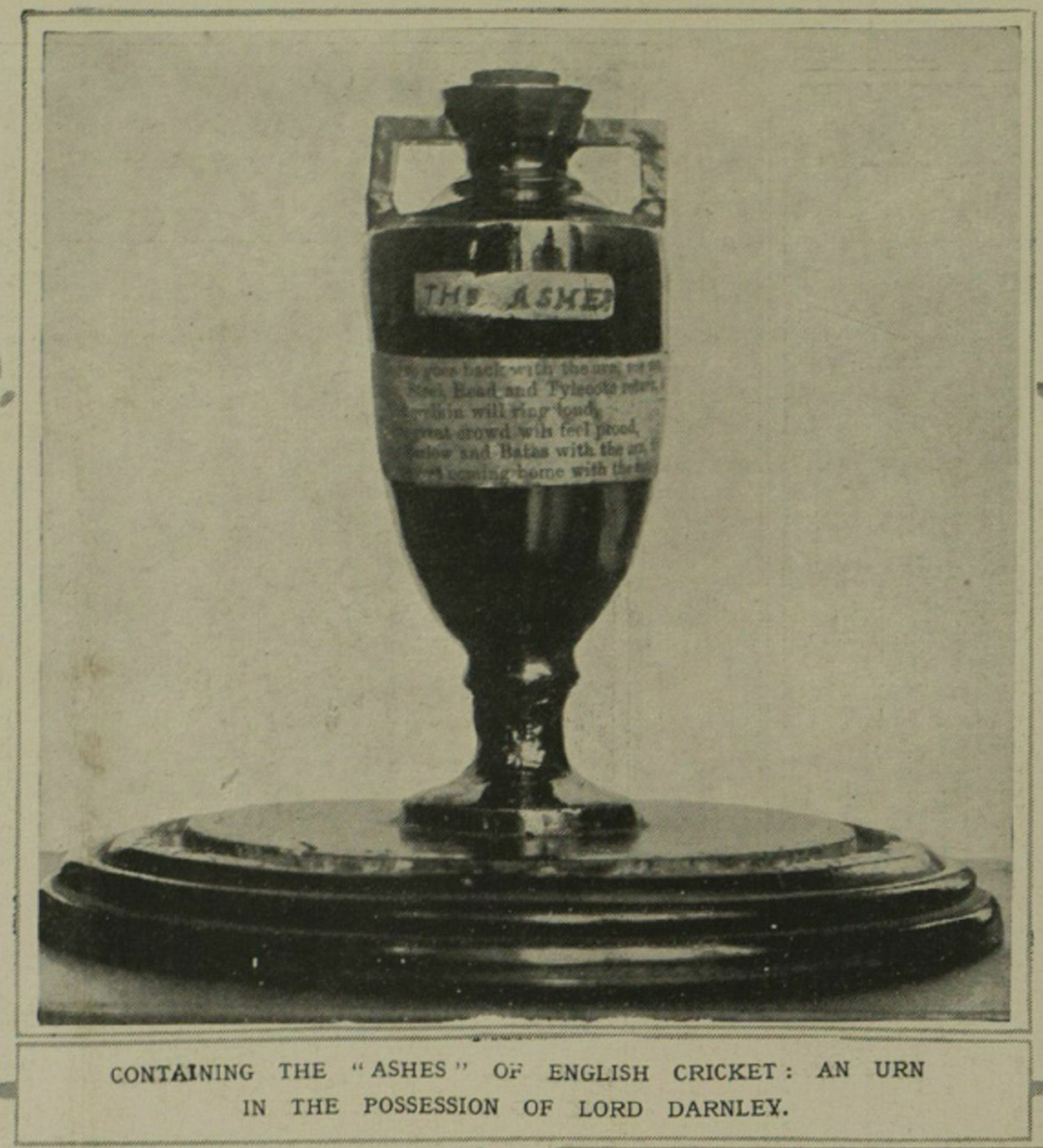
The Ashes urn in 1921, when it was still owned by Lord Darnley (Ivo Bligh)
