= Studd Trophy =

Athletics award at Royal Polytechnic Institution

The Studd Challenge Trophy was presented annually from 1898 for the best performance by a Royal Polytechnic Institution athlete during the previous year.

== History ==
The winners' names are engraved in marble on the staircase wall at the back of the Regent Street foyer of what is now the headquarters of the University of Westminster. Many of the Studd Trophy winners were Olympic or national champions in their particular sport. The trophy is named after Sir John Edward Kynaston Studd.

== Winners ==
- Frank Parks (1875–1945) in 1902.
- Willie Applegarth in 1912–13
- Albert Hill in 1919–20
- Harry Edward in 1922
- Jack London in 1928
- Alan Pascoe in 1971, 1972, 1973, 1974, 1975
