= Norman Grubb =

Serial Christian mission entrepreneur, writer, theologian and teacher

- Missionary, writer and teacher
- Born: 2 August 1895; London
- Died: 15 December 1993 (aged 98); Fort Washington, Pennsylvania

Norman Percy Grubb MC (2 August 1895 – 15 December 1993) was a British Christian missionary and Evangelist, writer, and theological teacher.

== Biography ==
=== Early life ===
Grubb was born in Hampstead, England, the son of an Anglican vicar. His brother Kenneth Grubb was born in 1900; Kenneth went on to become a missionary, director of a government department and president of the Church Missionary Society.

Norman Grubb was educated at Marlborough College, an English Public School before joining the British Army as a lieutenant in World War I. He received the Military Cross for meritorious action. After the war, in which he was wounded in one leg, he went to Trinity College, Cambridge. Later he married Pauline Studd, the daughter of the famous British cricketer and missionary to Africa C.T. Studd. He left for the Belgian Congo with Pauline in 1920 to follow in the footsteps of his father-in-law, having not yet completed his final term at Cambridge.

=== Missionary work and beliefs ===
Despite having a Christian upbringing it was only at the age of eighteen that Grubb seriously began to consider what it meant to be a Christian. It was a conversation with a family friend that challenged him to think more deeply about his faith, and from that point on he became committed to evangelistic work.

While recovering from his bullet wound in 1917 Grubb was handed a tract about the Heart of Africa Mission and the work of C.T. Studd in the Belgian Congo. After reading this tract he felt a calling to join Studd in his missionary activities.

Before setting out for Africa, however, Grubb studied for a while at Cambridge, where he had the vision for the Inter-Varsity Fellowship of Evangelical Unions (IVF) (now the Universities and Colleges Christian Fellowship) whose primary goal was the sharing of the Christian message with other students.

Before finishing his studies at Cambridge Grubb met Pauline Studd and became engaged to her. During their engagement, however, a dispute arose between them regarding Norman telling her that he loved God more than he loved her. The disagreement almost resulted in Pauline calling off the wedding. Fortunately the two were reconciled to one another when Pauline came to accept Grubb's dedication to serving his God, even though it meant that she would have to take second place in her husband's life.

In 1920 the newlyweds left for the Congo. They spent ten years there, working with C.T. Studd in evangelising the Africans. While there he translated the New Testament into Bangala. He was also struck by the words of Galatians 2:20: "I am crucified with Christ, nevertheless I live, yet not I, but Christ liveth within me, and the life I now live in the flesh I live by the faith of the Son of God, who loved me, and gave Himself for me". This verse was to become central to his philosophy. The kernel of his Christian belief was Jesus Christ's teaching that He is the vine and we are the branches (John 15), and that Christians are new creations in Him and therefore exist in union with him.

Before C.T. Studd's death in 1931 Norman and Pauline returned to England, where they ran the mission from its London headquarters. In the book Samuel Rees Howells: A Life of Intercession, Norman explains what happened when C.T. Studd died: "When C.T. Studd died in 1931 we were in a helpless condition. That month we had thirty-five missionaries and we had one pound a week for that month. That was all we had! People said to us, 'You’d better give up. Your founder is dead, the mission is so weak, give up.' But we learned, mainly through Rees Howells, to change our whole attitude and the Lord told us not to give up. The Lord talked to us about going to the world and we laughed. Here we were two missionaries at home, thirty-five starving missionaries on the field and the Lord is speaking to us about going to the world! How does anything get done? By faith of course! Faith is the ability, inspired by the Spirit, to believe something offered to you. It isn’t I doing it, it is Him doing it".

After Studd's death in 1931, it was learned that he had left a letter appointing Grubb as president of the ministry he had founded, World Evangelisation Crusade (W.E.C., WEC International), in place of himself. Grubb however thought it would be better to be called secretary instead. W.E.C. grew from one mission field with 35 workers to a worldwide mission operating in over 40 fields with thousands of workers from around the world, all living according to the principle that all needs will be supplied by God with no appeals to man. The mission continues to this day under the name of Worldwide Evangelization for Christ.

=== Writing ===
During his time as the General Secretary of WEC, Grubb began writing. To begin with he produced tracts and magazines for the mission, and then in 1933 he published a biography of C.T. Studd: C. T. Studd: Cricketer & Pioneer. After this came a string of other books, including his autobiography Once Caught, No Escape, and the pamphlet The Key to Everything. Other books include Continuous Revival, Touching the Invisible, Rees Howells' Intercessor, Law of Faith, Modern Viking, The Liberating Secret, The Deep Things of God, God Unlimited, Spontaneous You, Who Am I?, and Yes I Am.

Three books of Grubb's letters, including Knight of Faith, Vols. 1 & 2, and My Dear C.U.M.B.: Norman Grubb's Letters to the Cambridge University Missionary Band 1922-1989, The Japan Talks, The Meaning of Life, Think on These Things, Old Testament Journeys of Faith...their lives AND our lives, and Hearts Set Free have been published since his death. All are listed on www.normangrubb.com.

=== Retirement ===
Upon retiring from the position of International Secretary for WEC in 1965, he travelled, mostly around England and the United States, preaching Paul's "mystery of the gospel, which is Christ in you" in churches and conferences and to anyone who would listen. He carried on this work until his death.

== Family ==
Grubb married Pauline Studd and they had four children, Noel, Paul, Priscilla and Daniel.

Pauline had died in 1981.

=== Death ===
Grubb died on 15 December 1993, at the age of 98, at his home in Ft. Washington, Pennsylvania.

His papers are held at Wheaton College.
