= Tedworth House =

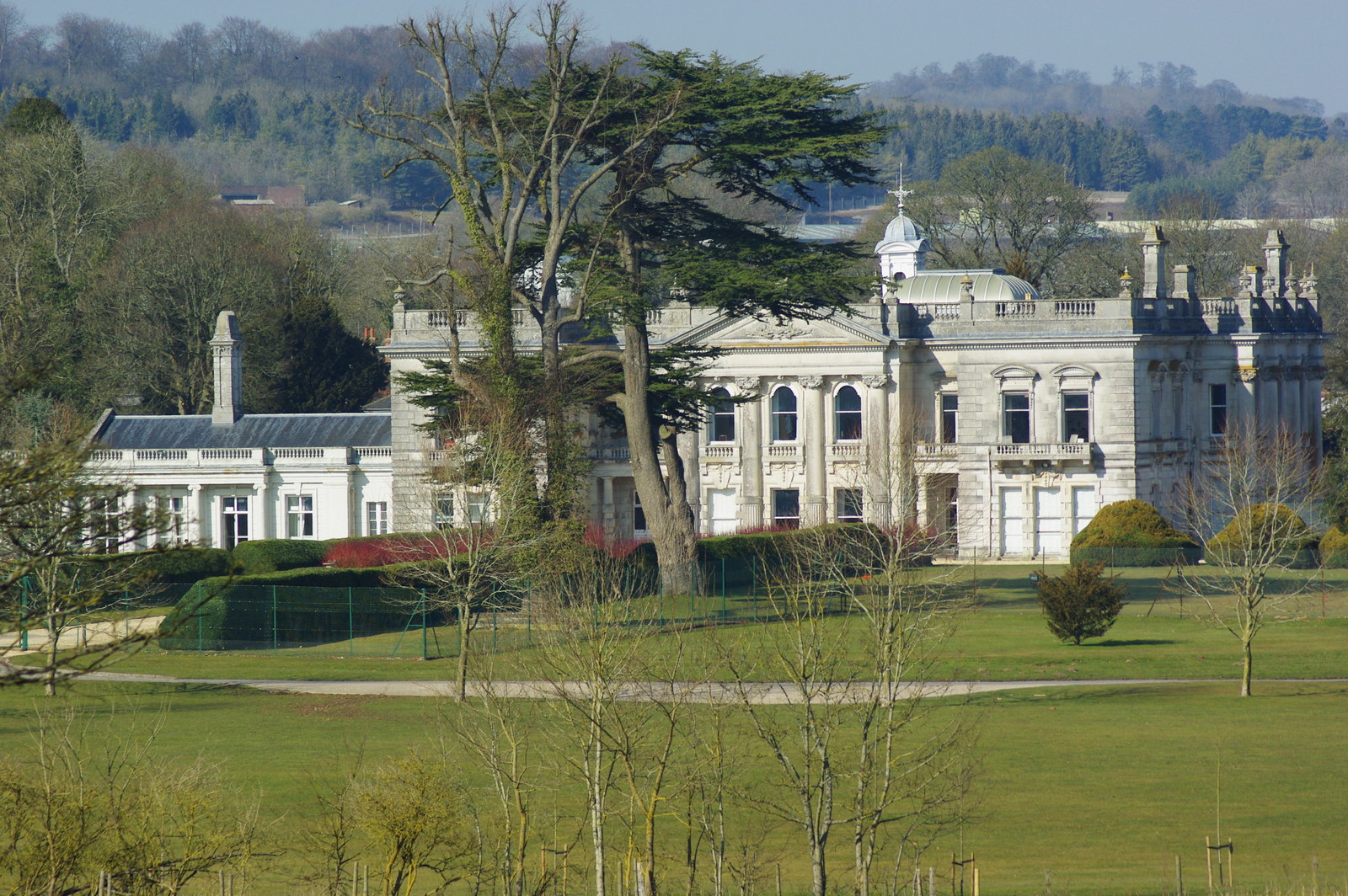

- Location within Wiltshire
- 51.2267°N 1.6681°W
- Location: Tidworth, Wiltshire, England

History
- Built: 1830

Listed Building – Grade II*
- Designated: 24 October 1984
- Reference no.: 1339397

Tedworth House, also known as South Tidworth House, is a 19th-century country house in Tidworth, Wiltshire, England. It is a Grade II* listed building.

The house and its grounds were in Hampshire until 1991, when the county boundary was redrawn.

== History ==
The first house on the site, on the southwest outskirts of South Tidworth, was well established when it was purchased by Thomas Smith in 1650. The estate passed to his grandson, John Smith (1656–1723), who became Chancellor of the Exchequer, and then to his son Thomas who died unmarried soon after in 1728. It was inherited (together with the Vaynol Park estate in Wales) by Thomas Assheton (d.1774) of Ashley Hall, Cheshire, nephew of Captain William Smith, another of John Smith's sons.

Assheton added Smith to his name, and his son Thomas Assheton Smith (1752–1828) was MP for Caernarvonshire and later for Andover. After his death his son, also Thomas (1776–1858), a keen foxhunter who at one time kept 200 hounds, moved here with his horses and hounds. He had the house rebuilt in ornate classical style in 1828–1830. (Note: Historic England give c.1860 for the rebuilding but this conflicts with other sources.) The new two-storey house, faced in ashlar, has an imposing south front where the three-bay centre has a pediment above four Ionic columns.

It passed to Francis Sloane Stanley, nephew of his widow, who leased it first to Lord Broughton, a cabinet minister, and then from 1871 to Edward Studd, a wealthy indigo planter and racehorse owner, who was the father of the notable cricketer brothers. Studd created a cricket ground and racecourse, then from 1874 until his death in 1876 made the house an evangelical centre.

The estate was acquired in 1877 by Sir John Kelk, 1st Baronet, a civil engineering contractor, who carried out extensive restructuring in 1878–80. It was inherited by Sir John William Kelk, 2nd Baronet in 1886.

=== 20th century ===
The War Office bought the estate in 1897, and in 1905 the house became the official residence of the General in Command of the Salisbury Plain Military District. In 1911 the house stood in 500 acres (200 ha) of grounds, described as a "well wooded park". In the First World War it became the Garrison Officers' Mess for Tidworth Camp, which had been built in the north of the estate, and then accommodation for nurses.

An annual Tidworth Tattoo was held on the polo ground in front of the house from the 1920s until 1972.

During the Second World War the house served as a club for American soldiers, before reverting to its role as nurses' accommodation, then from 1977 was again the Officers' Mess.

In 2011, the house become a recovery centre for service personnel operated by the Help for Heroes charity, which was officially opened in May 2013 by Prince Harry and Prince William. Alterations had included the building of a three-storey accommodation block. In 2021, the recovery centre was said to be run by the Ministry of Defence.

== Associated buildings ==
The two-storey stable block west of the house was built in the mid-19th century and forms three sides of a square, with an entrance archway in the east side. It is in red brick and has a 20th-century clock tower.

A single-storey lodge, plain in style but with verandahs, was built at the north entrance to the estate in the early 19th century.

== Sources ==
- Eardley-Wilmot, Sir John E (1893) [1859]. A Famous Fox Hunter. Reminiscences of the late Thomas Assheton Smith, Esq., or The Pursuits of an English Country Gentleman (5th and cheaper ed.). London: Sampson Low, Marston & Co – via Internet Archive.
