= Edward Studd (cricketer, born 1849) =

English cricketer

Edward John Charles Studd (13 February 1849 – 1 March 1909) was an English first-class cricketer active 1879–88 who played for Marylebone Cricket Club (MCC). He was born in Tirhoot, India and died in Folkestone. He played in 21 first-class matches as a right-handed batsman, scoring 621 runs with a highest score of 110.
