= Kynaston Studd =

British cricketer, businessman, and mayor

Sir Kynaston Studd Bt
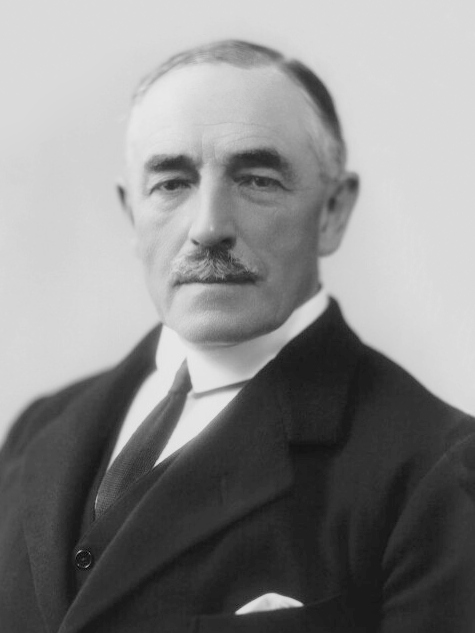
- Studd in 1923

Personal information
- Full name: John Edward Kynaston Studd
- Born: 26 July 1858; Tidworth, Wiltshire, England
- Died: 14 January 1944 (aged 85); Marylebone, London, England
- Batting: Right-handed
- Bowling: Right-arm fast

Domestic team information
- Years: Team
- 1878–1885: Cambridge University

Career statistics
Competition	First-class
Matches	54
Runs scored	1,681
Batting average	18.07
100s/50s	1/11
Top score	154
Balls bowled	500
Wickets	32
Bowling average	26.83
5 wickets in innings	0
10 wickets in match	0
Best bowling	3/32
Catches/stumpings	22/–
- Source: CricInfo, 17 November 2022

Sir John Edward Kynaston Studd, 1st Baronet (26 July 1858 – 14 January 1944), known as "JEK", was a British cricketer, businessman and Lord Mayor of London.

== Family ==
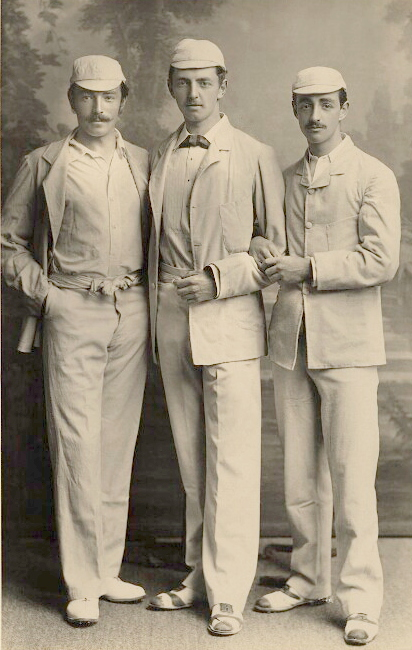
Left–right: Kynaston, Charles and George Studd

Studd was born at Tedworth House, Tidworth, Wiltshire. He married, firstly, Hilda Proctor-Beauchamp, daughter of Sir Thomas William Brograve Proctor-Beauchamp, 4th Bt. and Hon. Catherine Esther Waldegrave, on 10 December 1884. He married, secondly, Princess Alexandra Lieven, daughter of Prince Paul Lieven, on 18 June 1924. He died in Marylebone, London, on 14 January 1944, at age 85.

Children of Sir Kynaston Studd, 1st Bt., and Hilda Proctor-Beauchamp:

- Sir Eric Studd, 2nd Bt., b. 10 Jun 1887, d. 1975
- Ronald Granville Studd, b. 6 Sep 1889, d. 9 Jan 1956
- Reverend Lionel Fairfax Studd, b. 16 May 1891, d. 15 Feb 1915
- Bernard Cyril Studd, b. 24 Aug 1892, d. 30 Mar 1962
- Vera Constance Victoria Studd, b. 14 Jun 1897

There were no children of the second marriage.

== Sporting career ==
=== Cricketing Studds ===
Sir Kynaston was the eldest of the famous three Studd Brothers, and the last of them to captain Cambridge in consecutive seasons.

At Eton, Kynaston was never on the losing side in the needle matches against Harrow and Winchester. In 1879 he went up to Trinity College, Cambridge, and was four years in the XI without ever excelling in the annual University match; things moved on in 1882 when he and his brothers took an important role in defeating by six wickets the great Australian side (which later in the season beat England at Kennington Oval by seven runs). In the match, Kynaston scored 6 and 66, G B. 42 and 48, C. T. 118 and 17 not out; when Cambridge batted a second time requiring 165 runs for victory, the two elder brothers put up 106.

=== Olympics ===
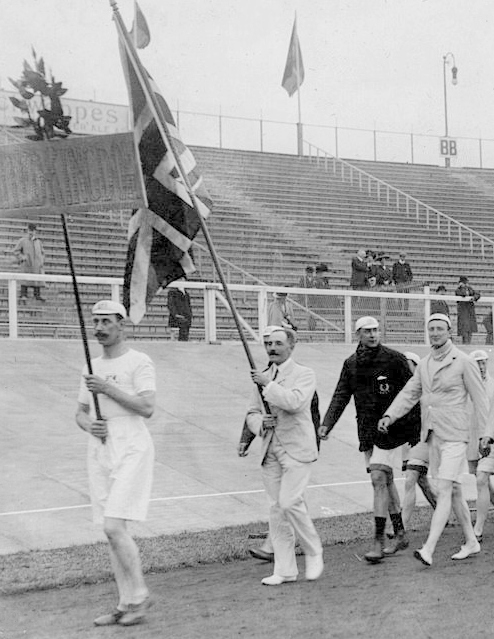
Studd carrying the flag at the 1908 Olympics in London

With the 1908 London Games being the first true Summer Olympics to feature a parade of nations, Studd can be said to be the first person to carry the flag for Great Britain at an Olympic event. However, cricket was only played at the 1900 Olympic Games and Studd was therefore not a competitor.

== University and beyond ==
While still at university, Kynaston was president of Cambridge Inter-Collegiate Christian Union and was involved in helping his brother Charles set up and become one of the famous Cambridge Seven missionaries to China.

After leaving Cambridge, where he was a member of the Pitt Club, Kynaston played occasionally for Middlesex, but spent most of his time on business and at the Royal Polytechnic Institute where he was president from 1903 until his death. He was awarded the OBE in the 1919 New Year Honours.

After serving as Sheriff of London for 1922–23, he was knighted in 1923 and became Lord Mayor of London for 1928–29. He was created Baronet at the end of his official year. While President of MCC in September 1930 he gave a banquet at Merchant Taylors' Hall to the Australian team captained by W. M. Woodfull.

His great-nephew Sir Peter Malden Studd was also Lord Mayor of London, from 1970 to 1972.

== Legacy ==
Canon F. H. Gillingham, the former Dulwich College and Essex batsman, in his address at the Studd's memorial service in St. Paul's Cathedral said that after coming down from Cambridge, Kynaston realised that games were only a preparation for sterner duties, and in his presence it was easier for men to be good and harder to be bad. "Everything he touched he lifted up."

The Studd Trophy for athletic achievement at the Royal Polytechnic Institution is named for him.

Baronetage of the United Kingdom
New creation	Baronet (of Netheravon); 1929–1944	Succeeded by Eric Studd
