= George Studd =

English cricketer and missionary

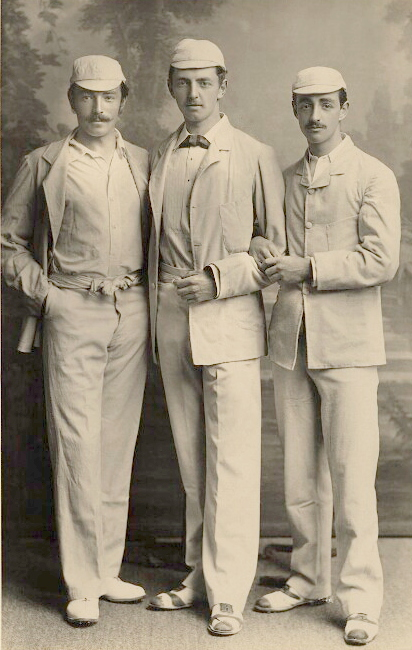
- George Studd (right) with his brothers Kynaston and Charles

Personal information
- Born: 20 October 1859; Netheravon, Wiltshire, England
- Died: 13 February 1945 (aged 85); Pasadena, California, U.S.
- Batting: Right-handed

International information
- National side: England
- Test debut (cap 41): 30 December 1882 v Australia
- Last Test: 21 February 1893 v Australia

Career statistics
Competition	Test	First-class
Matches	4	87
Runs scored	31	2,892
Batting average	4.42	21.90
100s/50s	0/0	3/15
Top score	9	120
Balls bowled	–	76
Wickets	–	2
Bowling average	–	14.50
5 wickets in innings	–	0
10 wickets in match	–	0
Best bowling	–	1/5
Catches/stumpings	8/–	74/–
- Source: CricInfo, 1 November 2022

George Brown Studd (20 October 1859 – 13 February 1945) was an English cricketer and missionary.

Studd was the second eldest of the famous Studd brothers, who dominated English cricket in the late 19th century. He played in four Tests with the English cricket team, and played first-class cricket for Cambridge University and Middlesex County Cricket Club.

Studd was born at Netheravon House, near Amesbury, Wiltshire, England. He won his cricket Colours for Eton in 1877 when he scored 32 and 23 against Harrow and 54 against Winchester. He went up to Trinity College, Cambridge in 1878, where he won his Blue as a freshman and played in the university match, against Oxford, four times. He made 38 and 40 against Oxford in 1880, and he and two of his brothers, Kynaston and Charles, were together in the Cambridge team in 1881 and 1882. George was captain of Cambridge in 1882, when he scored 120, which at the time was only the seventh three-figure score and the second highest in University matches. While primarily a cricketer, George also played against Oxford in singles and doubles tennis during his last two years as an undergraduate at Cambridge.

In 1882, he made 819 runs in first-class matches and then scored 289 while playing for the Cambridge Long Vacation Club. George and his brother Charles toured Australia in 1882/3 with the Marylebone Cricket Club (MCC) captained by the Honourable Ivo Bligh. The team won back the Ashes, but George disappointed in the four Tests in which he played, scoring only 31 runs in 7 innings.

George was called to the Bar, but never practised. Like his brother Charles, he became a missionary, initially with the Peniel Mission of Theodore and Manie Payne Ferguson, before joining the Apostolic Faith mission in September 1907. From 1891 until his death, he lived and worked in a notorious and squalid area of Southern Los Angeles in California.
