= John Thomas Smith =

John Thomas Smith is the name of:

- John Thomas Smith (engraver) (1766–1833), also known as Antiquity Smith, British painter, engraver and antiquarian
- John Thomas Smith (British Army officer) (1805–1882), British colonel
- John Smith (Victoria politician) (1816–1879), Australian politician and mayor of Melbourne
- J. T. Smith (American football) (born 1955), former professional American football player
