= Electoral district of Kilmore, Kyneton and Seymour =

Former electoral district of the Victorian Legislative Council

The Electoral district of Kilmore, Kyneton and Seymour was one of the original sixteen electoral districts of the old unicameral Victorian Legislative Council of 1851 to 1856. Victoria being a colony in Australia at the time.

The district's area was based on the towns of Kilmore, Kyneton and Seymour.

From 1856 onwards, the Victorian parliament consisted of two houses, the Victorian Legislative Council (upper house, consisting of Provinces) and the Victorian Legislative Assembly (lower house).

== Members ==
One member initially, two from the expansion of the Council in 1853.

Member 1	Term		
Peter Snodgrass	Nov. 1851 – Mar. 1856	Member 2	Term
Peter Snodgrass	Nov. 1851 – Mar. 1856	Patrick O'Brien	Aug. 1853 – Mar. 1856

Snodgrass went on to represent the Electoral district of Anglesey in the Victorian Legislative Assembly from November 1856.
O'Brien went on to represent the Electoral district of South Bourke in the Victorian Legislative Assembly from November 1856.

== See also ==
- Parliaments of the Australian states and territories
- List of members of the Victorian Legislative Council
