= Ellen Kent Hughes =

Australian medical practitioner and alderman

Ellen Kent Hughes MBE
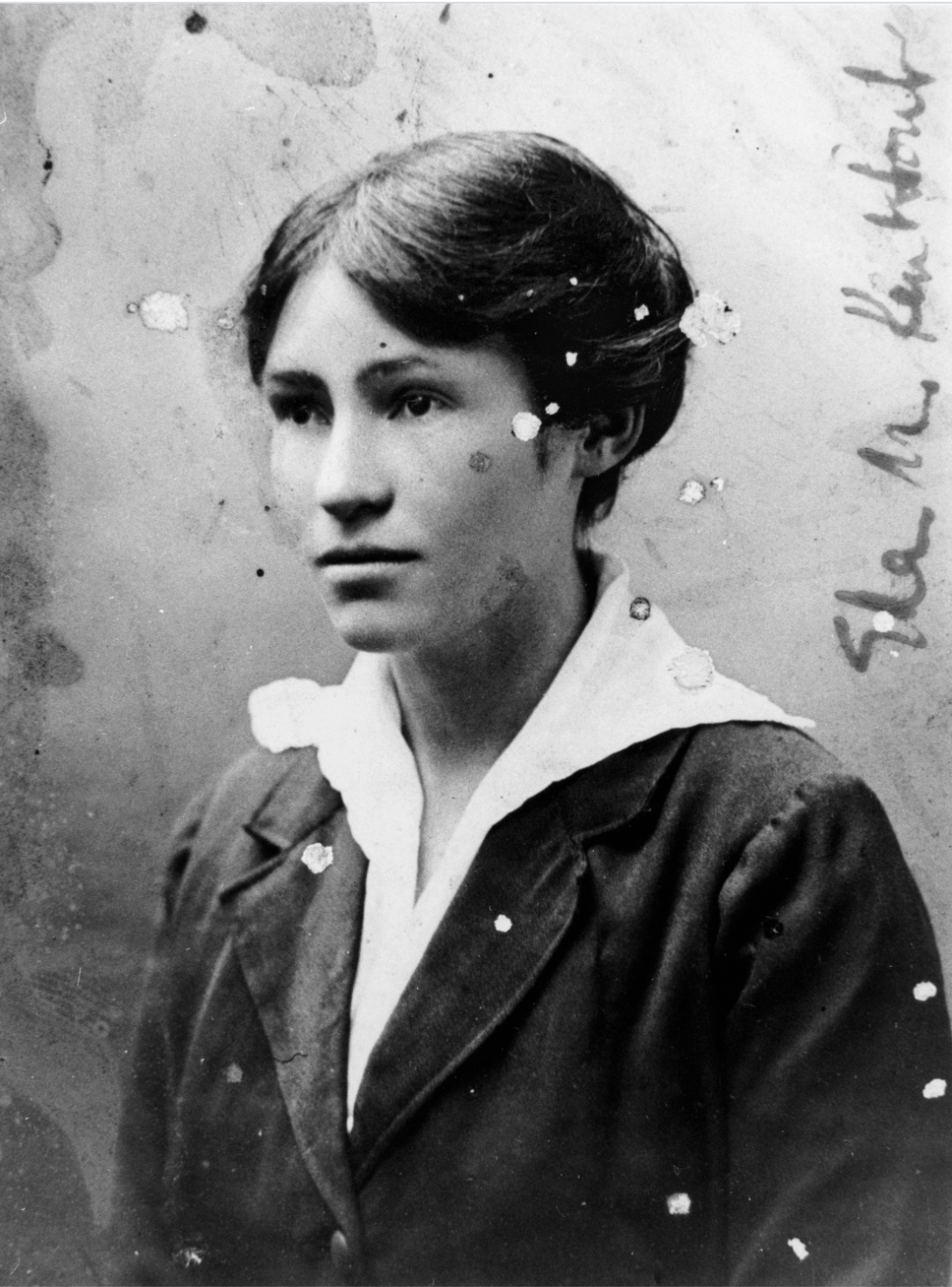
- Ellen Mary Kent Hughes, (State Library of Queensland photograph)

Councillor of the Shire of Kingaroy
- In office 7 July 1923 – 1924

Councillor of the City of Armidale
- In office 1937–1968

Deputy Mayor of Armidale
- In office 1963–1964

Personal details
- Born: Ellen Mary Kent Hughes; 29 August 1893 Fitzroy, Victoria, Australia
- Died: 16 May 1979 (aged 85) Armidale, New South Wales, Australia
- Occupation: Medical practitioner, councillor

Ellen Mary Kent Hughes, MBE (29 August 1893 – 16 May 1979) was an Australian medical doctor and council alderman. She was the first woman to serve on a local government council in Queensland, serving on the Kingaroy Shire Council from 1923 to 1924.

== Early life ==
Ellen Mary Kent Hughes was born on 29 August 1893 in Fitzroy, Melbourne. Hughes was the eldest of seven children of Wilfred Kent Hughes, a surgeon, and his wife Clementina Rankin, who had been a nurse in England. Hughes was the niece of Rev. Ernest Selwyn Hughes, Frederic Hughes and Eva Hughes and through her mother, first cousin of Philip Seaforth James. Two of her siblings, Wilfrid Kent Hughes and Gwendolen Kent Lloyd, would also achieve significance in the community. Hughes attended Ruyton Girls' School, Kew. She left school in 1912 while her mother was in a hospital for tuberculosis. Hughes enrolled at the University of Melbourne in 1913 residing at Trinity College Hostel. She would complete her M.B.B.S. degree in 1917. Hughes married Paul René Loubet of France and a medical-assistant at the Children's Hospital, Melbourne in July 1917. Loubet died three months after they married. Hughes was pregnant with their child.

== Medical career ==
Hughes' colleagues assisted her in finding work after her husband's death, at Queen Victoria Memorial Hospital for Women and Children. In 1918, working under the professional name of Dr Kent Hughes, Ellen worked as resident medical officer at the Hospital for Sick Children in Brisbane. She was a resident at the Hospital during the influenza and diphtheria epidemics of 1919 where she took the responsibility almost single-handedly for 200 desperately ill children. Her son was cared for by his nanny, Alice Pickup, who would reside with Hughes for 54 years. A locum job became available in Mitchell, a town west of Brisbane. Hughes took the job. She met Francis Garde Wesley Wilson and in August 1920, Hughes married Garde Wilson. They had four children together. The family moved to Kingaroy.

Kent Hughes was elected to the Kingaroy Shire Council in an extraordinary election on 7 July 1923, becoming the first woman to serve on a Queensland local government council. She had been nominated by the Queensland Country Women's Association and the Queensland Women's Electoral League.

The family moved to Armidale in 1928, where Kent Hughes opened a medical practice with Roger Mallam, and continued her active community work. She worked as an Honorary paediatrician at the Armidale and New England Hospital, government medical officer and a justice of the peace. Kent Hughes was particularly interested in indigenous women's health, which remained one of her interests throughout her life. She was known to visit Aboriginal nurse and midwife Emma Callaghan's home based hospital to treat patients.

Kent Hughes served as an alderman from 1937 to 1968 in the Armidale City Council. She was Deputy Mayor from 1963 to 1964. She was appointed a Member of the Order of the British Empire in 1968. She became a Fellow of the Royal College of General Practitioners in 1971, and was awarded the freedom of the city of Armidale in 1975.

Kent Hughes retired from work in 1977. She died on 16 May 1979 in Armidale and was survived by her five children.

== Legacy ==
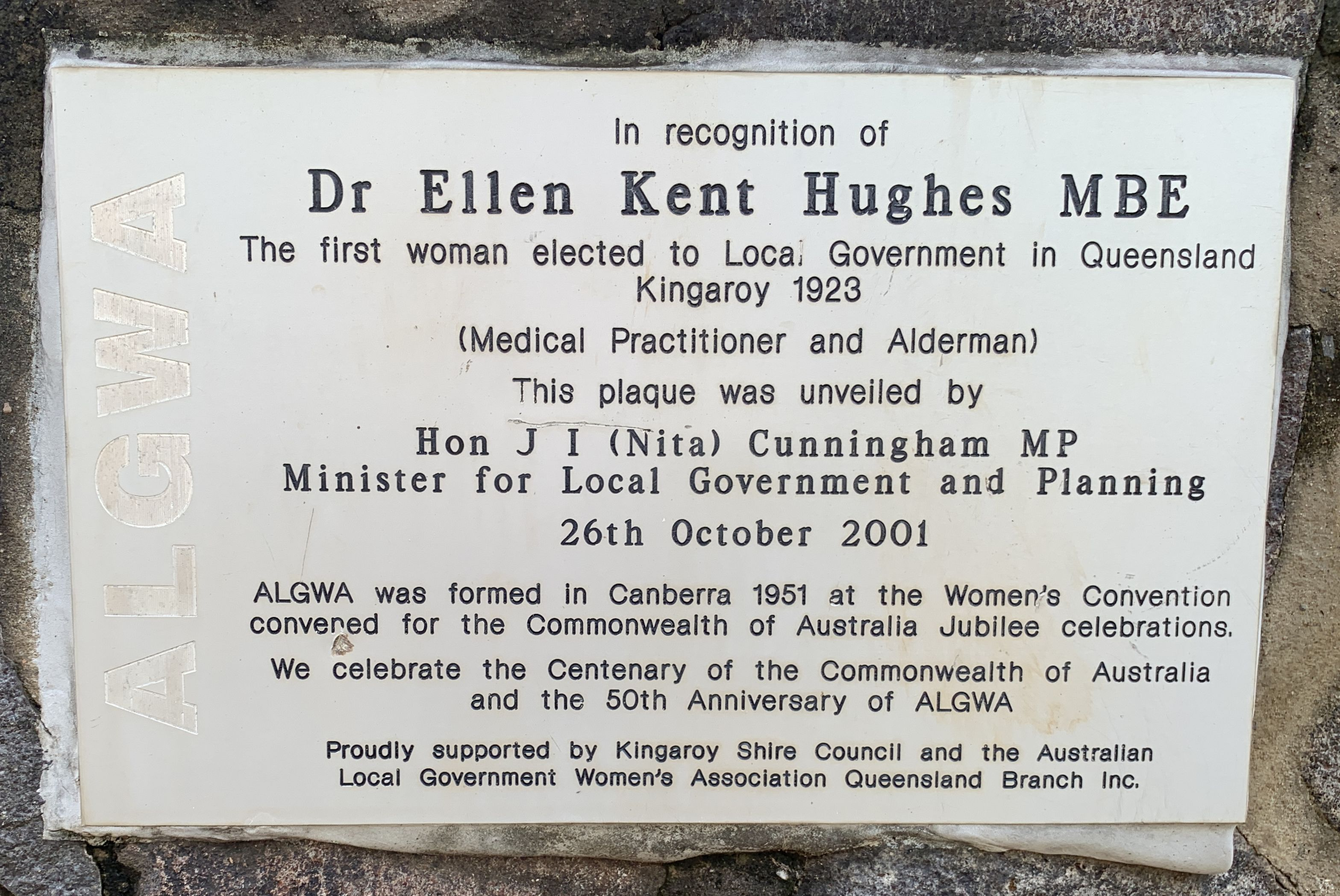
Plaque commemorating Dr Ellen Kent Hughes's election to the Kingaroy Shire Council, placed 2001 in O'Neill Square, 2023

Her home, Kent House, was given over to a community centre in 1990.

On 26 October 2001, a memorial to Kent Huges was officially unveiled by Nita Cunningham in King Street, Kingaroy (26.5390°S 151.8398°E) in O'Neill Square, outside the former Kingaroy railway station.

In 2011, the forecourt in front of the South Burnett Regional Council Chambers in Glendon Street, Kingaroy, was named in her honour (the South Burnett Regional Council being the successor of the Kingaroy Shire Council). However, there was a Facebook campaign to name it after cricketer Matthew Hayden, describing Kent Hughes as "an obscure politician". There was no change to the name of the forecourt, but it was proposed to name another venue after Hayden.

A scholarship was established in her name in 2016, to encourage young women of the South Burnett Region, where Hughes had been a young doctor, to pursue a tertiary education.
