= Percy Guillemard Llewellin Smith =

British officer in the Royal Engineers

- Born: 15 June 1838; Madras, India
- Died: 25 April 1893 (aged 54); Bournemouth, England
- Occupation: Officer in the Royal Engineers

Percy Guillemard Llewellin Smith (15 June 1838 – 25 April 1893) was a British officer in the Royal Engineers.

== Biography ==
Smith was born in Madras, India, on 15 June 1838. He became a lieutenant in the royal engineers on 28 February 1855, served in South Africa from August 1857 to January 1862, was promoted captain on 31 December 1861, and was employed on the defences of Portland and Weymouth until 1869, and on the construction of Maryhill Barracks, Glasgow, until 1874. On 5 July 1872 he was promoted to be major, and in 1874 was appointed instructor in construction at the School of Military Engineering at Chatham. He was promoted to be lieutenant-colonel on 20 December 1879, in which year he became an assistant director of works under the admiralty at Portsmouth. In October 1882 he succeeded Major-general Charles Pasley as director of works at the admiralty, and during ten years of office carried out many important works, both at home and at Malta, Gibraltar, Bermuda, Halifax, and Newfoundland. He was promoted to be brevet colonel on 20 December 1883. He retired from the military service on 31 December 1887 with the honorary rank of major-general, but retained his admiralty appointment. He died at Bournemouth on 25 April 1893. He was twice married: first to a daughter of Captain Bailey, R.N.; and, secondly, in 1886, to Miss Ethel Parkyns.

He was the author of Notes on Building Construction, published anonymously, 1875–1879, in 3 vols. 8vo. A fourth volume, on the Theory of Construction, was published in 1891. He contributed to vols. xvi. and xviii. new ser. of the ‘Professional Papers of the Corps of Royal Engineers.

His father John Thomas Smith was also in the Royal Engineers
