= Patrick O'Brien (Australian politician) =

Australian politician (1817–1887)

Patrick O'Brien (1817 – 12 April 1887) was a British wine and spirit merchant and politician in colonial Victoria, a member of the Victorian Legislative Council and later, the inaugural Victorian Legislative Assembly.

== Early life ==
O'Brien was born in Shanna-golden, Limerick, Ireland.

== Colonial Australia ==
O'Brien arrived in New South Wales in 1838 and Port Phillip District in 1840. In August 1853, he was elected to the unicameral Victorian Legislative Council for Kilmore, Kyneton and Seymour, a seat he held until the original Council was abolished in March 1856. O'Brien was elected to the seat of South Bourke in the first Victorian Legislative Assembly in November 1856, a seat he held until August 1859 when he lost his bid to be re-elected.

O'Brien died in London, England, on 12 April 1887, aged 69 or 70. He married twice.

Victorian Legislative Council
New seat	Member for Kilmore, Kyneton and Seymour; August 1853 – March 1856; With: Peter Snodgrass	original Council abolished
Victorian Legislative Assembly
New district	Member for South Bourke; November 1856 – August 1859; With: Charles Pasley 1856–1857; Sidney Ricardo 1857–1859	Succeeded by Louis Smith; Hibbert Newton
