= Cliveden, East Melbourne =

Demolished mansion in East Melbourne, Victoria, Australia

Coordinates: 37.8157°S 144.9832°E

Cliveden
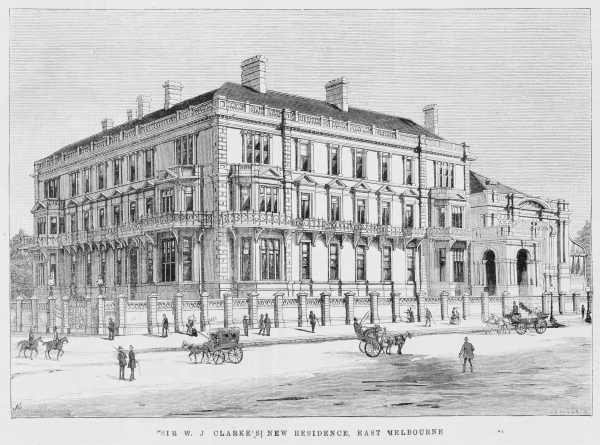
- Cliveden, East Melbourne

General information
- Architectural style: Renaissance Revival
- Location: East Melbourne, Victoria, Australia, 192–198 Wellington Parade
- Completed: 1888
- Owner: Sir William Clarke

Design and construction
- Architect: William Wardell
- Architecture firm: Wardell & Vernon
- Main contractor: Stephen Armstrong
- Known for: Town residence of Sir William and Lady Clarke

Cliveden was a large Italian Renaissance style mansion in Melbourne, the capital city of the-then Colony of Victoria which stood on the corner of Clarendon Street and Wellington Parade. Completed in 1888, the house was the town residence of pastoralist millionaire Sir William Clarke. The House was converted into an apartment building in the 1910s, and later demolished in 1968. The Pullman Hotel currently stands on the former site of the mansion.

== History ==
Various sources have quoted the cost of the construction as ranging from £20,000, to £91,000, including fit-out costs.

During its first decade of occupation the Clarke family reportedly kept a household of twenty-one servants at Cliveden, and the house quickly became the social centre of Melbourne society. After the Governor of Victoria, Sir William and his second wife Lady Clarke were said to stand "at the top" of Melbourne high society; during the 1890s. Sir William's position as leader of the Turf Club and Melbourne Freemasons, and Lady Clarke's involvement in the leadership of a wide range of charities allowed them to command an unparalleled degree of social influence in the City, with balls at Cliveden said to eclipse those held at Government House in their magnificence. Following Sir William's death in 1897, his widow inherited Cliveden.

Janet, Lady Clarke continued to live at Cliveden until her death in 1909; her executors proceeded to sell Cliveden for £22,000 to the Australian Baillieu family, who converted the building into a fashionable apartment complex, Cliveden Mansions.

In 1968 the building was sold to the Hilton Hotel Group, who oversaw the demolition of the building later that year, and a large contemporary building was constructed in its place which became the Hilton Melbourne.

== Architecture ==
The building was designed by William Wardell. Following its completion in 1888, the three-story house was said to contain twenty-eight bedrooms, five bathrooms, seventeen servants' bedrooms, and a ballroom measuring 100 feet by 50 feet.

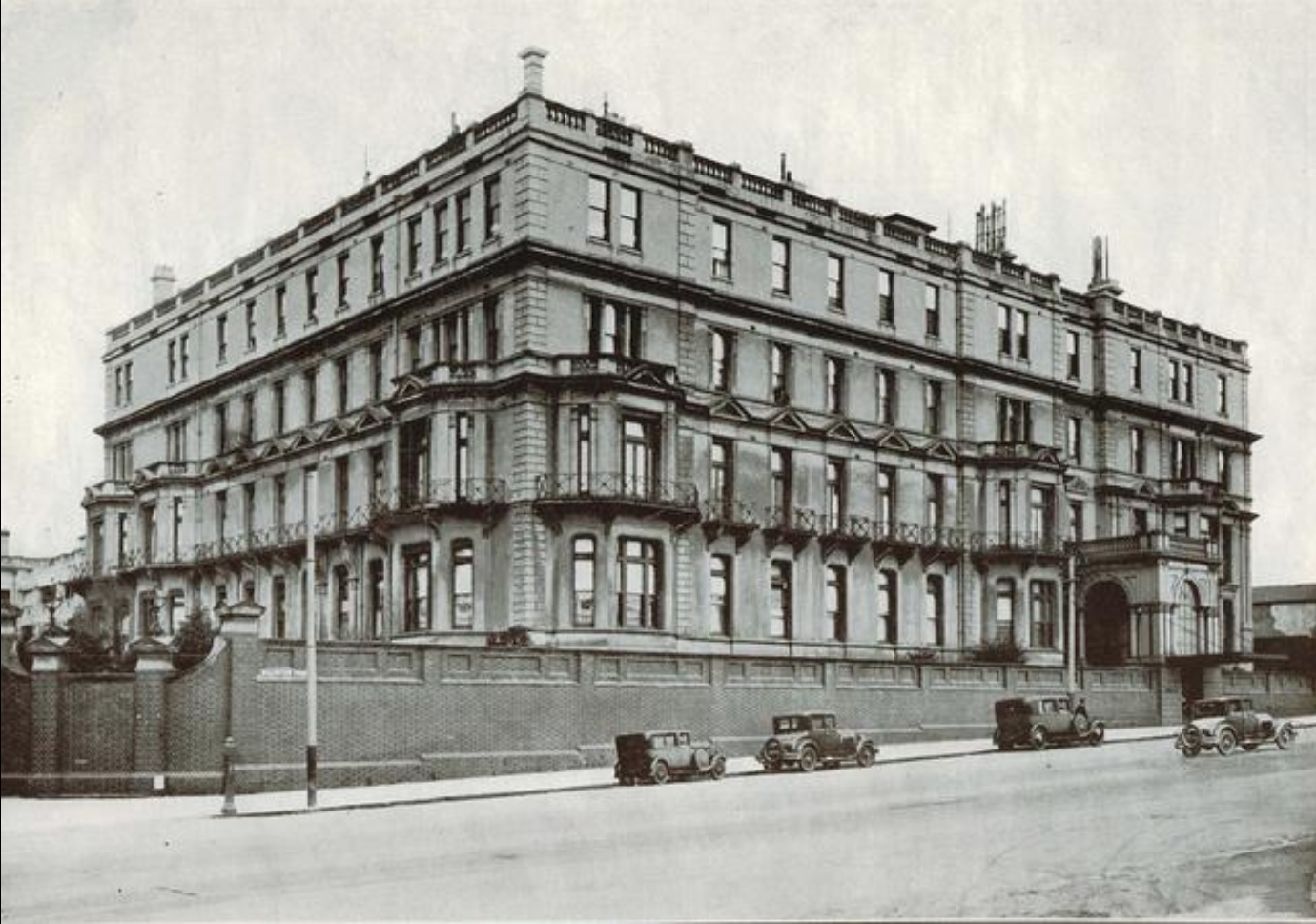
Cliveden Mansions, c. 1930, after the building's conversion into apartments

After the sale of Cliveden by Lady Clarke's executors in 1909, an additional story was added as part of the conversion of the building into apartments.

== See also ==
- List of demolished buildings and structures in Melbourne
