= Eva Hughes =

Australian political activist

Agnes Eva Hughes OBE
- Born: Agnes Eva Snodgrass; 1856
- Died: 10 June 1940 (aged 83–84); St Kilda, Victoria, Australia
- Known for: Co-founder and president of the Australian Women's National League
- Spouse: Frederic Hughes
- Father: Peter Snodgrass
- Relatives: Janet Clarke (sister); John Cotton (maternal grandfather); Kenneth Snodgrass (paternal grandfather

Agnes Eva Hughes, OBE (née Snodgrass; c. 1856 – 10 June 1940) was a political activist in Victoria, Australia. She was one of the founders and presidents of the Australian Women's National League, and she campaigned for conscription in the First World War.

== Early life ==
Hughes was born Agnes Eva Snodgrass to Charlotte Agnes Snodgrass née Cotton, and Peter Snodgrass. She had an older sister Janet Clarke, a philanthropist who also created The Ashes urn. She also has a brother Evelyn who was canonised in the Church of England. On 1 October 1885, Hughes married to the businessman and army officer Frederic Hughes in St Kilda. They had four children between 1886 and 1891.

== Career ==
In 1904, Hughes and five other women founded the Australian Women's National League (AWNL), a conservative group. At their first meeting which Hughes chaired, her sister, Janet was elected president. In September 1909, Hughes was elected state president, a role she maintained for 13 years. Under her leadership, the AWNL grew to 420 branches and 50,000 members.

During World War I, Hughes encouraged conscription and war work and used her role as president of the AWNL to promote the cause.

In October 1918, it Hughes appointment as an Officer of the Order of the British Empire was announced.

== Death ==
Hughes died on 10 June 1940 in St Kilda at her residence Kantaka. She was survived by both her husband and their four children.

== In popular culture ==
Eva Hughes is one of the six Australians whose war experiences are presented in The War That Changed Us, a four-part television documentary series about Australia's involvement in the First World War.
