= Frederic Hughes =

Australian World War I general

Frederic Godfrey Hughes
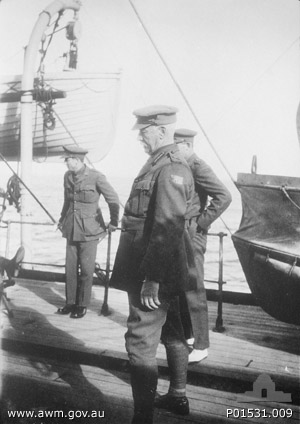
- Brigadier General Frederic Hughes on board a transport ship in 1915
- Born: 26 January 1858; Windsor, Victoria
- Died: 23 August 1944 (aged 86); St Kilda, Victoria
- Spouse: Eva Hughes (m. 1885; died 1940)
- Relatives: Ellen Kent Hughes (niece); Sir Wilfrid Kent Hughes (nephew)
- Military career
- Allegiance: Colony of Victoria; Australia
- Branch: Victorian Military Forces; Citizens Military Force
- Service years: 1875–1920
- Rank: Major General
- Commands: 3rd Light Horse Brigade (1914–15); 7th Light Horse Brigade (1912–14); 4th Light Horse Brigade (1907–12); 11th Australian Light Horse Regiment (1903–07); Rupertswood Battery (1889–97); Victorian Nordenfeldt Battery (1888–89)
- Conflicts: First World War; Gallipoli Campaign; Battle of the Nek
- Awards: Companion of the Order of the Bath; Colonial Auxiliary Forces Officers' Decoration; Mentioned in Despatches (2)

Major General Frederic Godfrey Hughes, CB, VD (26 January 1858 – 23 August 1944) was an Australian Army general in the First World War. A prominent businessman, and two-time mayor of St Kilda, Hughes was also part-time Militia officer, and had served in the artillery forces of the Victorian colonial forces prior to federation. Post federation, Hughes had risen to command several light horse brigades before volunteering for service with the Australian Imperial Force in October 1914. Appointed to command the 3rd Light Horse Brigade, he subsequently led the formation to Egypt and then Gallipoli. During the Battle of the Nek his brigade suffered heavy casualties and he was later evacuated from the peninsula in September 1915, suffering with typhoid. He continued to suffer ill health, but returned to active service mid-1918, undertaking a staff role until 1920 when he retired as a major general. Post war, he returned to civilian business and died in St Kilda at the age of 86.

== Early life and career ==
Frederic Godfrey Hughes was born on 26 January 1858 in the Melbourne suburb of Windsor, the son of a grazier, Charles Hughes and his wife Ellen. He was educated at Melbourne Grammar School. As a youth, Hughes was a talented player of Australian rules football; he was also an accomplished athlete and rower, according to biographer Judy Smart. He played for St Kilda for three seasons beginning in 1876, and then transferred to Essendon in 1879. The Footballer magazine described him as "a most useful man, plays very hard and with remarkable judgment, follows splendidly, a fine kick, and unerring mark".

After leaving school, Hughes undertook clerical work, and was employed by a land valuer until he started his own business in this field in 1884. In 1898, he became a St Kilda City Councillor, serving for years including two periods as mayor (1901 to 1902 and 1911 to 1912). During this time, he held directorships with several companies, including Dunlop Rubber and South Broken Hill.

== Military career ==
In 1875, Hughes joined the part-time military forces – the Militia – being assigned as a gunner to the St Kilda Artillery Battery. After eight years, he had reached the rank of sergeant, before being commissioned as an officer in 1885. He assumed command of the Victorian Nordenfeldt Battery in mid-1888 with the rank of captain, and continued in the role after it became part of the Victorian Horse Artillery the following year, commanding the Rupertswood Battery. He received his majority in 1891 and, on the disbandment of his battery, he transferred to the field artillery in 1897 and was posted to a staff role in Melbourne. In 1901, he achieved the rank of lieutenant colonel, and assumed command of the 11th Light Horse Regiment in 1903. He was promoted to colonel in 1906, and placed in command of the 4th Light Horse Brigade. In 1909, Hughes took up an appointment as the Governor-General's aide de camp. In 1912, the 4th Light Horse Brigade was re-designated as the 7th Light Horse Brigade.

=== First World War ===
Following the outbreak of the First World War, Hughes volunteered for overseas service and was appointed Australian Imperial Force (AIF) as a colonel on 17 October 1914. At this time, he assumed command of the 3rd Light Horse Brigade; he was assigned Lieutenant Colonel John Antill, a regular officer, as his brigade major. Hughes came to depend heavily upon Antill, although the latter was described as "well respected, if prickly".

Hughes' brigade departed for Egypt in February and March 1915 where it continued training. In May, the light horse formations were dispatched to Gallipoli as reinforcements, serving in a dismounted role. The brigade arrived at Anzac Cove on 20 May 1915, and was assigned as corps troops to the Australian and New Zealand Army Corps. There were concerns about Hughes' age, and the corps commander, Lieutenant General William Birdwood, had "grave doubts about Hughes' capacity". Initially, Hughes held the rank of full colonel, but in July was promoted to brigadier general as all Australian brigade commanders were regraded to achieve parity with the British Army.

Hughes' brigade undertook defensive duties initially, holding an area around Walker's Ridge and Russell's Top. In an effort to break the deadlock they were committed to the August Offensive. Major General Alexander Godley, in command of the offensive, ordered Hughes to launch a dawn attack the Turkish positions at the Nek on 7 August 1915 with a bayonet charge as a diversion to support the attack on Chunuk Bair. From the outset the effort went awry. Efforts to destroy machine guns enfilading the attack failed, and the supporting artillery barrage stopped seven minutes early due to a failure to synchronise watches, which allowed the defenders were able to reoccupy their firing positions before the attack. In the desperate battle that followed, four waves of light horsemen charged the Turkish trenches, only to be cut down by unsuppressed fire from at least 30 machine guns.

According to military historian Ross Mallett, "Hughes mismanaged the battle" and while the wider issues that led to its failure were not of his making, his decisions ultimately exacerbated the heavy casualties his brigade suffered. During the battle, Hughes "left his headquarters around the time the second wave of 150 had attacked in order to try to observe the attack, thereby isolating himself from Antill and the rest of his headquarters". Antill subsequently refused a request from the commander of the 10th Light Horse Regiment, Lieutenant Colonel Noel Brazier, to cancel the third wave, which was also slaughtered. Part of the fourth wave also went over the top, before Brazier and some officers from the 8th Light Horse Regiment reached Hughes in time to call off any further waves. Out of around 500 men committed to the attack, more than half became casualties, with 234 being killed and 138 wounded. Most of those that were killed, died within only a few metres of the Australian trench line.

In the aftermath of the attack, Hughes' brigade took part in another attack, this time around Hill 60 in late August. After this, the brigade's regiments returned to defensive duties. Hughes' health subsequently deteriorated and on 20 September he was evacuated, suffering from typhoid. Command of the brigade then passed to Antill. In March 1916, Hughes embarked for Australia, due to ongoing health issues. Nevertheless, he was able to rejoin the AIF with the rank of brigadier general in July 1918, taking up an appointment with the Sea Transport Service. He retired in March 1920 with the rank of major general.

== Post-war ==
Hughes returned to civilian business in his later years. In retirement he focused on gardening. He died in St Kilda on 23 August 1944 at age 86. His wife, Eva, predeceased him; having married in 1885, the couple had four children. A funeral service was held at All Saints Church, St Kilda, and he was buried with military honours. His decorations included a Companion of the Order of the Bath and the Colonial Auxiliary Forces Officers' Decoration. He was also mentioned in despatches.

== See also ==
- List of Australian generals
