= Janet Clarke =

Australian charity administrator (1851–1909)

Janet, Lady Clarke
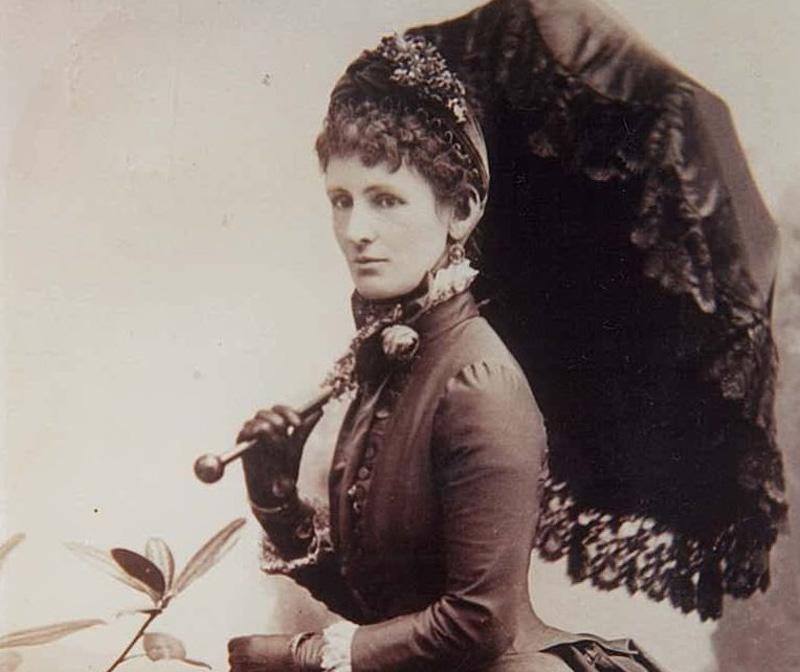
- Lady Clarke, c. 1880
- Born: Janet Marion Snodgrass; 4 June 1851; Yea, Victoria, Australia
- Died: 28 April 1909 (aged 57); East Melbourne, Victoria, Australia
- Burial place: Melbourne General Cemetery
- Monuments: Janet Lady Clarke Memorial
- Occupations: Socialite, philanthropist
- Spouse: William Clarke
- Children: 8 Children & 4 Step-Children, including: William Lionel Clarke; Francis Grenville Clarke; Rupert Turner Clarke
- Parents: Peter Snodgrass (father); Charlotte Agnes Cotton (mother)
- Relatives: Eva Hughes (sister)

Janet Marion Clarke (née Snodgrass; 4 June 1851 – 28 April 1909) was an Australian socialite and philanthropist. She was known to the general public as Lady Clarke, a title which she assumed after her husband's elevation to the baronetage in 1882.

== Early life and marriage ==
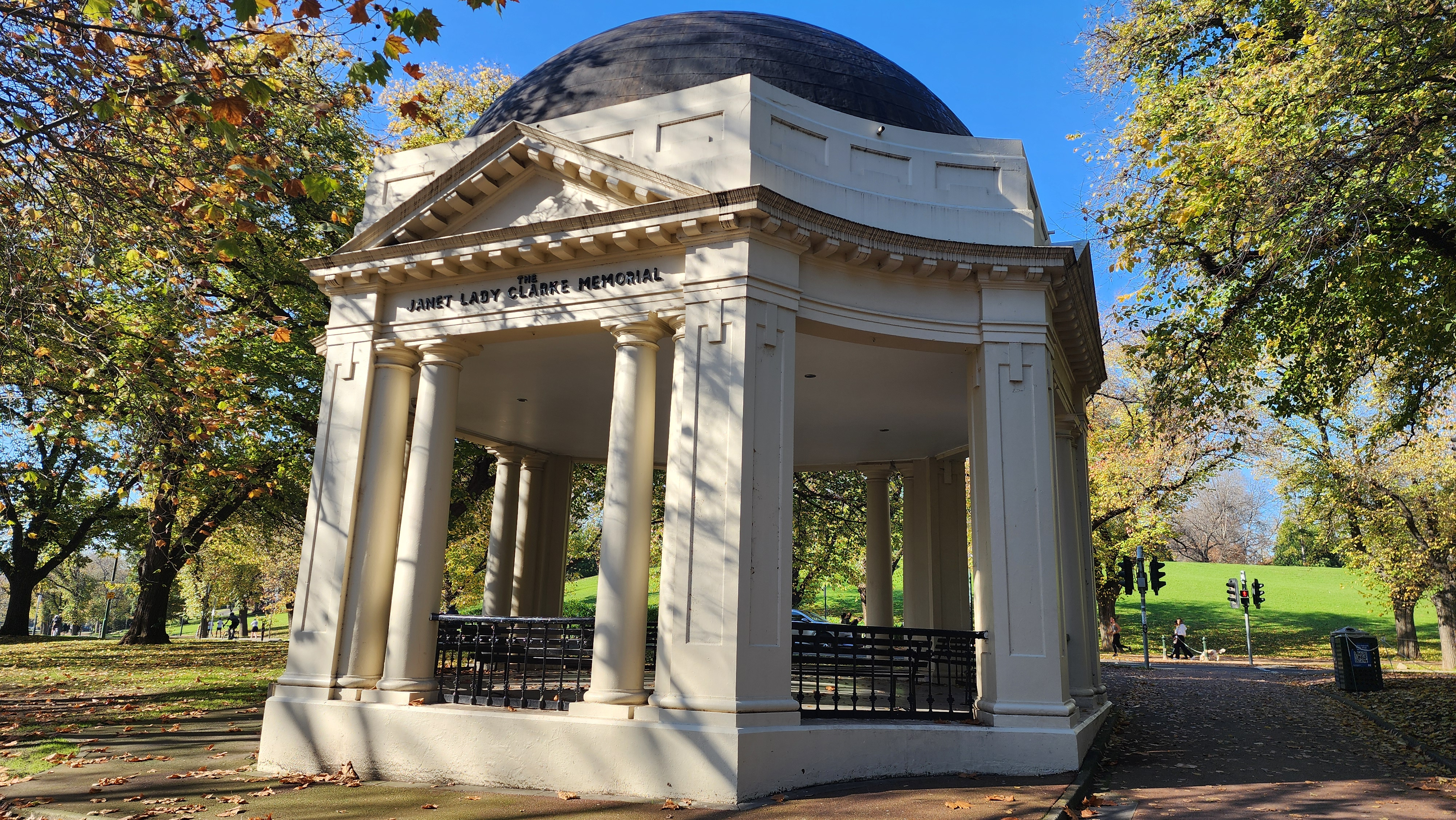
The Janet Lady Clarke Memorial in Queen Victoria Gardens

Janet Marion Snodgrass was born at Doogalloook, a station on the Goulburn River near Yea, Victoria. She was the daughter of Charlotte Agnes (née Cotton) and Peter Snodgrass. Her father, who died when she was 16, was an affluent landowner and a member of parliament. Her paternal grandfather was Colonel Kenneth Snodgrass, a Scottish-born British Army officer who became a colonial administrator in New South Wales, while her maternal grandfather – the owner of Doogallook – was the naturalist John Cotton. Her sister was Eva Hughes, one of the five women with whom Clarke co-founded the Australian Women's National League. She also had a brother Evelyn who became a canon in the Church of England.

In 1873, aged 21, Janet married William Clarke, 41-year-old widower for whom she had previously worked as a governess. She was stepmother to the four children from his first marriage, and bore an additional eight children herself (two of whom died young).

In 1874, her husband inherited a substantial fortune from his father, W. J. T. Clarke. He became the largest landowner in the country, and an exceedingly generous philanthropist, for which in 1882 he was raised to the baronetage (the first Australian to be so honoured).

== Socialite ==
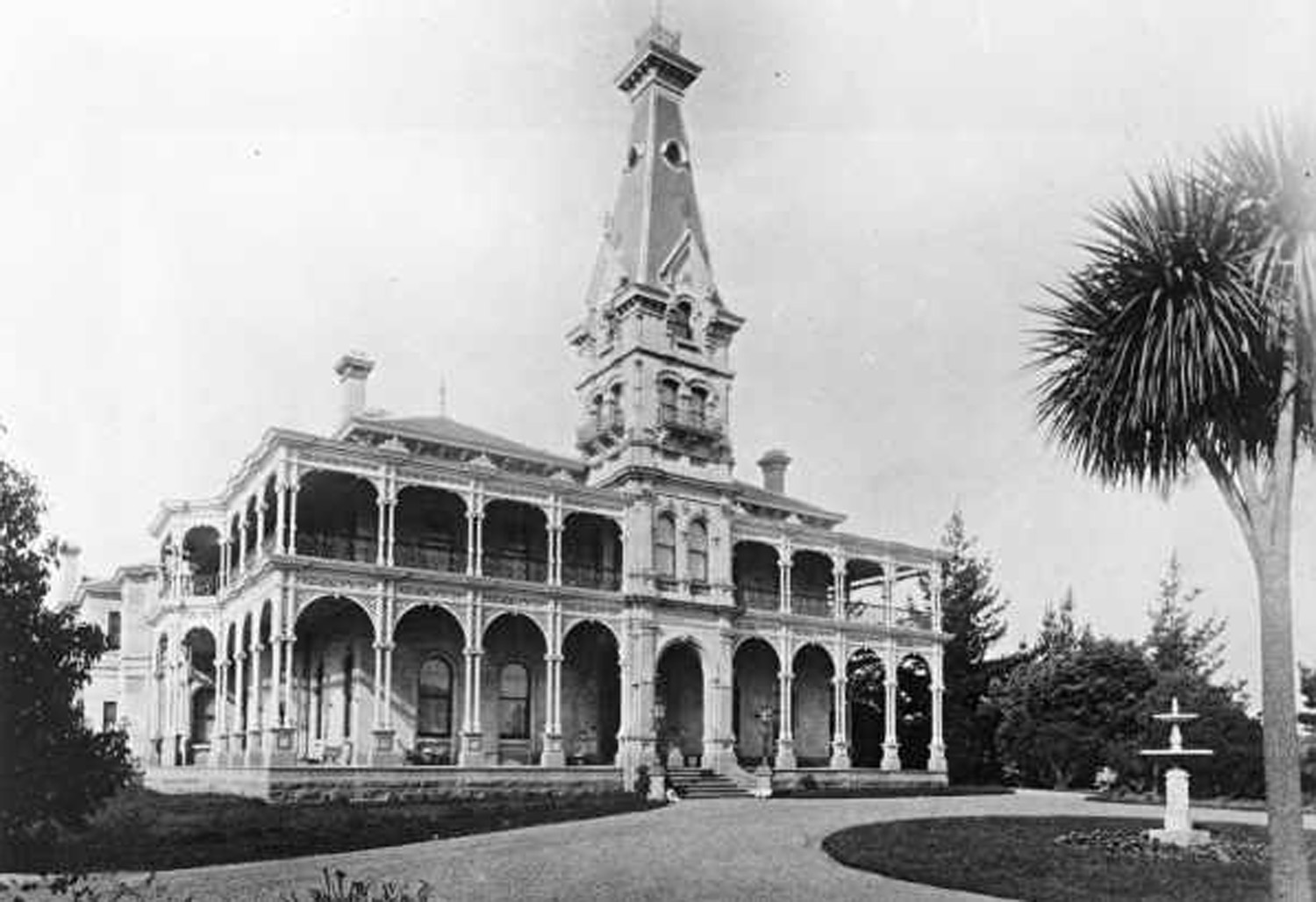
Rupertswood, c. 1890

In 1876, the Clarkes moved into Rupertswood, a large country mansion they had built near Sunbury. Their city residence was Cliveden, an equally massive mansion in East Melbourne that was completed in 1888. The couple were known for their lavish hospitality, hosting frequent balls, luncheons, dinners, and garden parties. Many singers and musicians got their starts by being asked to perform at these events. During the depression of the early 1890s, Clarke also ran a soup kitchen out of Cliveden.

In 1882, Clarke was involved in the creation of the Ashes urn, the trophy awarded to the winner of the Test cricket series between Australia and England. During their 1882–83 tour of Australia, Ivo Bligh were invited to spend Christmas at Rupertswood – Sir William being the president of the Melbourne Cricket Club. As a joke, Clarke presented Bligh with a small urn, in which the ashes of a burnt bail had been placed. This was a reference to Australia's defeat of England earlier in the year, after which a mock obituary had appeared in The Sporting Times proclaiming that English cricket had died and "the body will be cremated and the ashes taken to Australia".

== Community work and philanthropy ==
Clarke was the president of the Melbourne District Nursing Society (later renamed the Royal District Nursing Service) for all but one year between 1889 and 1909. In 2017, the organisation renamed itself Bolton Clarke, in honour of her and William Kinsey Bolton. Clarke also served on the boards of the Women's Hospital, the Hospital for Sick Children, and Melbourne Girls' Grammar School. In 1889, she donated £6,000 towards the establishment of the Hostel for Women University Students at Trinity College, Melbourne.

This provided the first separate residential accommodation for women students, and was later renamed Janet Clarke Hall in her honour and constituted as a separate college. In 1902, Clarke was elected as the inaugural president of the Victorian branch of the National Council of Women. In 1904 she also became the inaugural president of the Australian Women's National League, a political lobby group for women's interests.

== Death and legacy ==
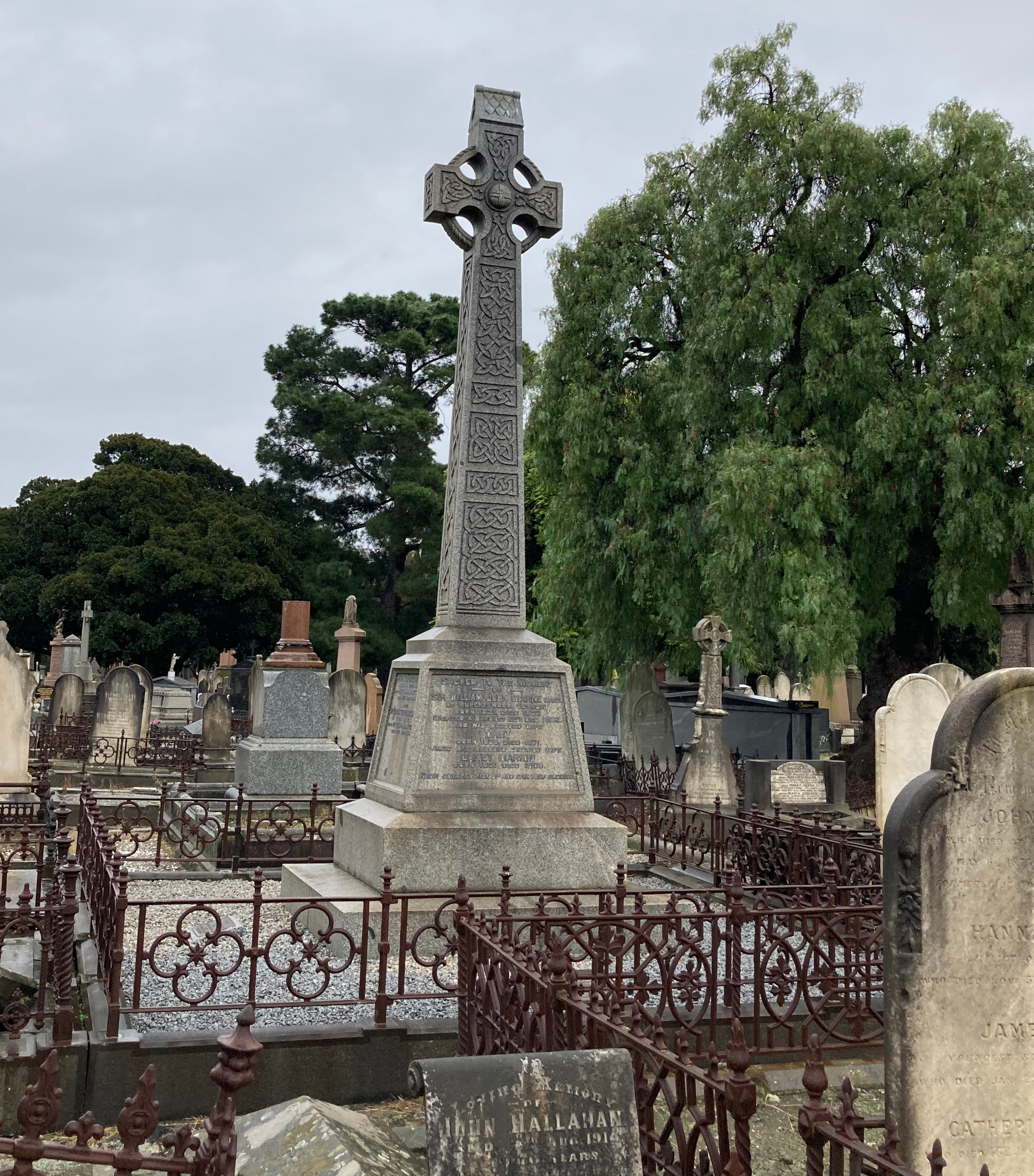
Graves of Janet and William Clarke at Melbourne General Cemetery

Clarke died at her East Melbourne home Cliveden on 28 April 1909, aged 57. She had been ill for about a year, suffering from pleurisy, pneumonia, and peritonitis at various times. Clarke's funeral was held at St Paul's Cathedral and officiated by Lowther Clarke, the Archbishop of Melbourne. Throngs of wellwishers lined the streets during the funeral procession. She was buried at the Melbourne General Cemetery next to her husband, who had predeceased in 1897. He was succeeded in the baronetage by Rupert Clarke, the oldest son from his first marriage. Two of Janet's sons, Russell and Sir Francis, became members of parliament.

Following her death, Cliveden was sold by her executors for £22,000.

A memorial fund was established after Clarke's death, the proceeds of which were used to build a memorial rotunda in Melbourne's Queen Victoria Gardens (opened in 1913).
