= Queen Victoria Gardens =

Urban park in Melbourne, Victoria, Australia

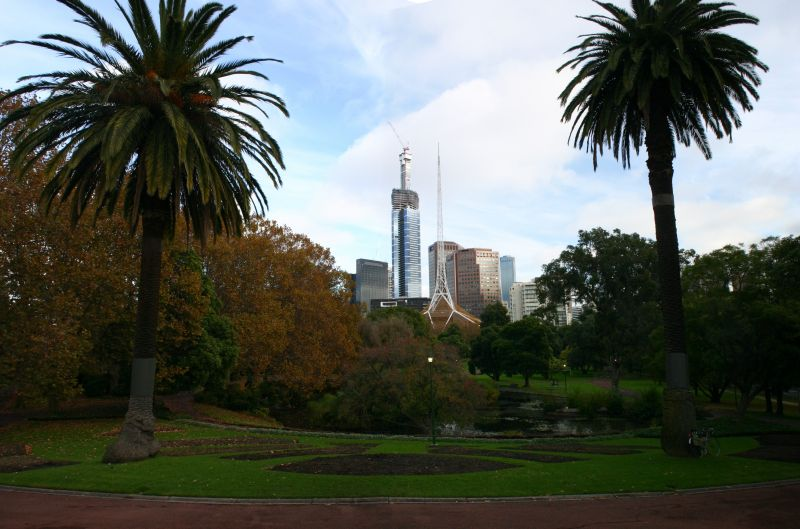
- The view from the Queen Victoria statue towards the Victorian Arts Centre

- Location within Melbourne
- Interactive map of Queen Victoria Gardens
- Type: Urban park
- Location: Melbourne, Victoria, Australia
- Coordinates: 37°49′18″S 144°58′18″E
- Area: 4.8 ha (12 acres)
- Opened: 1905; 121 years ago
- Operator: City of Melbourne
- Status: Open
- Paths: Sealed
- Terrain: Flat; riverbank
- Water: Ponds
- Vegetation: Australian natives; lawns; European gardens
- Public transit: – Flinders Street, Anzac; – St Kilda Road trams; – bus routes; – from Federation Square
- Landmarks: Floral clock; statues and memorials; waterfall
- Facilities: Toilets; seating
- Website: melbourne.vic.gov.au

Victorian Heritage Register
- Official name: Queen Victoria Memorial
- Type: Registered place
- Designated: 10 May 2007
- Reference no.: H0369
- Categories: Public art; Monuments and Memorials
- Heritage overlay no.: HO947

The Queen Victoria Gardens is a 4.8-hectare (12-acre) urban park located in the Melbourne city centre, in Victoria, Australia. Completed in honour of Queen Victoria, the gardens contain the Queen Victoria Memorial, a statue that was added to the Victorian Heritage Register on 10 May 2007 due to its historic and aesthetic significance.

The Queen Victoria Gardens are situated opposite the Arts Centre Melbourne and National Gallery of Victoria, bounded by St Kilda Road, Alexandra Avenue and Linlithgow Avenue. The gardens are part of a larger group of parklands directly south-east of the city, between St Kilda Road and the Yarra River known as the Domain Parklands that also include the Royal Botanic Gardens, Kings Domain, and Alexandra Gardens. The gardens are administered by City of Melbourne.

== Features ==
Originally home to native grasses, she-oaks, wattles, paperbarks, and river red gums, the area now consists of ornamental lakes, sweeping lawns, flowerbeds of annuals, and mature European and Australian trees and shrubs in a landscaped garden.

=== Queen Victoria Memorial ===
Queen Victoria's reign started in 1837, two years after the initial European settlement of Melbourne, and ended upon her death in 1901. At the time, it was thought appropriate to declare an enduring monument to her reign. A memorial statue was commissioned from sculptor James White showing the Queen in ceremonial gowns casting her regal gaze across ornamental lakes, sweeping lawns and rose gardens to the spire of the Arts Centre Melbourne and the city skyscrapers.

The memorial, made of Harcourt granite and white Carrara and Caloola marble from New South Wales, is positioned at the highest point of the gardens and commemorated five aspects of Queen Victoria. The memorial was unveiled by Sir John Madden on Empire Day, 24 May 1907.

In 2023, following the Coronation of King Charles III, the statue was doused with red paint.

=== Other features ===
A huge floral clock is positioned opposite the National Gallery of Victoria, containing over 7,000 flowering plants which are changed twice yearly. The clock was donated in 1966 to the City of Melbourne by a group of Swiss watchmakers.

Behind the clock stands a bronze equestrian statue, a memorial to Queen Victoria's successor, King Edward VII. The statue, by Melbourne born sculptor Bertram Mackennal, was unveiled on 21 July 1920.

A classic rotunda was built in 1913 and named after Janet, Lady Clarke, a philanthropist who worked for the welfare of women in Melbourne.

The gardens are also notable for their array of sculptures, including:

- The Genie – an exploratory play sculpture for children, designed by Tom Bass in 1973
- The Pathfinder – manufactured in 1974 by John Robinson and details a bronze Olympic Hammer thrower in action
- The Phoenix – sculptured from cast bronze and welded copper sheet by Baroness Yrsa Von Heistner in 1973 to commemorate the 40th International Eucharistic Congress
- The Bronze Water Children – an installation by John Robinson, made in 1973, which shows playing children at the top of a stream
- The Water Nymph – a kneeling bronze figure sculptured in 1925 by Paul Montford, modelled on Eileen Lillian Prescott

The MPavilion, a temporary 350-square-metre (3,800 sq ft) pavilion, was erected in the gardens on an annual basis between 2014 and 2023, typically removed after five months.

== Gallery ==
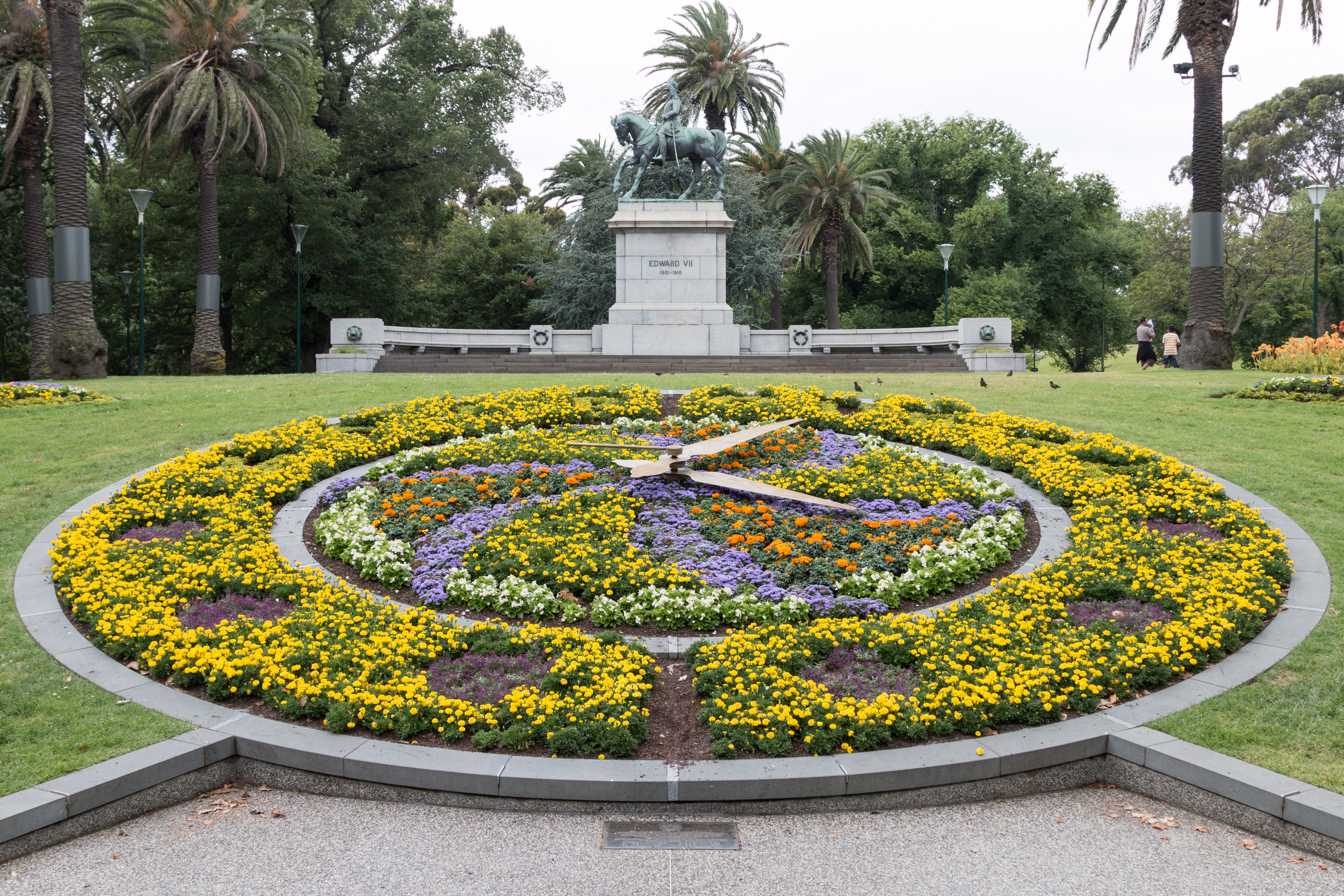
The Queen Victoria Gardens' Floral Clock

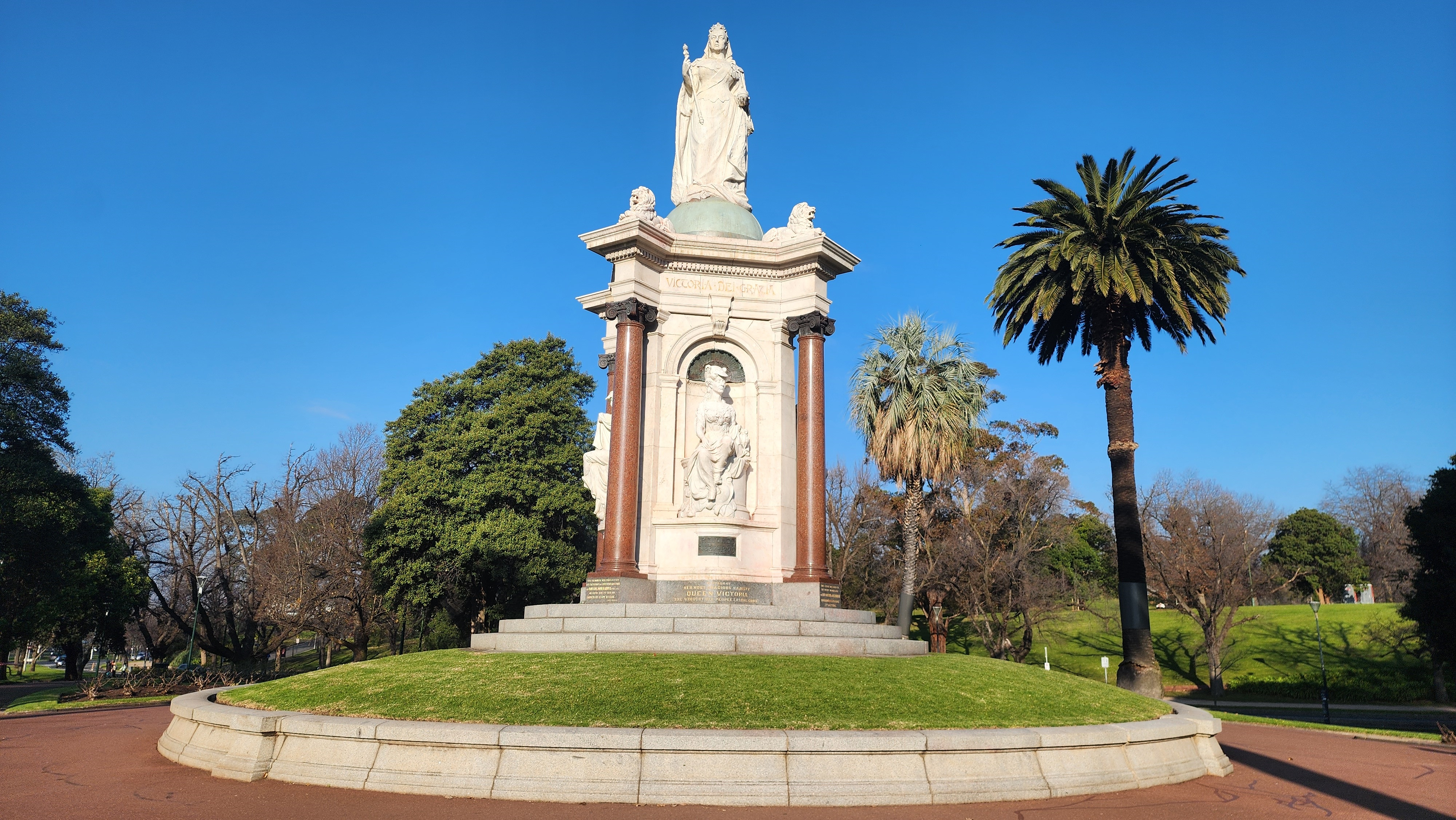
Heritage-listed Queen Victoria Memorial

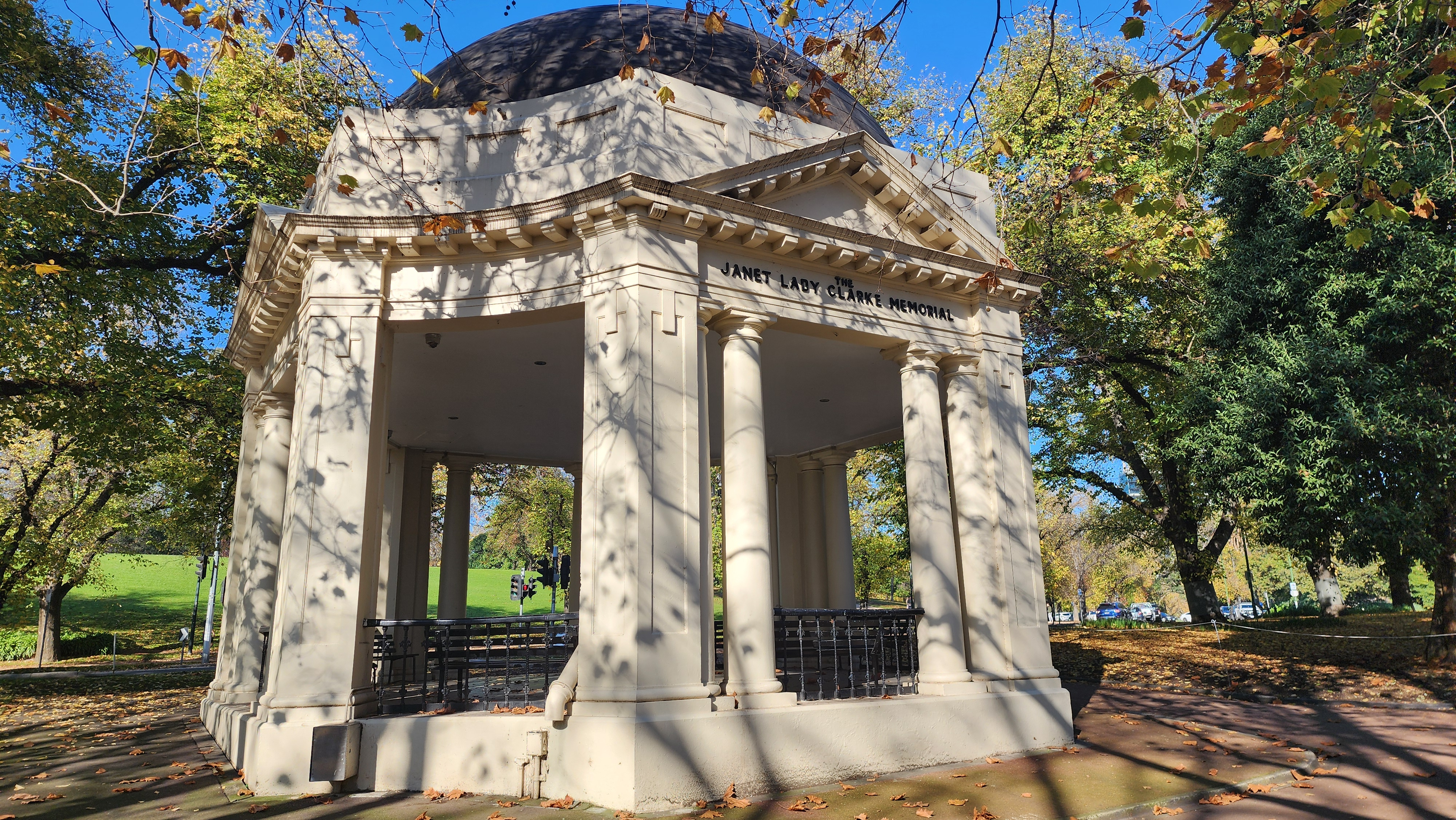
The Janet Lady Clarke Memorial

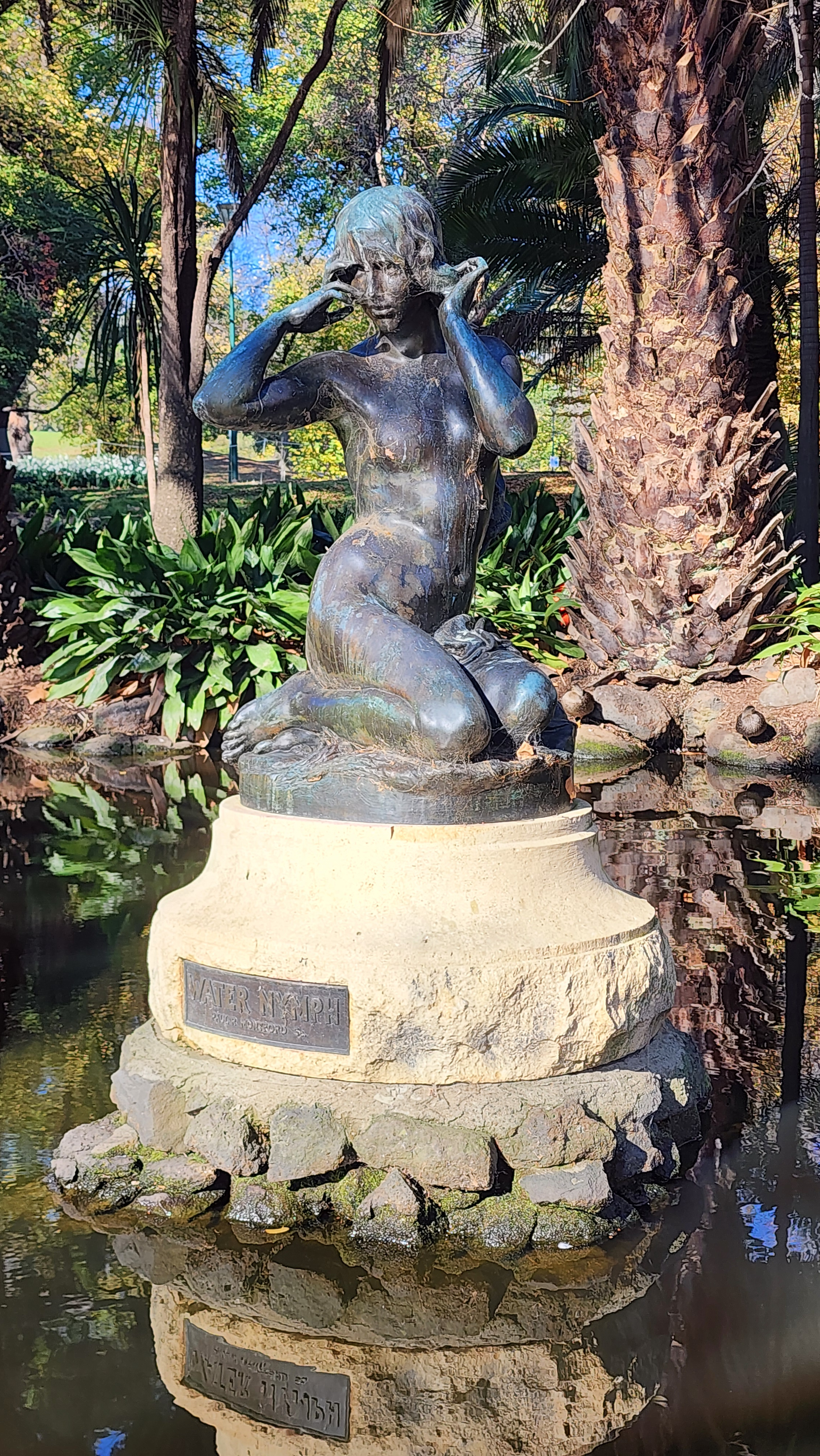
Water Nymph

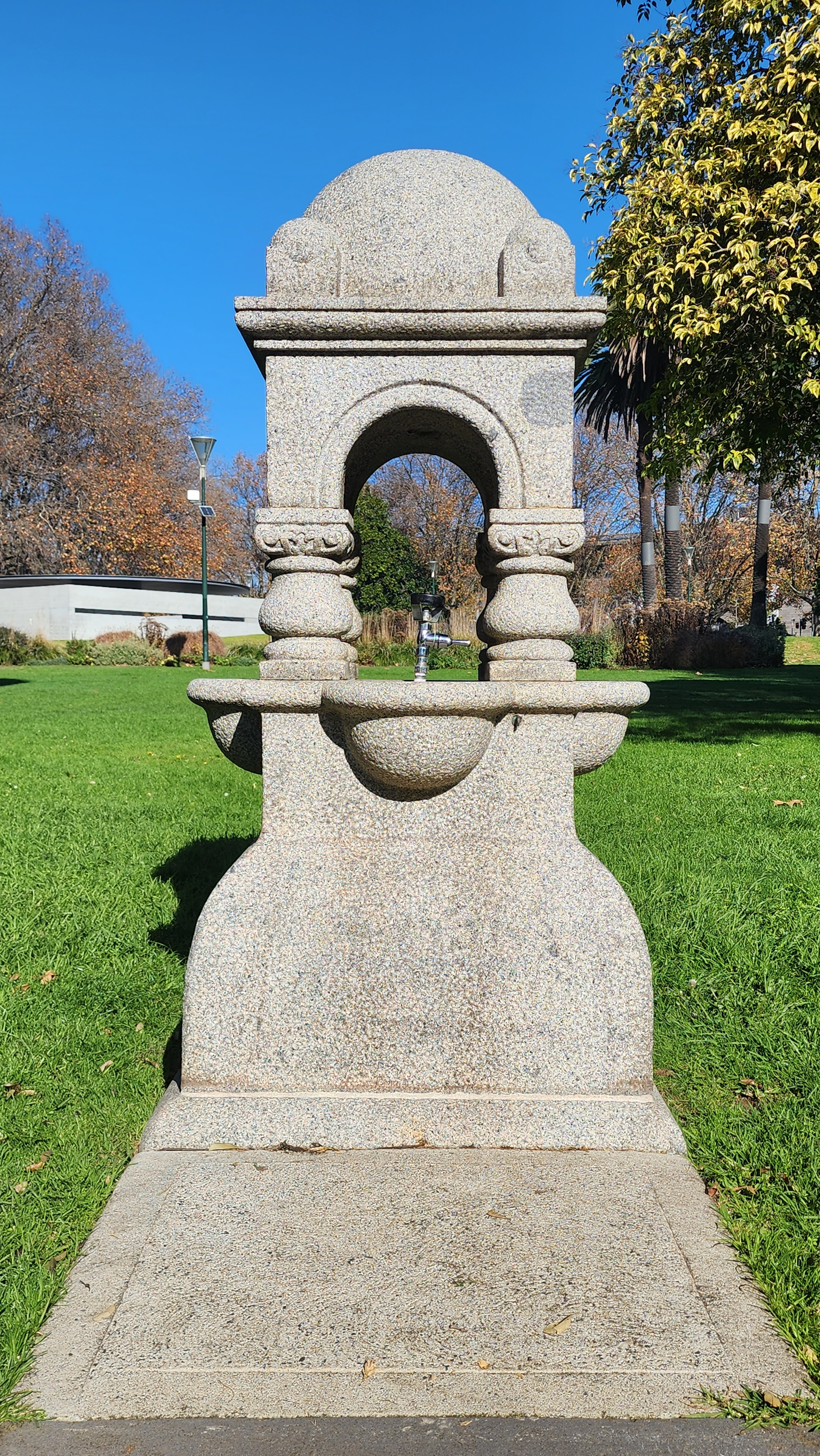
Domed Drinking Fountain

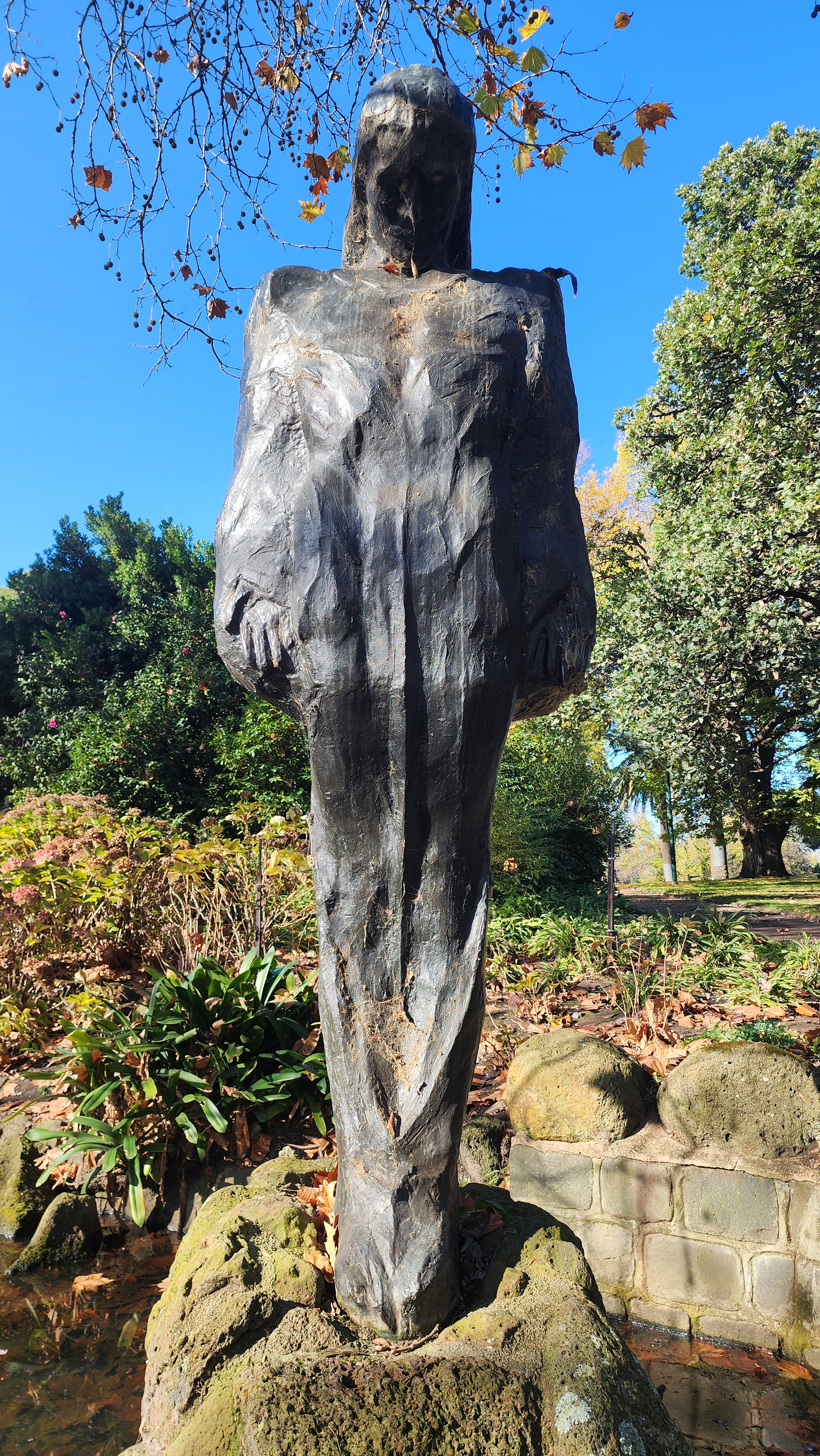
Phoenix

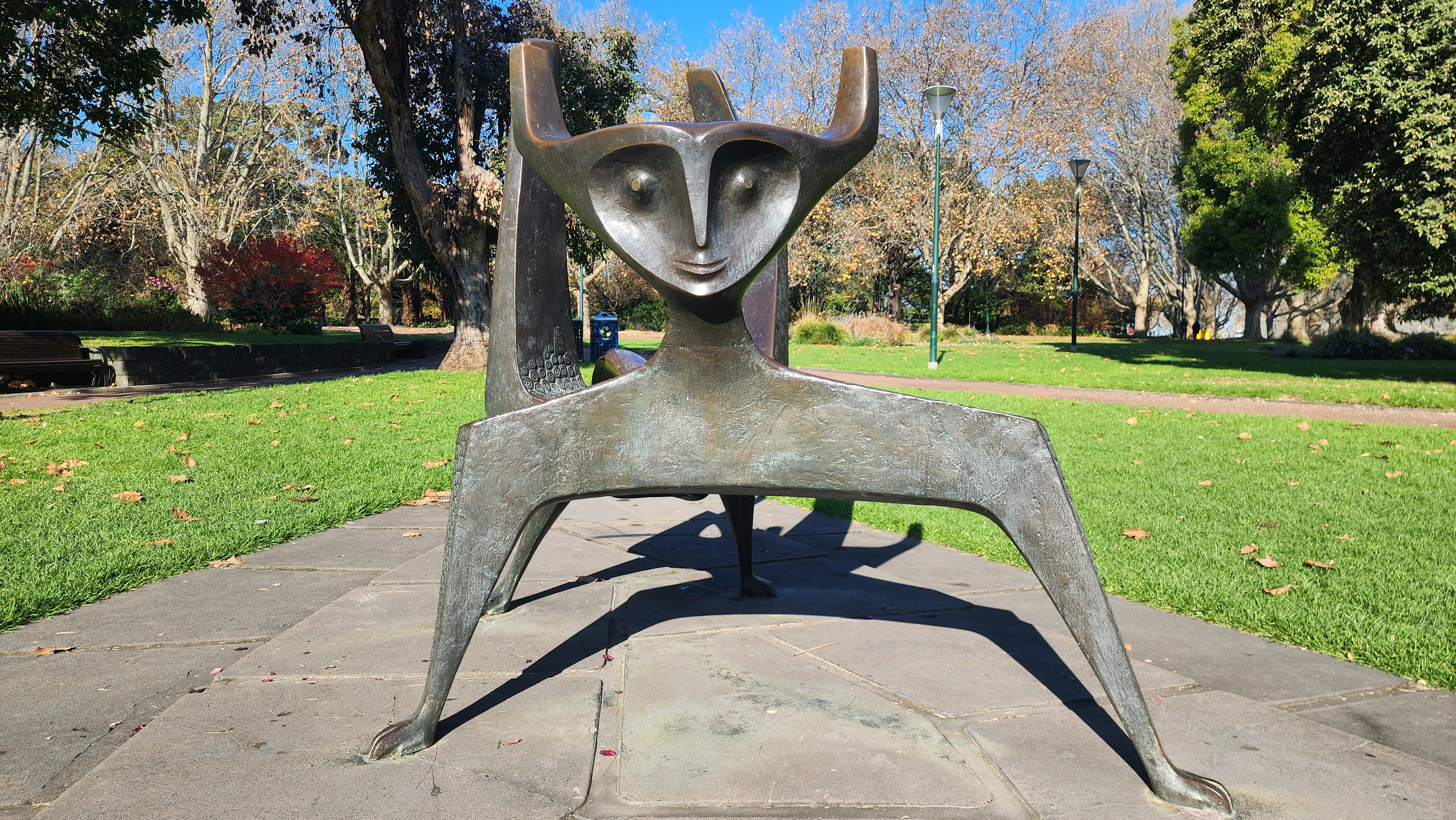
The Genie

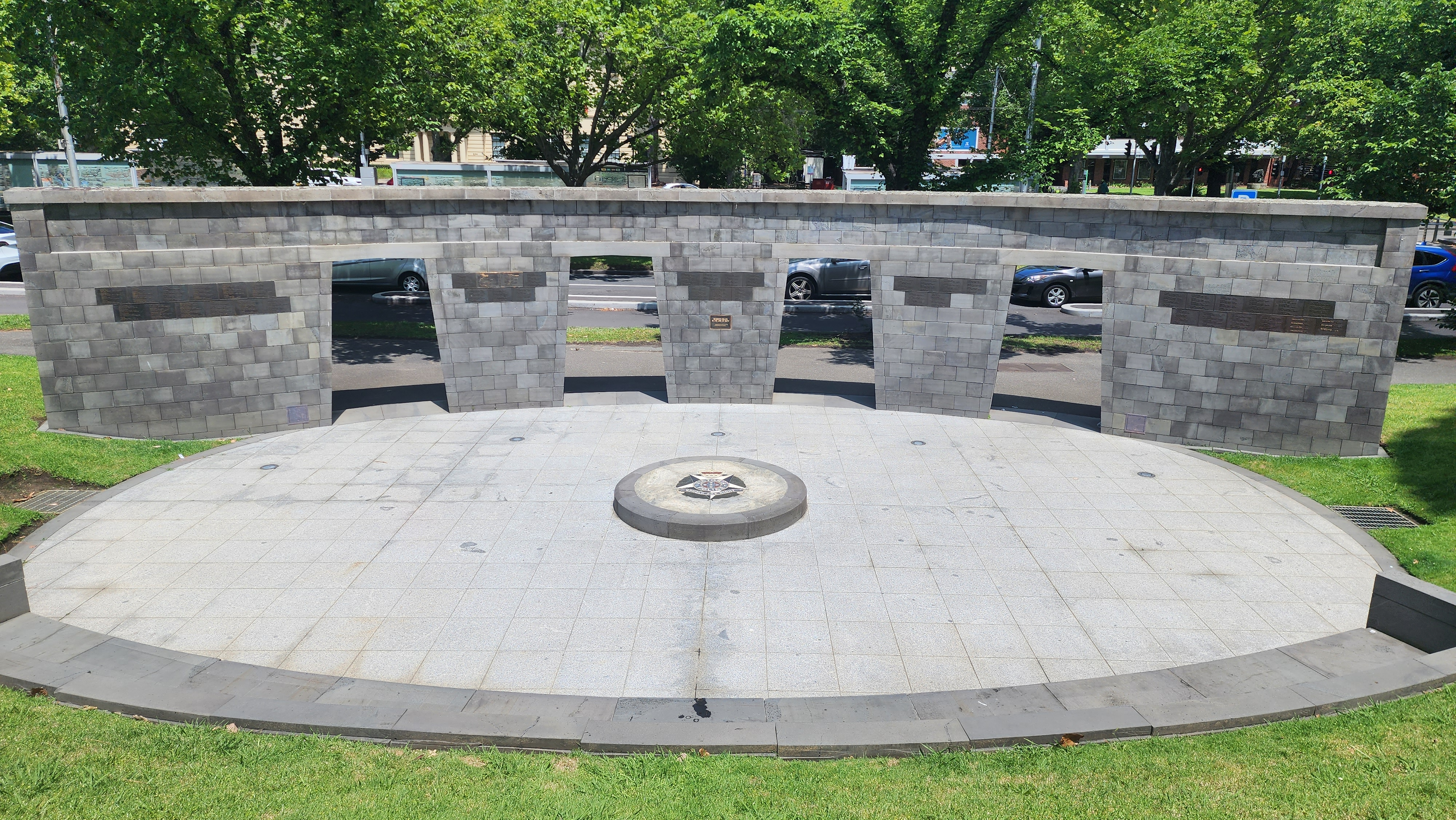
Victoria Police Memorial

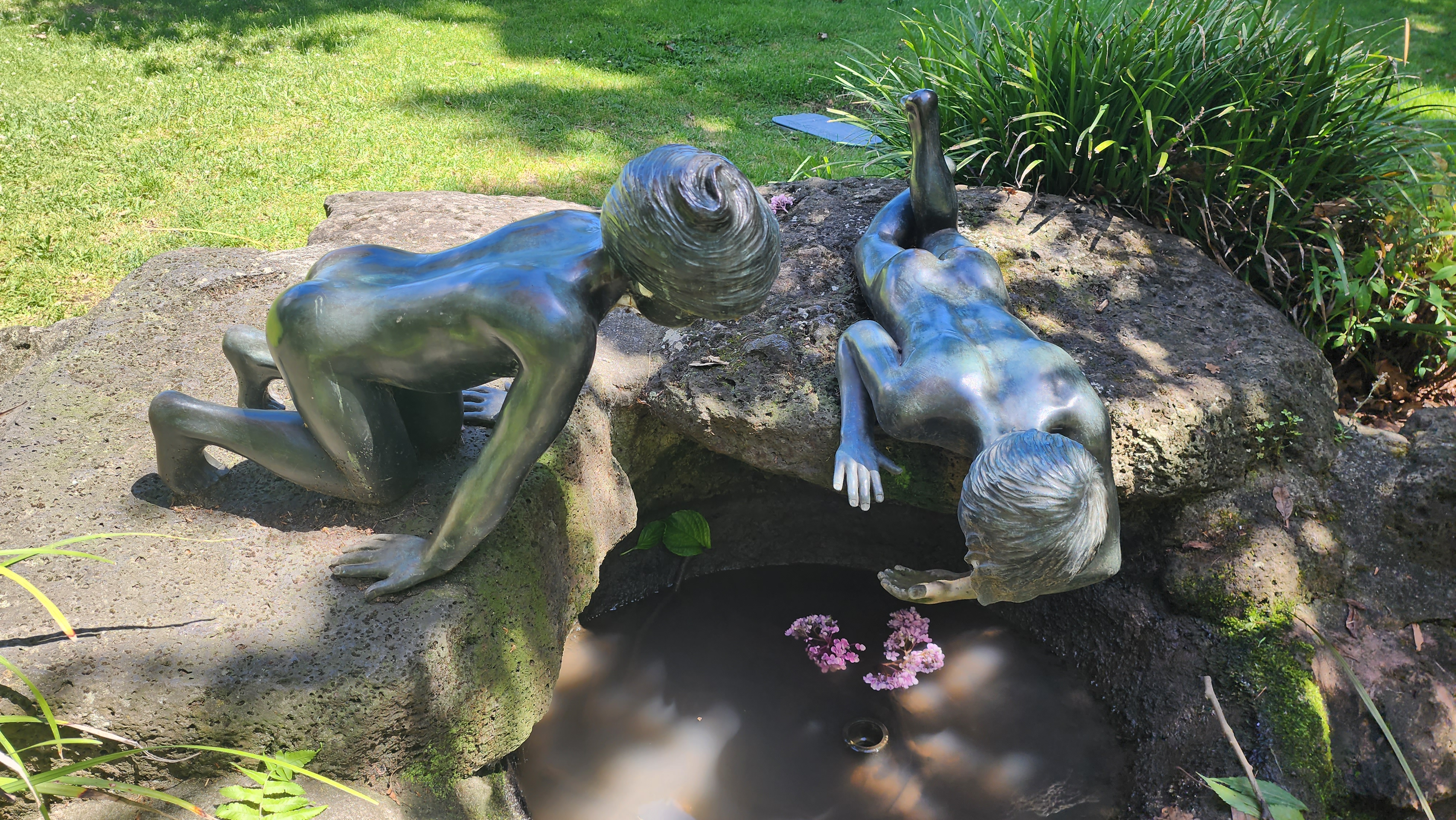
Water Children

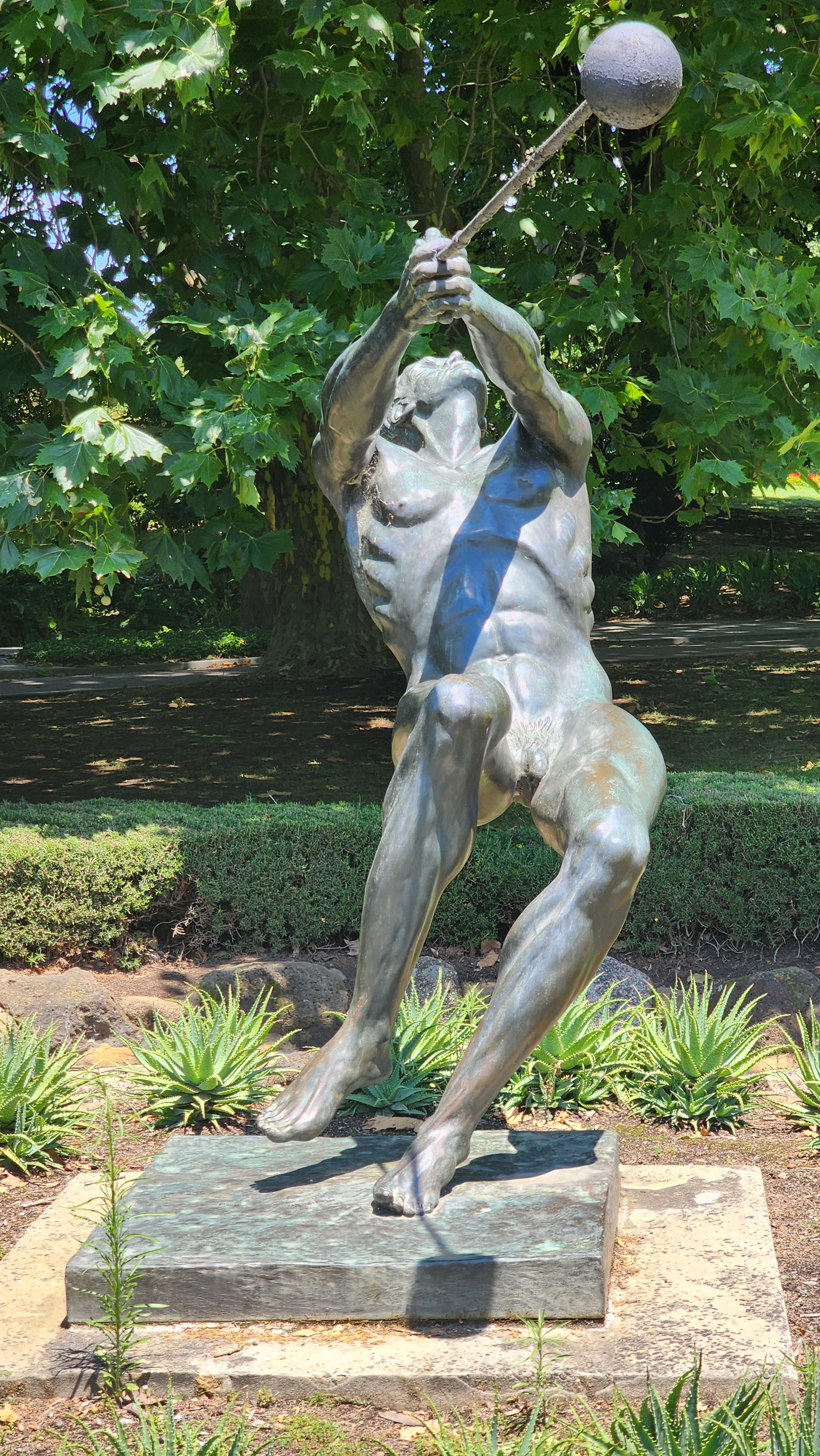
Pathfinder

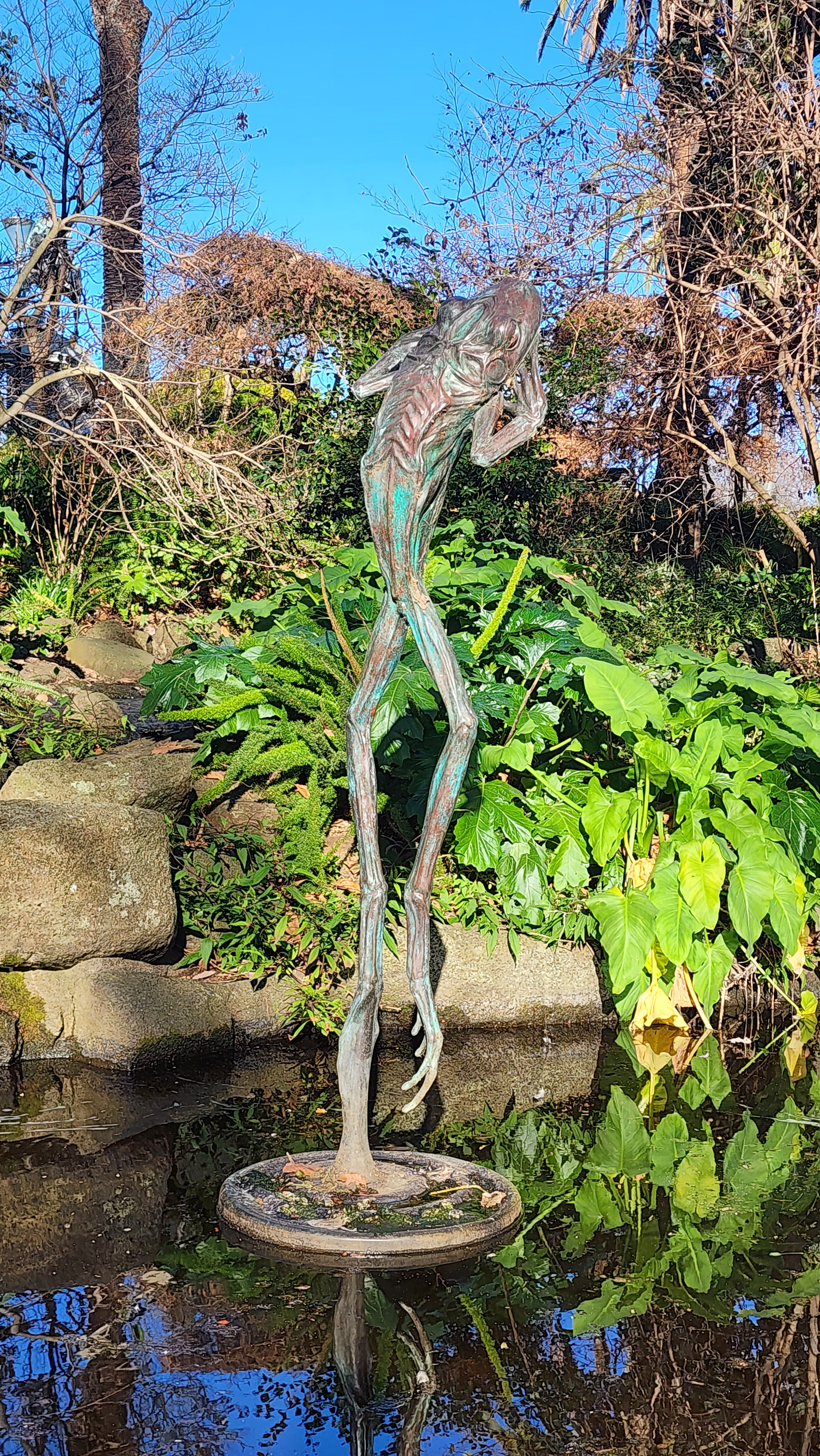
Frog

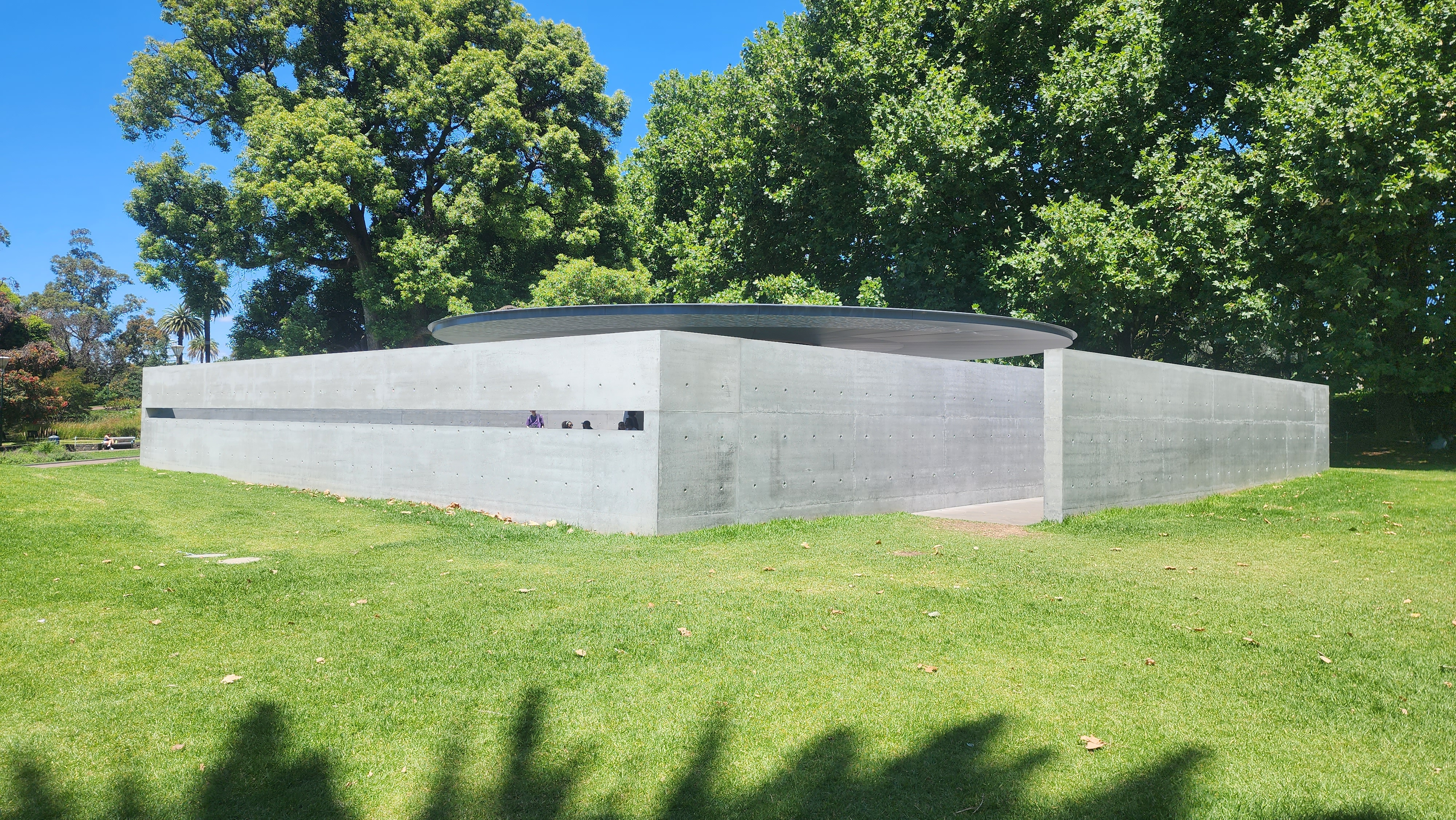
MPavilion (2023)

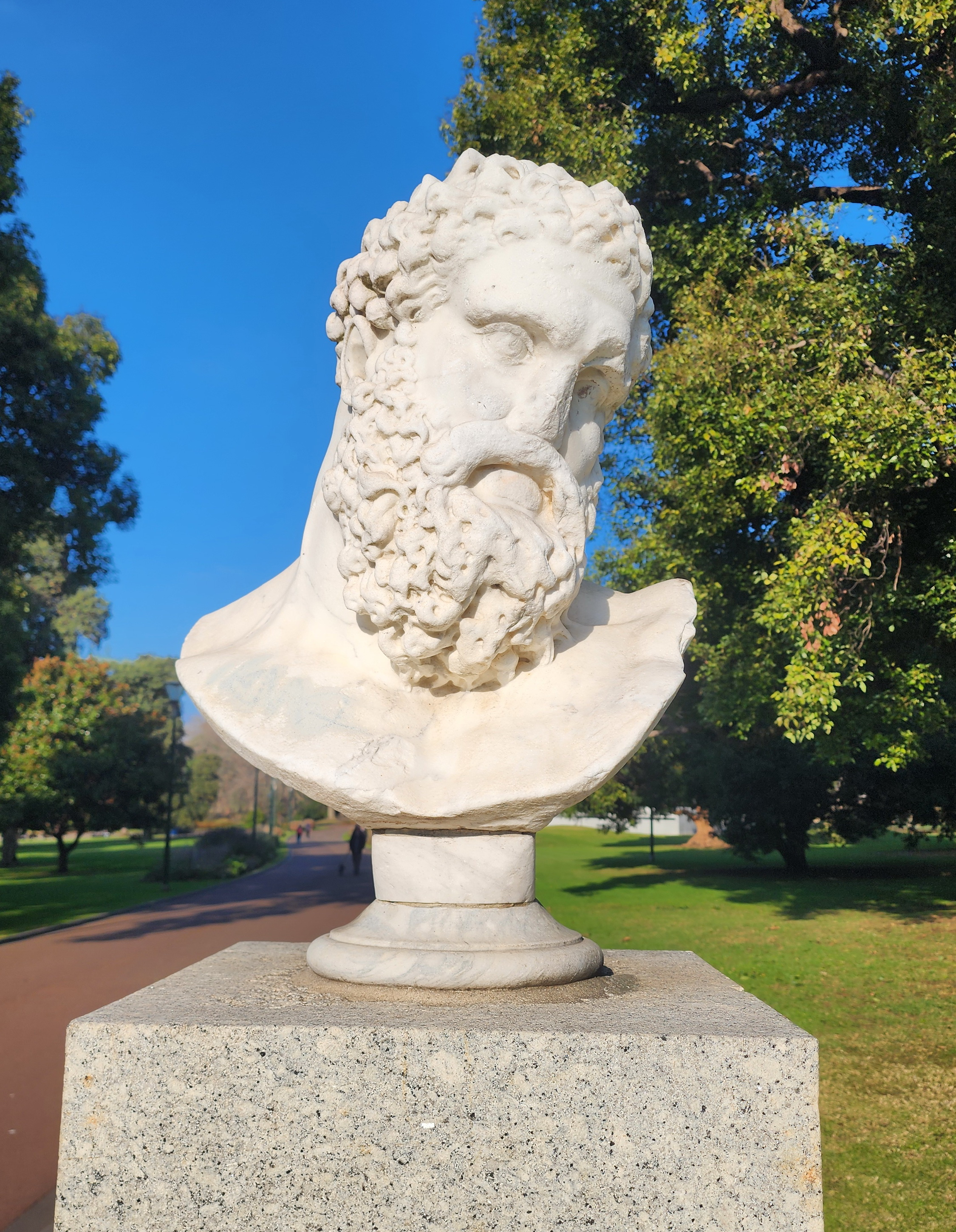
Farnex Hercules

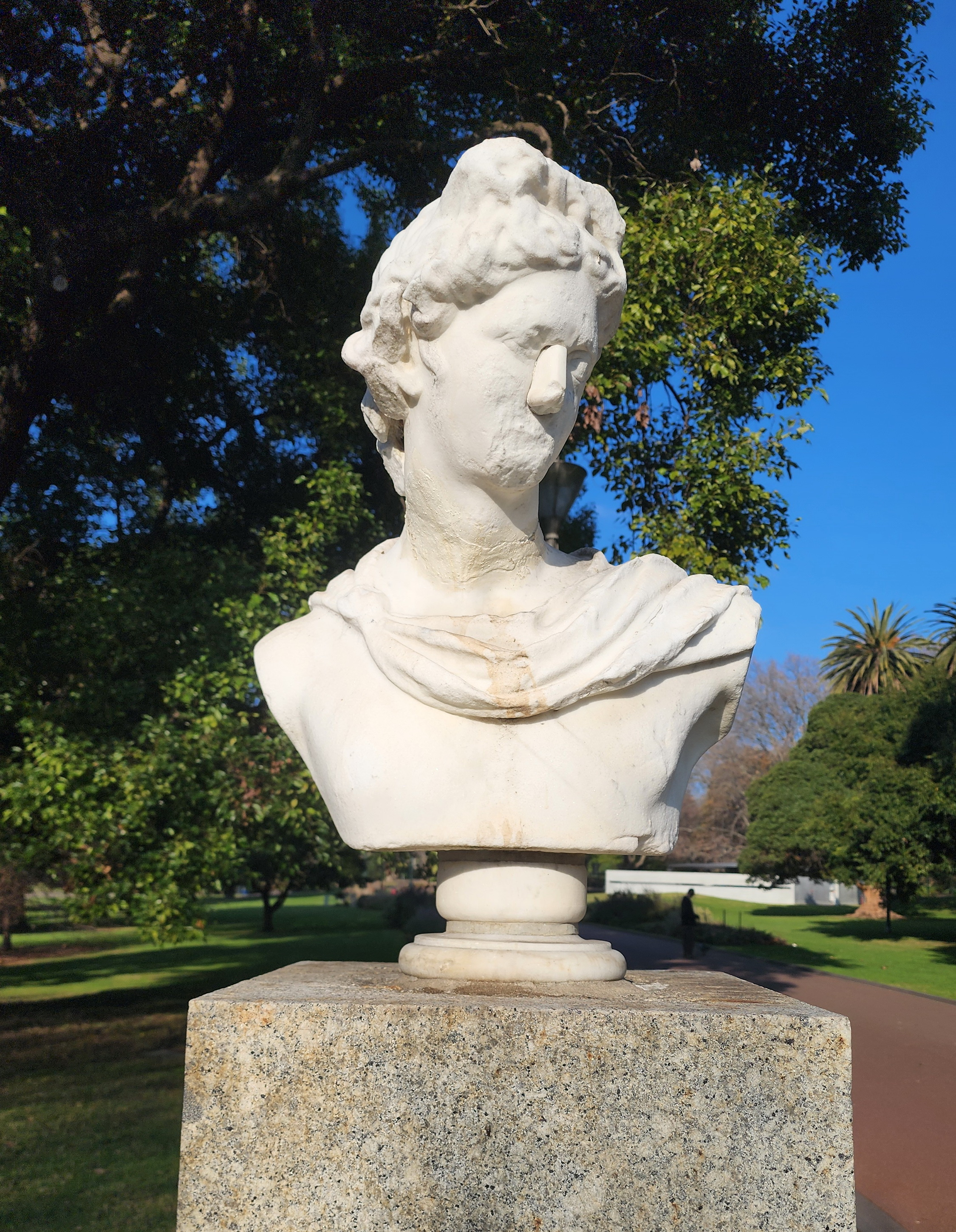
Apollo Belvedere

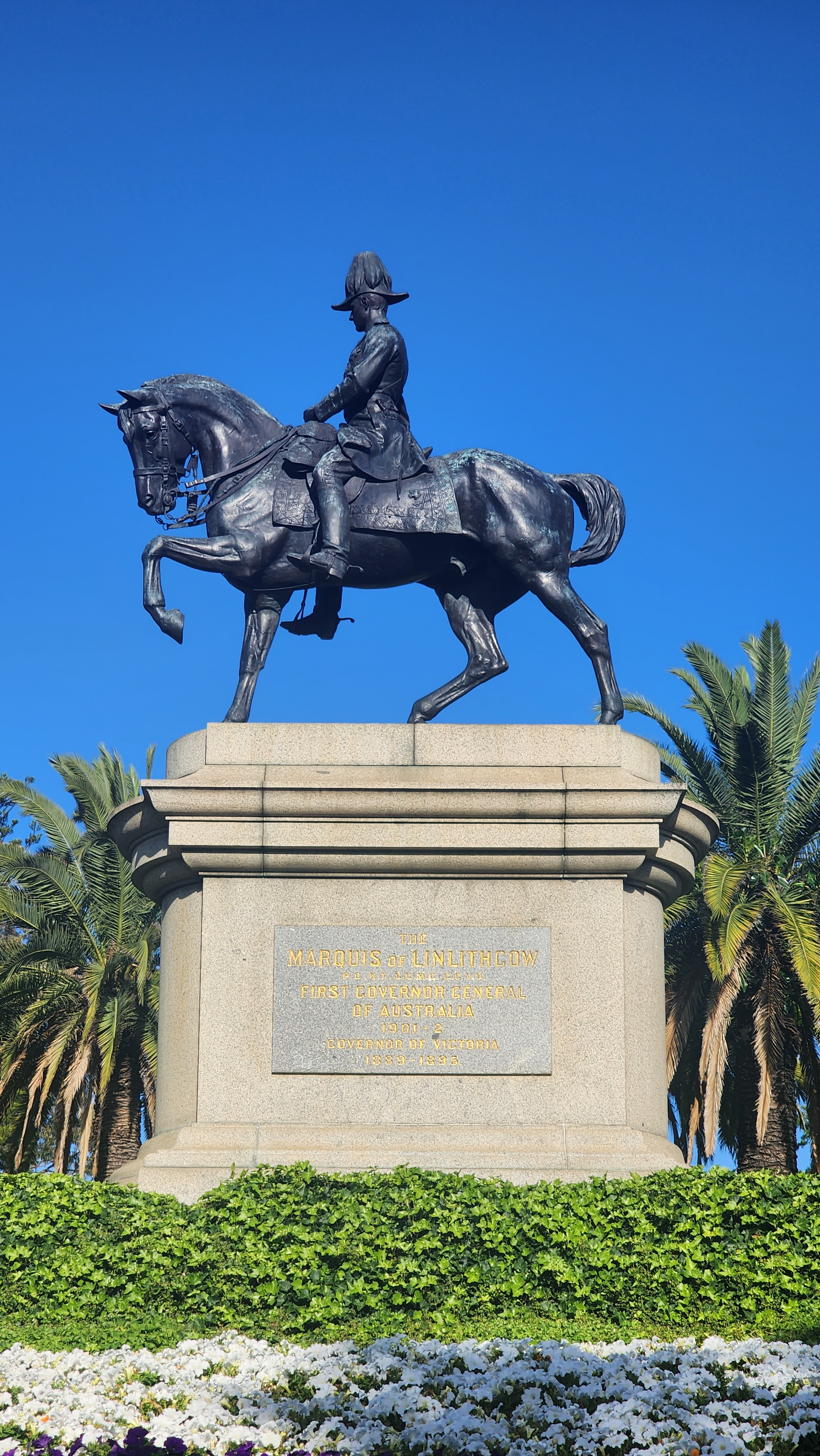
Marquess of Linlithgow Memorial

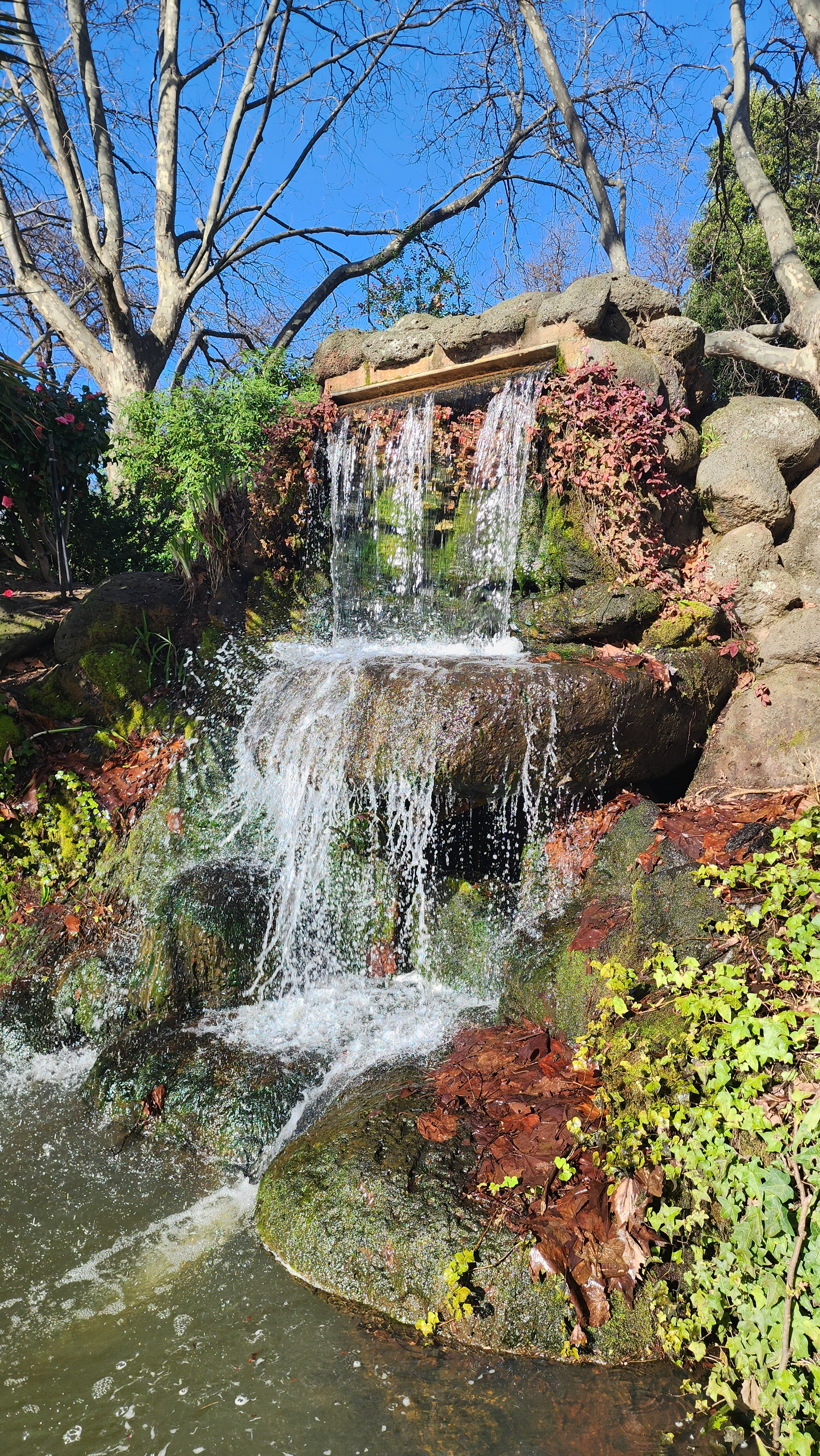
Lake Waterfall

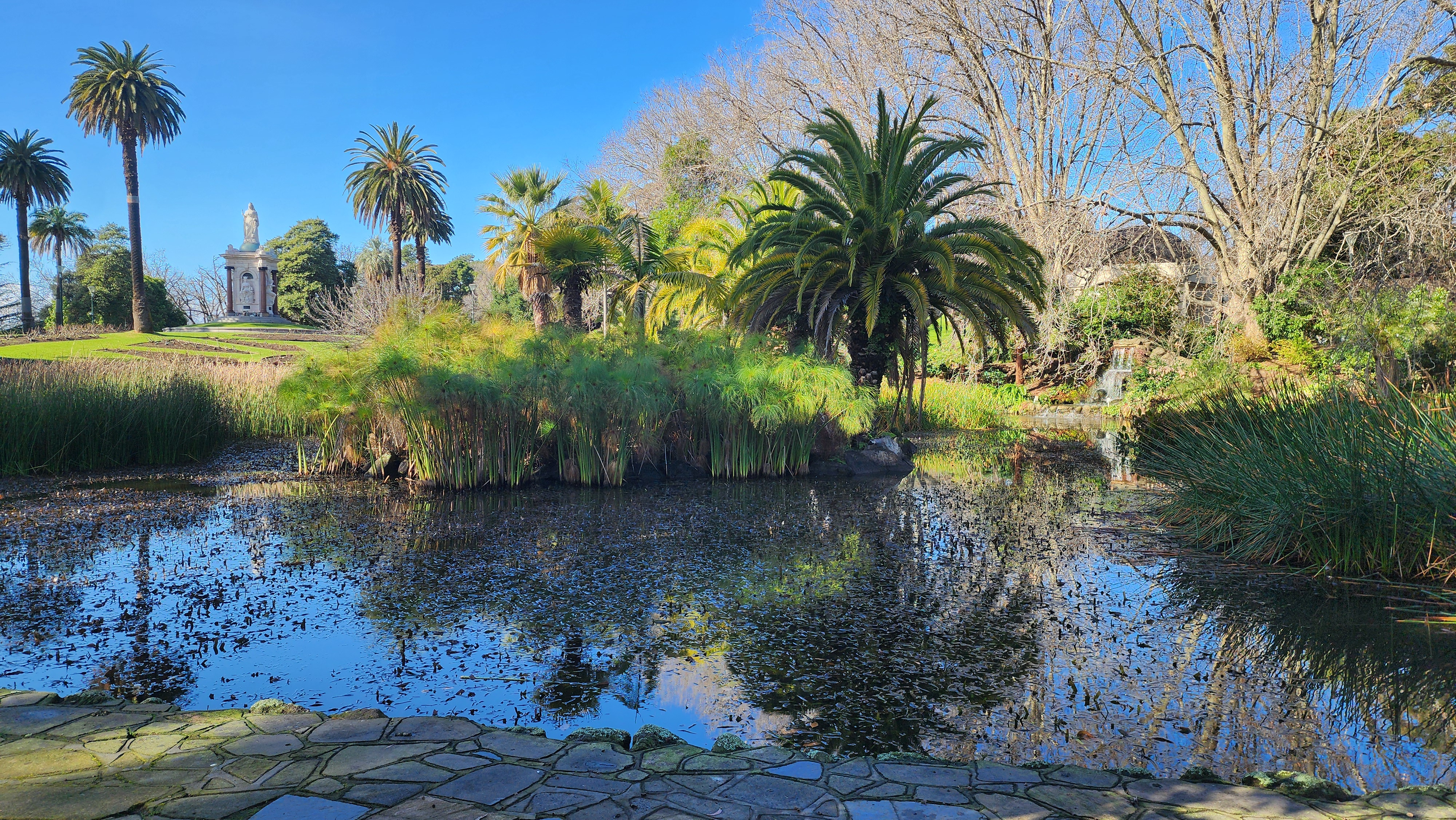
Ornamental lake with Queen Victoria Memorial on the left and Lake Waterfall on the right

== See also ==
- Parks and gardens of Melbourne
- Heritage gardens in Australia
- List of heritage-listed buildings in Melbourne
