= Electoral district of South Bourke =

Colonial electoral district of Victoria, Australia

Coordinates: 37°55′S 145°10′E

South Bourke Victoria—Legislative Assembly
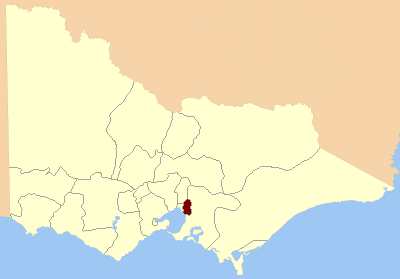
- Location in Victoria
- State: Victoria
- Created: 1856
- Abolished: 1889
- Namesake: Bourke South
- Demographic: Rural

The Electoral district of South Bourke (sometimes Bourke South) was an electoral district of the Legislative Assembly in then Australian colony of Victoria. It was one of the original 37 electoral districts of the Assembly. It covered an area east of Melbourne, bounded by Dandenong Creek in the south and east, Moorabbin, Prahran and Hawthorn in the west and Templestowe in the north. It was abolished in 1889.

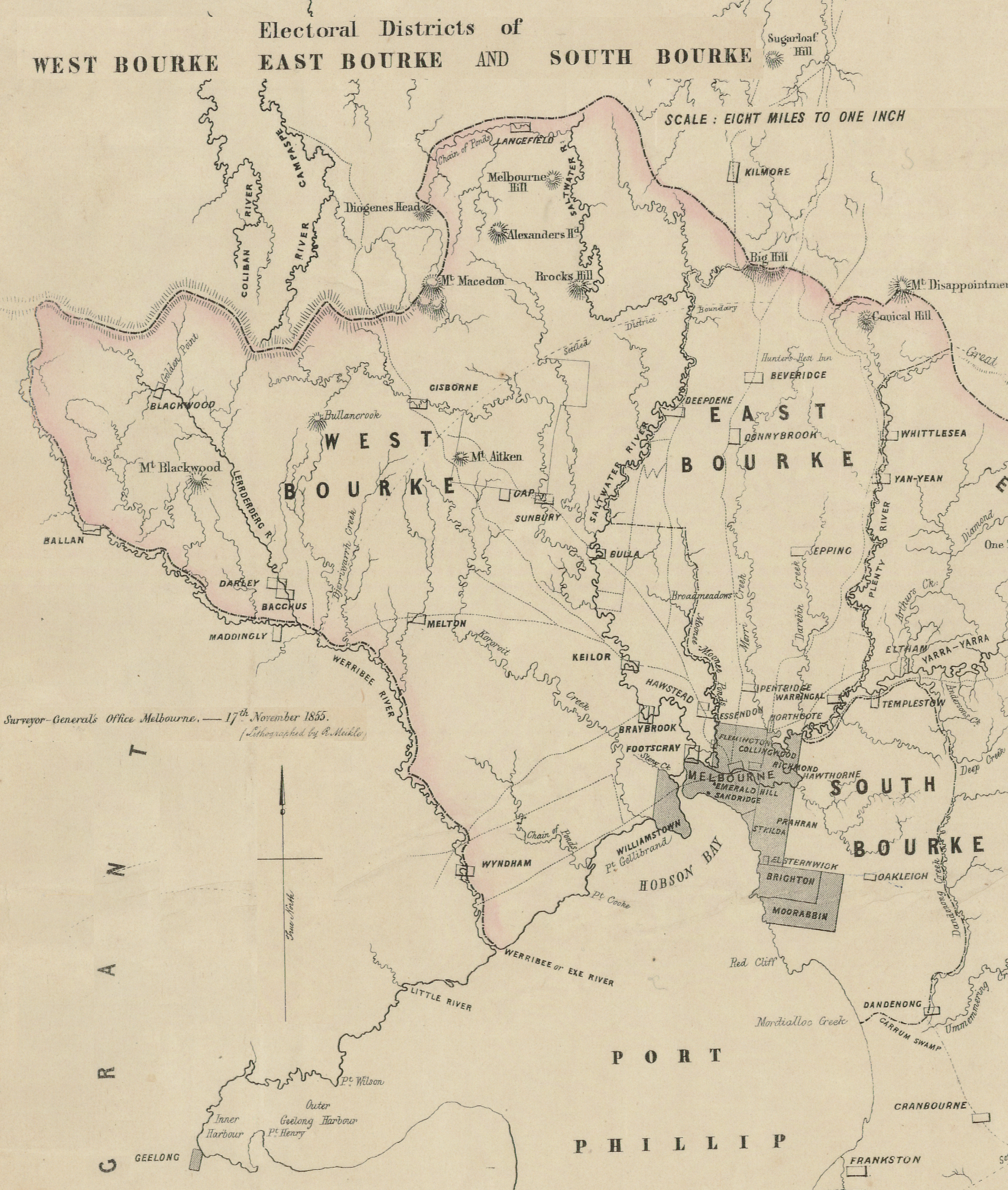
Electoral districts of West Bourke, East Bourke and South Bourke

== Members for South Bourke ==
Two members originally, one after the redistribution of 1877.

Member 1	Term	Member 2	Term
Patrick O'Brien	Nov. 1856 – Aug. 1859	Charles Pasley	Nov. 1856 – July 1857^{[r]}
Patrick O'Brien	Nov. 1856 – Aug. 1859	Sidney Ricardo	July 1857^{[b]} – Aug. 1859
Louis Smith	Oct. 1859 – Dec. 1865	Hibbert Newton	Oct. 1859 – July 1861
George Paton Smith	Feb. 1866 – Jan. 1871	Michael O'Grady	Aug. 1861 – May? 1868
James Fergusson	Apr. 1871 – Mar. 1874	John Crews	May 1868^{[b]} – Apr. 1877
George Paton Smith	May 1874 – Apr. 1877	John Crews	May 1868^{[b]} – Apr. 1877
James Fergusson	May 1877 – Feb. 1880		
John Keys	May 1880 – Mar. 1889		

^{r} = resigned
^{b} = by election

Keys went on to represent the new Electoral district of Dandenong and Berwick from April 1889.
