= Charles Pasley (British Army officer, born 1824) =

Anglo-Australian engineer and politician

Major-General Charles Pasley CB
- Born: 14 November 1824; Brompton Barracks, Chatham, Kent, England
- Died: 11 November 1890 (aged 65); Bedford Park, Chiswick
- Spouse: Charlotte Roberts (m. 1864–)
- Relatives: Charles Pasley (father)
- Military career
- Allegiance: United Kingdom
- Branch: Board of Ordnance; British Army
- Service years: 1843–1881
- Rank: Major-General
- Service number: 742
- Unit: Corps of Royal Engineers
- Commands: CRE, Gravesend, 1861–65
- Campaigns: Eureka Rebellion; Eureka Stockade, 1854; New Zealand Wars; First Taranaki War; Kaihihi pā—Mataiaio, Orongomaihangai, Pukekakariki (WIA), 1860
- Awards: Brevet Major, 1865; New Zealand War Medal; Companion of the Order of the Bath, 1880

Major-General Charles Pasley CB (14 November 1824 – 11 November 1890) was a military engineer of the Corps of Royal Engineers, and Colonial Engineer, Commissioner of Public Works and politician in colonial Victoria.

== Early life ==
Pasley was the son of Lieutenant General Sir Charles Pasley, KCB, and his second wife Martha Matilda née Roberts. He was born at Brompton barracks, Chatham, Kent, England, on 14 November 1824 and was educated at the King's School, Rochester, and the Royal Military Academy, Woolwich from 1840.

== Career ==
Pasley obtained a commission as second lieutenant in the Corps of Royal Engineers on 20 December 1843. He went through the usual course of professional instruction at the military school at Chatham, of which his father was the head, and proved himself so good a surveyor and mathematician that for some months he temporarily held the appointment of instructor in surveying and astronomy. After serving at several home stations he was promoted first lieutenant on 1 April 1846, and in June was sent to Canada. He was employed on the ordinary military duties of his corps until 1848, when he was appointed to assist in the survey of the extensive and scattered ordnance lands on the Rideau Canal. The outdoor survey was done in the winter to enable the surveyors to chain over the frozen lakes, and to avoid the malaria and mosquitoes of the swamps.

In 1849 he was sent to the Bermuda islands, and while there was mainly employed in superintending, on behalf of the colonial government, the work of deepening the channel into St. George's Harbour. In November 1850 he returned to England on account of ill-health.

In February 1851, along with other Royal Engineer officers, he was ordered to join the staff of the Great Exhibition as Superintendent of Classes 24 and 25 (glass and china), with an office in the building.

=== Australia and New Zealand ===
Pasley arrived at Melbourne on 18 September 1853, having been appointed in the spring of that year Colonial Engineer to the Colony of Victoria. He found himself at the head of a considerable department, to which that of Colonial Architect was very soon added, and subsequently that of Central Road Board. In 1854 he was member of a commission to make arrangements for an exhibition of colonial products at the Paris Exhibition in the following year. In October 1854 he was nominated to a seat on the Victorian Legislative Council. About this time the Ballarat riots broke out, and he offered his services to the Governor, Sir Charles Hotham, and was sent to the goldfields on a special mission. In 1855 the new constitution came into force in Victoria, and the first responsible ministry was formed by William Haines in November 1855, General Pasley taking the portfolio of Commissioner of Public Works. On 10 December he was appointed a member of the Executive Council, and a few months later was made by an Act of Council a joint trustee with Captain (later Lieutenant General Sir) Andrew Clarke, RE, for the Melbourne and Mount Alexander Railway, purchased by Government. In 1856 Captain Pasley was elected to the first Victorian Legislative Assembly for South Bourke, and in March 1857 he resigned with the rest of the Ministry, but ultimately consented to remain as professional head of the Department of Public Works.

The Houses of Parliament were amongst the public buildings erected under Pasley's direction, and some of the principal streets of Melbourne were laid out during his term of office. The last public building with which he was connected was the Melbourne Post Office, but this was not completed till after his return to England. Captain Pasley also took great interest in the Botanic Gardens and the Herbarium, which was built under his auspices. In 1860 he resigned his connection with the Public Works Department, with the intention of returning to England; but his interest in the welfare of the Colony of Victoria and of the city of Melbourne was as keen as ever in after years.

Before his departure from the Colony, the New Zealand war broke out, and he immediately offered his services, which were accepted the same day, and he was appointed an extra member of Major General (afterwards Sir) Thomas Pratt's staff. Three months later he was severely wounded by a bullet in the thigh, while in charge of the trenches, after laying out and constructing a parallel needed in the capture of the Kaihihi River pā—Mataiaio, Orongomaihangai and Pukekakariki. His wound proving serious, he became unfit for further duty, and returned to Melbourne invalided. For his services in New Zealand he was mentioned in despatches, and promoted to brevet major, he having become captain soon after his arrival in Melbourne. Pasley also received the New Zealand War Medal.

== Later life ==
Pasley left for England in May 1861, in the steamship Great Britain. He left Melbourne amid popular demonstrations of regret. On arrival in England in August 1861 Pasley was appointed commanding royal engineer at Gravesend. In 1862 he read a paper before the Royal United Service Institution on the operations in New Zealand, to correct some misapprehensions on the subject which existed in the public mind with regard to his old general. On 29 March 1864 he married Charlotte, eldest daughter of the late John Roberts of Barzell, Sussex, at Hampton, Middlesex.

In 1864 he was employed as Acting Agent-General for the Colony of Victoria, a temporary appointment which he held for four years, with leave from the War Office, and afterwards from the Admiralty, to accommodate the colony until they could make a permanent appointment. In this capacity he superintended on behalf of the colony the equipment of HMS Nelson, and the design, construction, armament and despatch of turret ship HMVS Cerberus. He again acted as Agent-General for Victoria from 1880 to 1882. From 1873 to 1882 he held the Imperial appointment of Director of Works of the Navy in succession to Sir Andrew Clarke. Pasley became colonel in April 1876, was appointed by Queen Victoria to be a Companion of the Order of the Bath on 23 April 1880 and retired from the army with the honorary rank of major general in August 1881. General Pasley died at Chiswick, London, on 11 November 1890.

== Publications ==
- Pasley, Charles (March 1863). "The War in New Zealand". Journal of the Royal United Service Institution. 6 (25): 559–594. doi:10.1080/03071846309415831.

Victorian Legislative Council
Preceded by Robert Pohlman	Nominated member 16 October 1854 – March 1856	Original Council abolished
Victorian Legislative Assembly
New district	Member for South Bourke; November 1856 – July 1857; With: Patrick O'Brien	Succeeded by Sidney Ricardo
