= Peter Snodgrass =

Australian politician

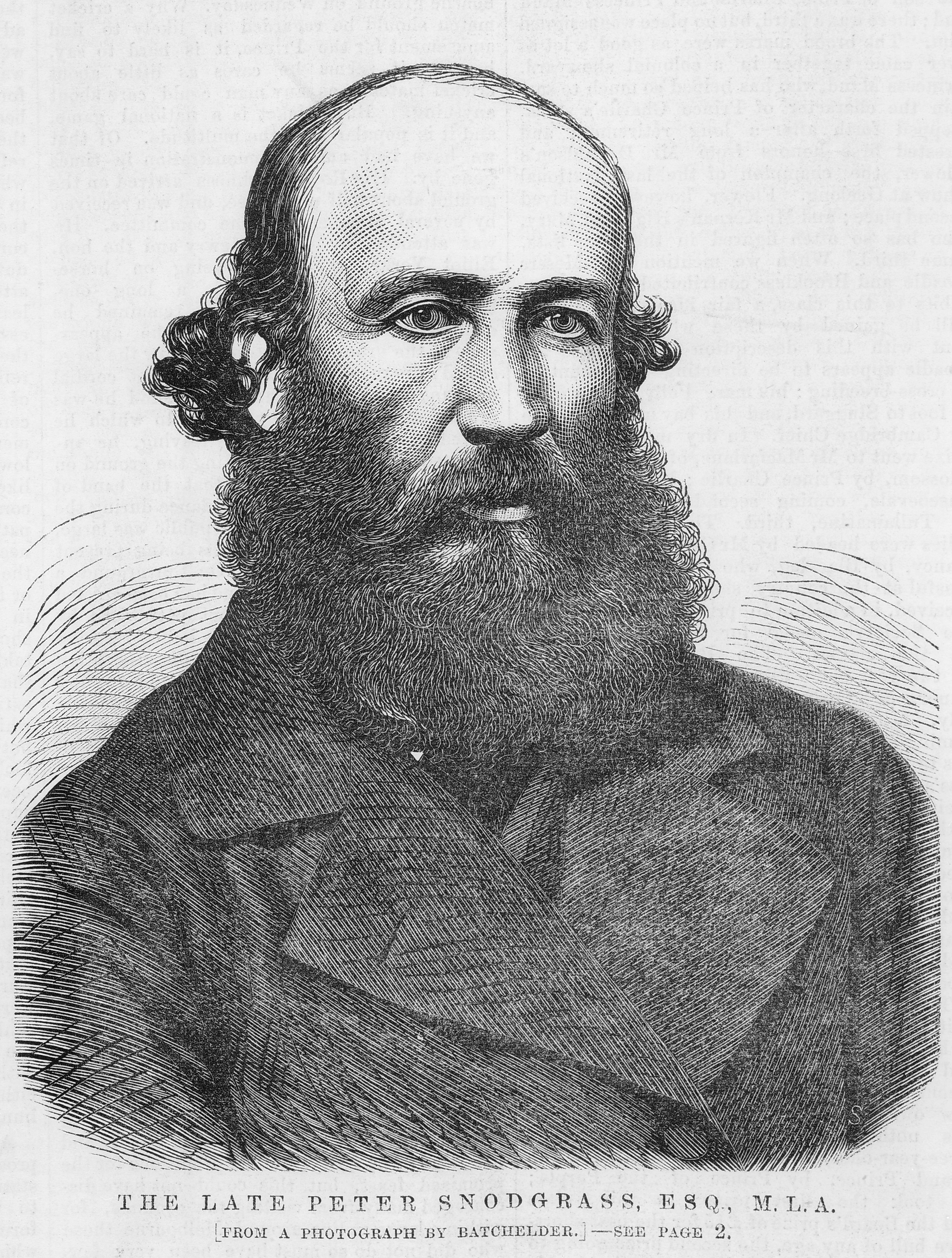

Peter Snodgrass (29 September 1817 – 25 November 1867) was a pastoralist and politician in colonial Victoria, a member of the Victorian Legislative Council, and later, of the Victorian Legislative Assembly.

Snodgrass was born in Portugal and arrived at Sydney, New South Wales, with his parents Lieutenant-Colonel Kenneth Snodgrass (later Lieutenant-Governor of New South Wales) and Janet, née Wright, in December 1828. In 1838, aged 20, Peter Snodgrass travelled over 600 kilometres south from New South Wales as an overland pioneer to the Port Phillip District, becoming a successful pastoralist in what became the state of Victoria. On 8 February 1838 Snodgrass was appointed Commissioner of Crown Lands for the Port Phillip district. Together with William Faithfull, he was responsible for a massacre of aboriginals at Wangaratta in 1838, in the mistaken belief that their gathering for an inter-tribal ceremony for marriage and initiations was in fact a preparation for war against settlers.

On New Year's Day 1840, Snodgrass was involved in a duel with a fellow pastoralist, William Ryrie, which ended farcically after Snodgrass accidentally shot himself in the toe. He was involved in a second duel, in August 1841, with barrister Redmond Barry, during which Snodgrass's pistol again discharged prematurely. On both occasions, Snodgrass's life was spared by the honourable conduct of his opponents, who chose to discharge their pistols harmlessly into the air.

Snodgrass was an early member of the Melbourne Club and a founding trustee of Scot's Church, Melbourne.

Snodgrass was elected a member of the first Victorian Legislative Council on 13 September 1851. and held the seat until the original Council was abolished in 1856. Snodgrass was then elected a member of the first Victorian Legislative Assembly and remained so until his death.

In 1846 he married Charlotte Agnes Cotton, daughter of pastoralist and ornithologist John Cotton. Charlotte survived him with six sons and three daughters. One daughter married Major-General F. G. Hughes. The eldest daughter, Janet Marian, married Sir William Clarke. Snodgrass died in South Yarra, Melbourne, Victoria, of a heart aneurism.

Victorian Legislative Council
| New parliament | Member for Kilmore, Kyneton and Seymour; 1851–1856; Served alongside: Patrick O'Brien (from 1853) | Original Council abolished |
Victorian Legislative Assembly
| New assembly | Member for Anglesey; 1856–1859 | District abolished |
| New district | Member for Dalhousie; 1859–1864 | Succeeded by George John Sands |
| Preceded by John Johnson | Member for South Gippsland; 1864–1867 | Succeeded by Thomas McCombie |
