= John Thomas Smith (British Army officer) =

British colonel in the Royal Engineers

- Born: 16 April 1805
- Died: 14 May 1882 (aged 77); London
- Occupation: Colonel in the Royal Engineers

John Thomas Smith FRS (16 April 1805 – 14 May 1882) was a British colonel in the Royal Engineers.

== Biography ==
Smith was the second son of George Smith of Edwalton, Nottinghamshire, and afterwards of Foëlallt, Cardiganshire, by his wife Eliza Margaret, daughter of Welham Davis, elder brother of the Trinity House. He was born at Foëlallt on 16 April 1805. He was educated at Repton and at the high school, Edinburgh, entered the military college of the East India Company at Addiscombe in 1822, and received a commission as second lieutenant in the Madras engineers on 17 June 1824. He was promoted to be first lieutenant on the following day, and went to Chatham for a course of instruction in professional subjects. Smith left Chatham on 4 February 1825, and arrived at Madras on 2 September of the same year.

On 28 April 1826 Smith was appointed acting superintending engineer in the public works department for the northern division of the presidency, and on 2 May 1828 he was confirmed in the appointment. He thereupon began a series of investigations in reference to lighthouse-lanterns, devising a reciprocating light. Smith suggested to government the improvement of the lighthouse at Hope's Island, off Coringa, and at the end of 1833 his services were placed at the disposal of the marine board, with a view to the improvement of the lighthouse at Madras. On 11 February 1834 ill-health compelled Smith to sail for England on leave of absence. Before his departure the governor in council informed him in very complimentary terms that the marine board had adopted his plans for remodelling the lighthouses both at Madras and at Hope's Island. He was promoted to be captain on 5 March 1835.

Smith remained in England until 28 July 1837, and in the same year he was elected a fellow of the Royal Society. He was given an extension of furlough to superintend the manufacture of apparatus for the Madras lighthouse. He employed his leisure in the translation of J. L. Vicat's valuable treatise on mortars and cements, to which he added the results of many original experiments, and saw the work through the press before leaving for India. It appeared as ‘A Practical and Scientific Treatise on Calcareous Mortars and Cements, Artificial and Natural, with Additions,’ 8vo, London, 1837. On his return to Madras on 13 December 1837 he was appointed to the command of the Madras sappers and miners, but remained at Madras on special duty. On 20 March 1838 he was appointed to the first division of the public works department, comprising the districts of Ganjam, Rajamandry, and Vizagapatam, and on 24 April he took charge of the office of the chief engineer. He served on a committee to inspect and report upon the state of the Red-hill railroad and canal, and he surveyed the Ennore and Pulicat lakes, to ascertain the practicability and cost of keeping open the bar of the Kuam river by artificially closing that of the Ennore river; thereby the whole of the waters collected in the Pulicat lake would be turned into the Kuam, a measure which he considered would afford peculiar facilities for cleansing the Black Town, besides improving the water communication between Madras and Sulurpet. Meanwhile, he superintended the erection of the Madras lighthouse, which was begun in 1838 and completed in 1839. On 5 April 1839 Smith was appointed to the sixth division of the public works department, and on 7 May to officiate as superintending engineer at Madras.

On 24 September 1839 Smith was relieved from all other duties to enable him to inspect and report upon the machinery of the mint at Madras. On 7 February 1840, the date of the re-establishment of the mint, Smith was appointed mint-master, and by a thorough reformation of the whole establishment soon brought the mint into a high state of efficiency. The satisfactory results obtained by Smith's skilful adaptation to steam power of the old and simple mint machinery driven by animal power were referred to in a financial despatch of 16 March 1841 to the court of directors as highly creditable. On 13 January 1846 he visited the Cape of Good Hope on leave of absence, returning to the mint on 28 December 1847. An innovation which Smith introduced of adjusting the weights of the blanks by means of the diameters of the pieces, instead of by their thickness, resulted in his design of a very ingenious and beautiful machine, by which twenty or a hundred blanks could be weighed to half a grain and deposited in a separate cell by a single person with two motions of the hand. After the pieces had been thus sorted they were passed through a set of circular cutters, which removed a certain weight according to the excess of each over the standard. By this means almost the whole of the blanks were obtained of the exact weight without further correction. This machine gained an award at the London International Exhibition of 1851.

Smith was promoted to be major on 2 March 1852, and lieutenant-colonel on 1 August 1854. About this time he made some ingenious inventions, which he proposed to apply to the demolition of Cronstadt; and he also invented a refracting sight for rifles. On 21 Septrember 1855 he was appointed mint-master at Calcutta. The following year he went to England to arrange about copper machinery for the mint, and did not go back, retiring on a pension, with the honorary rank of colonel, on 23 October 1857. After his return to England he devoted himself to currency problems, and favoured the introduction of a gold standard into India. He was deputed to attend the international monetary congress held in Paris in 1865, besides taking active part in the proceedings of many learned societies.

Smith was for a long time consulting engineer to the Madras Irrigation Company; he was also a director of the Delhi bank and of the Madras Railway Company, of which he was for some years chairman. On 17 May 1866 he was appointed a member of the consulting committee, military fund department, at the India office, which post he held until the committee was abolished on 1 April 1880. He died at his residence, 10 Gledhow Gardens, London, on 14 May 1882. Sir Arthur Cotton observes of him: ‘He was one of the most talented, laborious, clear-headed, and sound-judging men I have ever met with, or known of by other means.’ He married, on 27 June 1837, Maria Sarah, daughter of R. Tyser, M.D., by whom he had five sons (for the eldest of whom see below) and eight daughters. A portrait was in possession of his daughter-in-law, Mrs. Percy Smith.

Smith, who was a member of many learned bodies, was author of:

- ‘Observations on the Management of Mints,’ 8vo, Madras, 1848.
- ‘Observations on the Duties and Responsibilities involved in the Management of Mints,’ 8vo, London, 1848.
- ‘Report on the Madras Military Fund, containing New Tables of Mortality, Marriage, &c., deduced from the Fifty Years' Experience, 1808–1858,’ by Smith, in conjunction with S. Brown and P. Hardy.
- ‘Remarks on a Gold Currency for India, and Proposal of Measures for the Introduction of the British Sovereign,’ 8vo, London, 1868.
- ‘Silver and the Indian Exchanges,’ 8vo, London, 1880.

Smith initiated the ‘Professional Papers of the Madras Engineers,’ and edited vols. i. ii. and iii. of ‘Reports, Correspondence, and Original Papers on various Professional Subjects connected with the Duties of the Corps of Engineers, Madras Presidency’ (4to, Madras, printed between 1845 and 1855; the third edition of the first four volumes was printed at the American Press, Madras, in 1859). Smith contributed to these volumes many papers, mainly on mintage and lighthouse construction.

The eldest son, Percy Guillemard Llewellin Smith was an officer in the Royal Engineers.
