= Rupert Clarke =

Rupert Clarke may refer to:

- Rupee (musician), Barbadian reggae musician, born Rupert Clarke
- one of three Australian Clarke baronets of Rupertswood, all named Rupert Clarke
  - Sir Rupert Clarke, 2nd Baronet (1865–1926)
  - Sir Rupert Clarke, 3rd Baronet (1919–2005)
  - Sir Rupert Clarke, 4th Baronet (born 1947)
