= Sir Rupert =

Sir Rupert may refer to:

- Sir Rupert Bromley (born 1936), retired businessman
- Sir Rupert Clarke (1920-2005), decorated soldier, businessman and pastoralist
- Sir Rupert Clarke (Senior) (1865-1926), 2nd Baronet of Rupertswood
- Sir Rupert Grant Alexander Clarke (born 1947), son of Sir Rupert Clarke
- Sir Rupert Hart-Davis (1907-1999), British publisher, literary editor, and man of letters
- Sir Rupert Mackeson, 2nd Baronet (born 1941), British author
