= Sunbury visitor information centre =

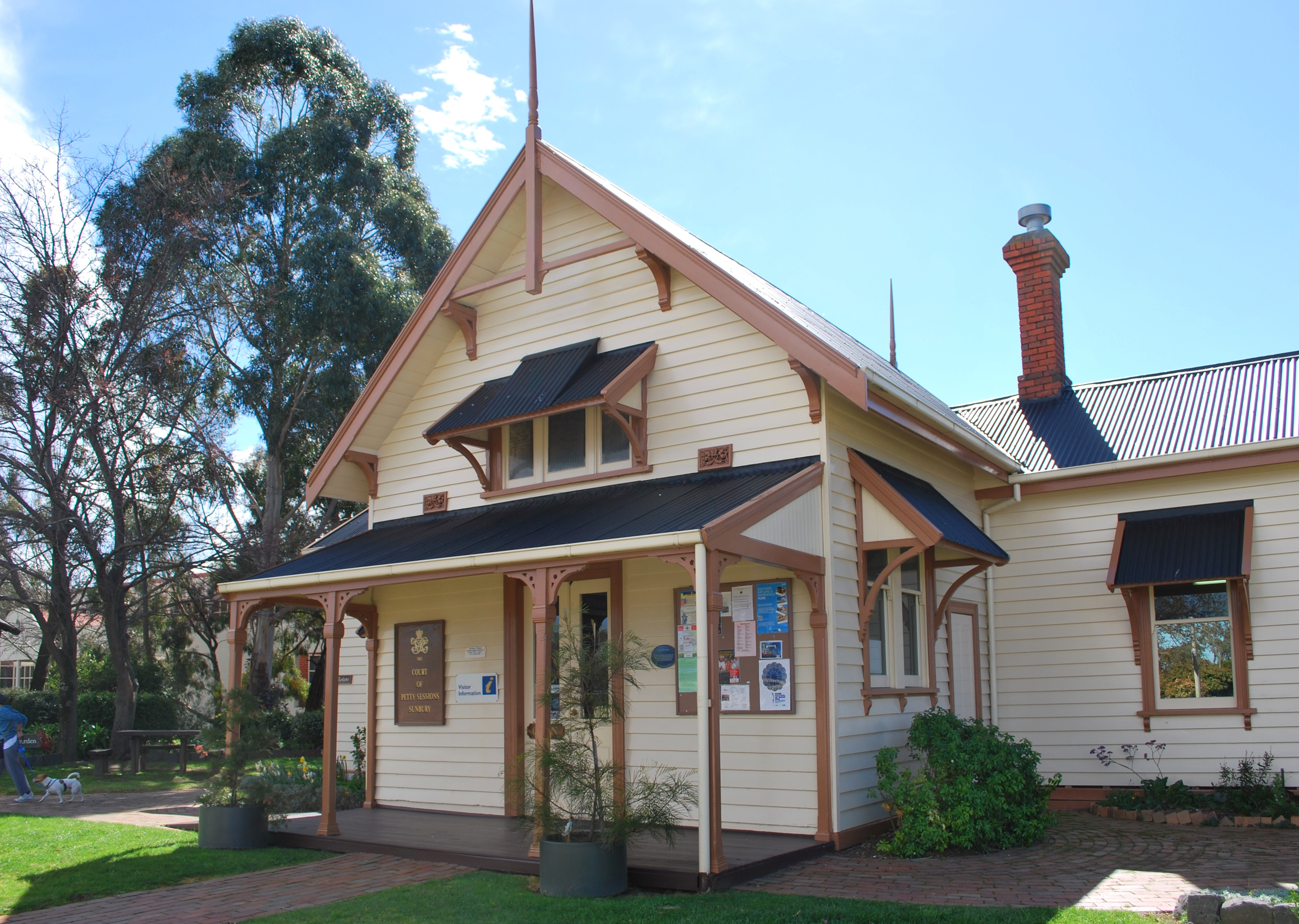
Sunbury Visitor Information Centre (The old Court of Petty Sessions)

The Sunbury visitor information centre is located at 43 Macedon St, Sunbury VIC 3429. (in The old Court of Petty Sessions).

== History and Tourism ==
Containing much historical information pertaining to Sunbury's history, historical places in Sunbury and also Sunbury's tourist sites. Including brochures and detailed information including: The Ashes and Sunbury as the birthplace of the ashes. Harry Houdini's First Flight in Diggers Rest The Sunbury Pop Festival and much more.

The Sunbury visitor information centre also has a video hologram display with Firsty (Sunbury's own animated character) explaining many of Sunbury's firsts.

== See also ==
- Sunbury, Victoria
- The Ashes Sunbury The Birthplace of The Ashes
- Harry Houdini
- Rupertswood
- Salesian College
- Sunbury Pop Festival
