= Clarke baronets of Rupertswood (1882) =

Escutcheon of the Clarke baronets of Rupertswood

The Clarke Baronetcy, of Rupertswood in the Colony of Victoria, was created in the Baronetage of the United Kingdom on 29 December 1882 for the Australian landowner and philanthropist William Clarke.

The Clarke family was originally from Weston Zoyland, Somerset. William John Turner Clarke, father of the 1st Baronet, settled in Australia in 1829. He was a member of the Legislative Council of Victoria.

== Clarke baronets, of Rupertswood (1882) ==
- Sir William John Clarke, 1st Baronet (1831–1897)
- Sir Rupert Turner Havelock Clarke, 2nd Baronet (1865–1926)
- Sir Rupert William John Clarke, 3rd Baronet (1919–2005)
- Sir Rupert Grant Alexander Clarke, 4th Baronet (born 1947)

The heir apparent to the baronetcy is Rupert Robert William Clarke (born 1981), only son of the 4th Baronet.

== Extended family ==
Sir Francis Grenville Clarke (1879–1955), fourth son of the 1st Baronet, was President of the Legislative Council of Victoria between 1923 and 1943.

== Residences ==
=== Country homes ===
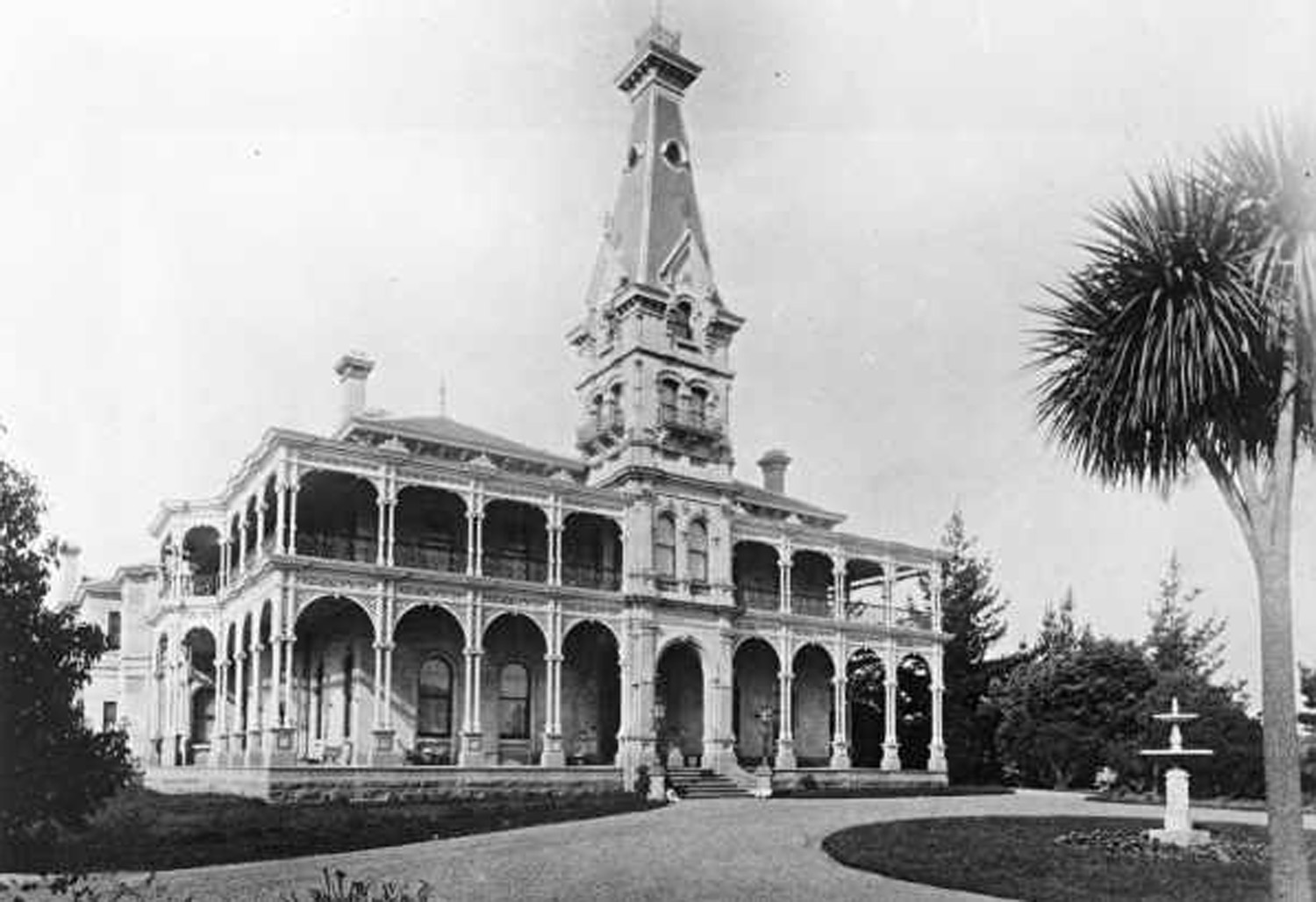
Rupertswood, c. 1890

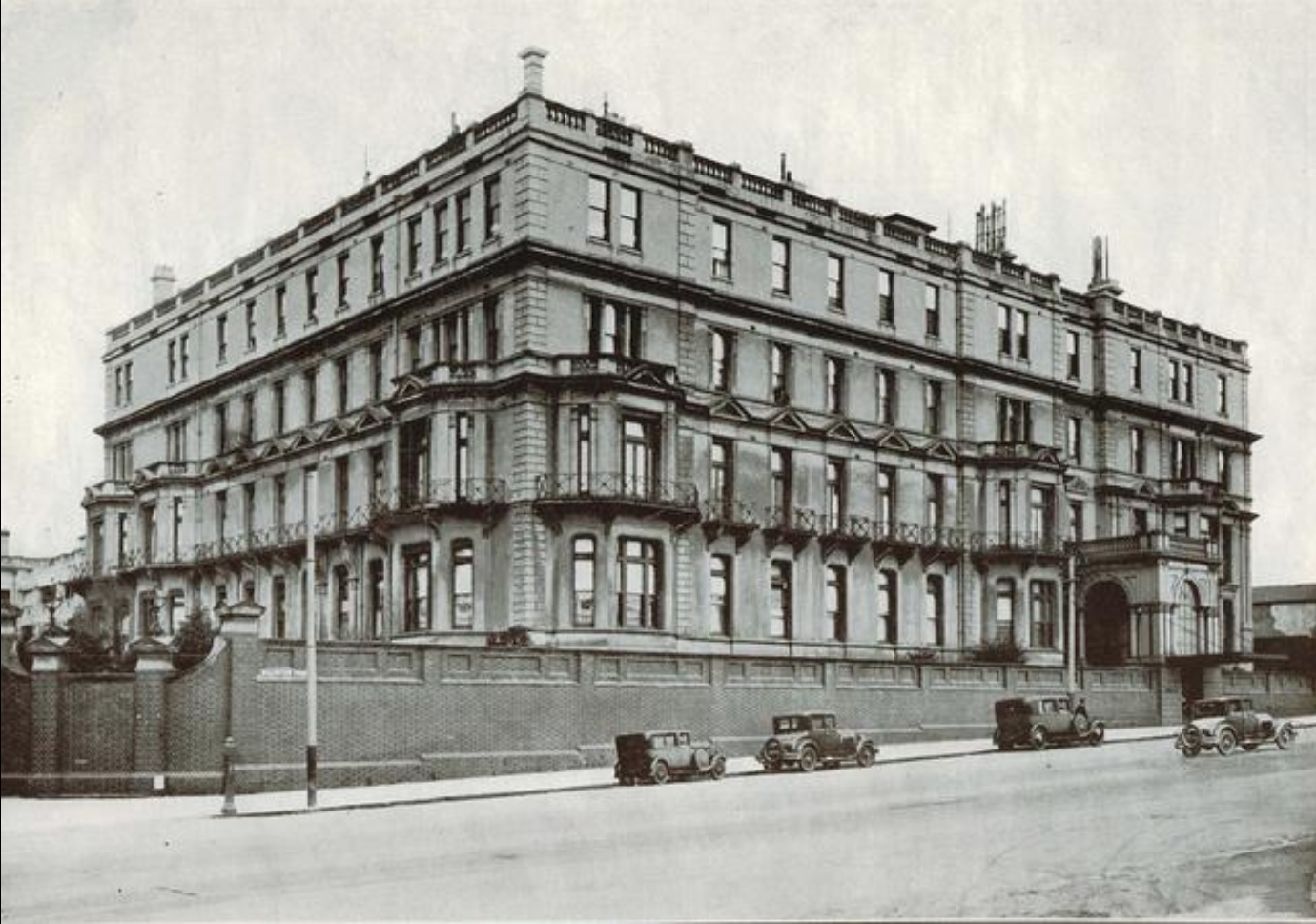
Cliveden c. 1930 (with an additional floor added after the conversion of the building into apartments)

The family seat is the Bolinda Vale estate in the Shire of Macedon Ranges, currently the home of the 4th Baronet and his wife.

Former seats include Rupertswood House near Sunbury, Victoria, which was held within the family from its construction in 1876 until 1922. The 1st Baronet bequeathed Rupertswood to his eldest son and heir, who later sold the property to a younger son of the 1st Baronet, William Lionel Clarke; he in turn sold the property to the industrialist Hugh Victor McKay.

=== Melbourne ===
During the late Nineteenth Century Sir William Clarke, 1st Baronet oversaw the construction of a large town residence in Melbourne a cost of £91,000. Following its completion in 1888 the property was given the name Cliveden, and was reportedly the largest private residence in the city at the time of its construction.

Following the death of the 1st Baronet in 1897, Cliveden was bequeathed to his widow, Janet, Lady Clarke, who continued to occupy the property under her death in 1909. Her executors later sold Cliveden for £22,000. The building was later converted into luxury apartments.

In 1962 Kathleen, Lady Clarke (wife of Sir Rupert Clarke, 3rd Baronet) purchased the historic house "Pately" at No. 56 Avoca Street, South Yarra for £25,000; the house, briefly renamed as "Lindisfarne" during the 1890s, had been constructed in 1859 and significantly extended during the 1860s. Sir Rupert and Lady Clarke renamed the property Richmond House in acknowledgement of Lady Clarke's father's business interests, and Richmond House served as the family's town residence in Melbourne for the remainder of the 20th century. Following Lady Clarke's death in 1999, Richmond House was sold to Melbourne stockbroker Michael Kirwan for $3.7 million.

Male-line descent and line of succession
- Sir William John Clarke, 1st Baronet (1831–1897)
  - Sir Rupert Turner Havelock Clarke, 2nd Baronet (1865–1926)
    - Sir Rupert William John Clarke, 3rd Baronet (1919–2005)
      - Sir Rupert Grant Alexander Clarke, 4th Baronet (b. 1947)
        - (1) Rupert Robert William Clarke (b. 1981)
      - Ernest William Grant Clarke (1949 – 1961)
      - (2) Peter Robert Justin John Clarke (b. 1955)
        - (3) William Peter Norman Clarke (b. 1986)
    - Ernest Edward Dowling Clarke (1920–1940)
  - Ernest Edward Dowling Clarke (1869–1941)
  - Clive Snodgrass Clarke (1873–1894)
  - William Lionel Russell Clarke (1876–1954)
    - John Russell Clarke (1909–1963)
      - Timothy Ian Russell Clarke (1935–1939)
    - Michael Alastair Clarke (1915–2002)
  - Sir Francis Grenville Clarke (1879–1955)
    - John Holywell Clarke (1902–1918)
    - William Antony Francis Clarke (1908–1953)
      - (4) Francis Brookes Clarke (b. 1940)
        - (5) Antony Graham Clarke (b. 1971)
      - (6) William Severn Clarke (b. 1945)
  - Colin Grenville Clarke (1914–1962)
    - (7) Jason William Clarke (b. 1952)
  - Reginald Hastings Clarke (1880–1914)
    - Reginald Clive Neville Clarke (1910–1964)
      - Robin Clive Macpherson Clarke (1935–2015)
        - (8) Anthony Clive Clarke (b. 1963)

== Notes ==
Baronetage of the United Kingdom
Preceded by Ellis baronets	Clarke baronets of Rupertswood; 29 December 1882	Succeeded by Wells baronets
