= Ralph Waldo Emerson MacIvor =

Ralph Waldo Emerson MacIvor (c. 1852 – 1 April 1917) was a United Kingdom agricultural chemist, active in Australia, New Zealand and Scotland.

MacIvor was educated in the United Kingdom, he became an Associate of the Institute of Chemistry in 1878 and a Fellow in 1883.

The Australian pastoralist William John Clarke paid MacIvor to lecture on agricultural chemistry in the colony of Victoria.

== Publications ==
- MacIvor, Ralph W. Emerson, The Chemistry of Agriculture, Stillwell, Melbourne, 1879, 275 pp
- MacIvor, Ralph Waldo Emerson, 'MacIvor's Improved Method of Disposing of and Utilizing Night-soil, and Extracting therefrom, and Converting the Same into, Merchantable Commodities (Patent: 20 March 1886)', in Index to New South Wales Letters of Registration of Inventions, 1854 to July 1887, Government Printer, Sydney, 1891, p. 27.
