= Tom Sheridan (footballer) =

Australian rules footballer (born 1993)

Personal information
- Full name: Tom Sheridan
- Nickname: Train
- Born: 28 October 1993 (age 33)
- Original team: Calder Cannons (TAC Cup)
- Draft: No. 16, 2011 national draft
- Height: 187 cm (6 ft 2 in)
- Weight: 82 kg (181 lb)
- Position: Defender

Playing career^{1}
Years	Club	Games (Goals)
2012–2018	Fremantle	81 (31)
2019–2020	Greater Western Sydney	2 (0)
Total		83 (31)
- ^{1} Playing statistics correct to the end of 2020.

Tom Sheridan (born 28 October 1993) is a former Australian rules footballer who played in the Australian Football League (AFL) for Fremantle and Greater Western Sydney Giants between 2012 and 2020.

== Early career ==
Originally from Riddells Creek, Victoria, Sheridan attended Salesian College in Sunbury and later Essendon Keilor College as part of their elite football program. He played junior representative football for the Calder Cannons in the TAC Cup. He showed his endurance at the AFL pre-draft testing, finishing in the top two percent of participants in the beep test and 3 km run. He represented Victoria Metro at the 2011 AFL Under 18 Championships and was named in the TAC Cup Team of the Year. He was drafted by Fremantle with their first selection, 16th overall, in the 2011 AFL draft.

== AFL career ==
Sheridan played his first game for Fremantle in the final round of the 2012 AFL season against the Melbourne Football Club after performing well in the West Australian Football League (WAFL) for Peel Thunder.

He was delisted by Fremantle at the end of the 2018 season, however shortly afterwards Greater Western Sydney picked him up as a delisted free agent for the 2019 season.

Sheridan retired from AFL in September 2020.

== Statistics ==
Statistics are correct to the end of the 2016 season

Legend
G	Goals	K	Kicks	D	Disposals	T	Tackles
B	Behinds	H	Handballs	M	Marks

Season	Team	No.	Games	Totals							Averages (per game)						
Season	Team	No.	Games	G	B	K	H	D	M	T	G	B	K	H	D	M	T
2012	Fremantle	11	1	0	0	3	2	5	1	1	0.0	0.0	3.0	2.0	5.0	1.0	1.0
2013	Fremantle	11	10	6	1	65	53	118	26	19	0.6	0.1	6.5	5.3	11.8	2.6	1.9
2014	Fremantle	11	8	4	2	35	41	76	11	20	0.5	0.2	4.4	5.1	9.5	1.4	2.5
2015	Fremantle	11	19	4	2	207	130	337	71	43	0.2	0.1	10.9	6.8	17.7	3.7	2.3
2016	Fremantle	11	21	6	2	225	169	394	77	45	0.3	0.1	10.7	8.0	18.8	3.7	2.1
Career			59	20	7	535	395	930	186	128	0.3	0.1	9.1	6.7	15.8	3.2	2.2

== Post-football ==
Sheridan is a co-founder of Rixx Eyewear, a sunglasses retailer.
