= Salesian College (Rupertswood) =

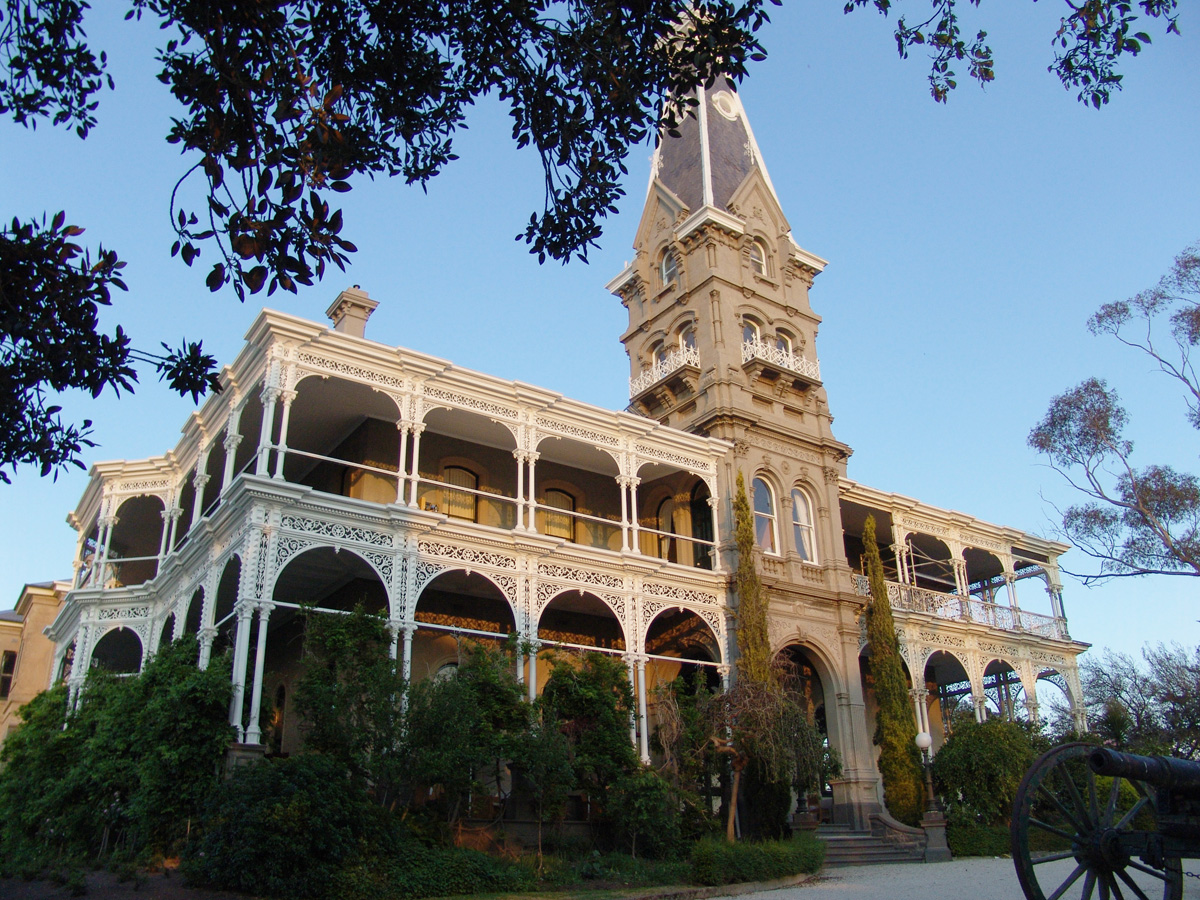
- Rupertswood, located adjacent to Salesian College's main school buildings

Location
- Sunbury, Victoria; Australia; 37°34′22″S 144°44′19″E

Information
- Type: Independent secondary school
- Religious affiliation: Roman Catholic
- Denomination: Salesian Society
- Established: 1929; 97 years ago
- Years: 7–12
- Website: www.scr.vic.edu.au

Salesian College is an independent Roman Catholic, co-educational secondary school located in Sunbury, Victoria, Australia. The college is a member of the Sports Association of Catholic Co-educational Secondary Schools (SACCSS).

== History ==
The school was established by the Salesian Society in 1927, when Rupertswood Mansion, one of the largest private houses in Victoria, originally constructed for Sir William Clarke, was purchased from the estate of industrialist H. V. McKay.

Salesian College was originally an all-boys boarding school. The Salesian order's charism meant that "under-privileged" boys were included as boarders, particularly in the college's early decades. In the 1950s, the school began admitting day students as well as boarders. After the nearby town of Sunbury grew in the 1980s, girls were admitted. By 1997, the school had become fully co-educational and had ceased student boarding.

The college is now located on the grounds of the mansion, which is listed on the Victorian Heritage Register.

The school was exclusively served by the adjacent Rupertswood railway station, originally provided for Sir William Clarke, from 1962 until its closure in 2004.

== Sexual abuse convictions ==
There have been a number of convictions related to sexual abuse by teachers and priests at the school, particularly in regard to offences committed in the 1970s and 80s, including: Michael Aulsebrook, gaoled for the sexual abuse of a 12-year-old student in 1983; and again in 2016 for rape, sexual assaults Peter Paul van Ruth, who was sentenced to 28 months gaol in 2011 for indecently assaulting two 12-year-old boys; and Frank Klep, a former principal of the college who "...was convicted in 1994 of four charges of sexual assault relating to incidents during the 1970s."

Other priests from the college reached settlements with substantial compensation payments paid to their victims, over allegations of sexual abuse, but were not otherwise convicted.

On 30 August 2013, David Rapson, a former vice principal, was found guilty of eight indecent assaults and five rapes committed against students at Salesian College between the mid-1970s and 1990. That conviction was then quashed and he was retried. At the retrial he was found guilty of multiple accounts of sexual abuse and was given a 12-year prison sentence.

Julian Benedict Fox, the former head of the Salesians in Australia, and a past teacher at Salesian College Rupertswood in Sunbury, pleaded guilty on 28 August 2015 to three counts of common assault, related to beating three other boys with a pool cue at Salesian College in 1978 and 1979.

== 'Keyboard Klub Klass' Incident ==
In July, 2025, Salesian College Sunbury introduced a new club to its college's extra-curricular activities named 'Keyboard Klub Klass' designed to be an introductory course to teach students how to play the Keyboard.

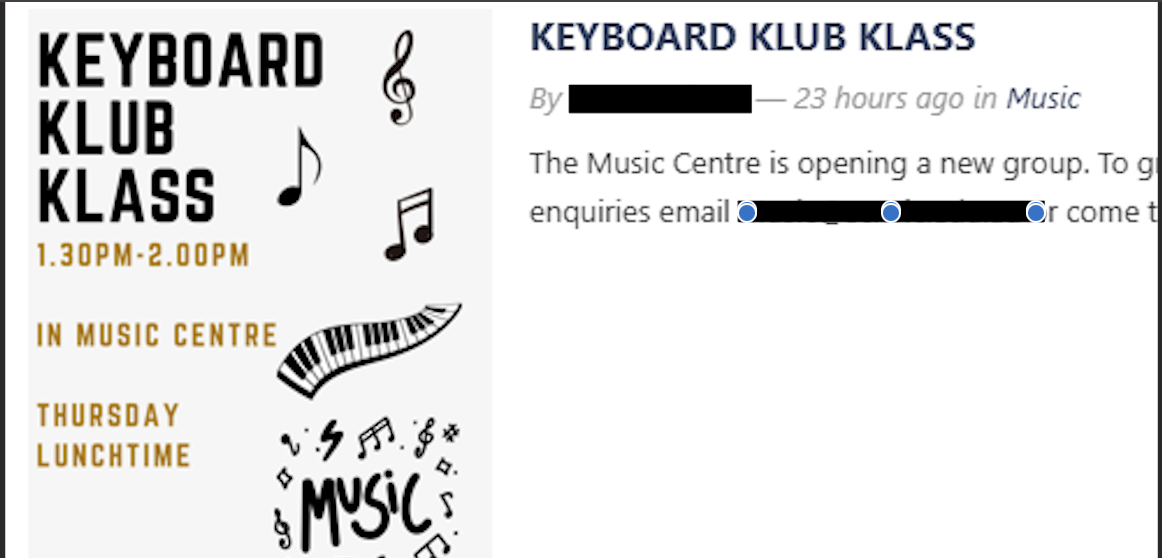
The Link Posted to the Salesian College News Feed

Instead this was interpreted as a link to the Ku-Klux Klan and taken down a week later. Many pupils at the school questioned how such a large mistake was overlooked by the staff members organising the club.

== The School ==
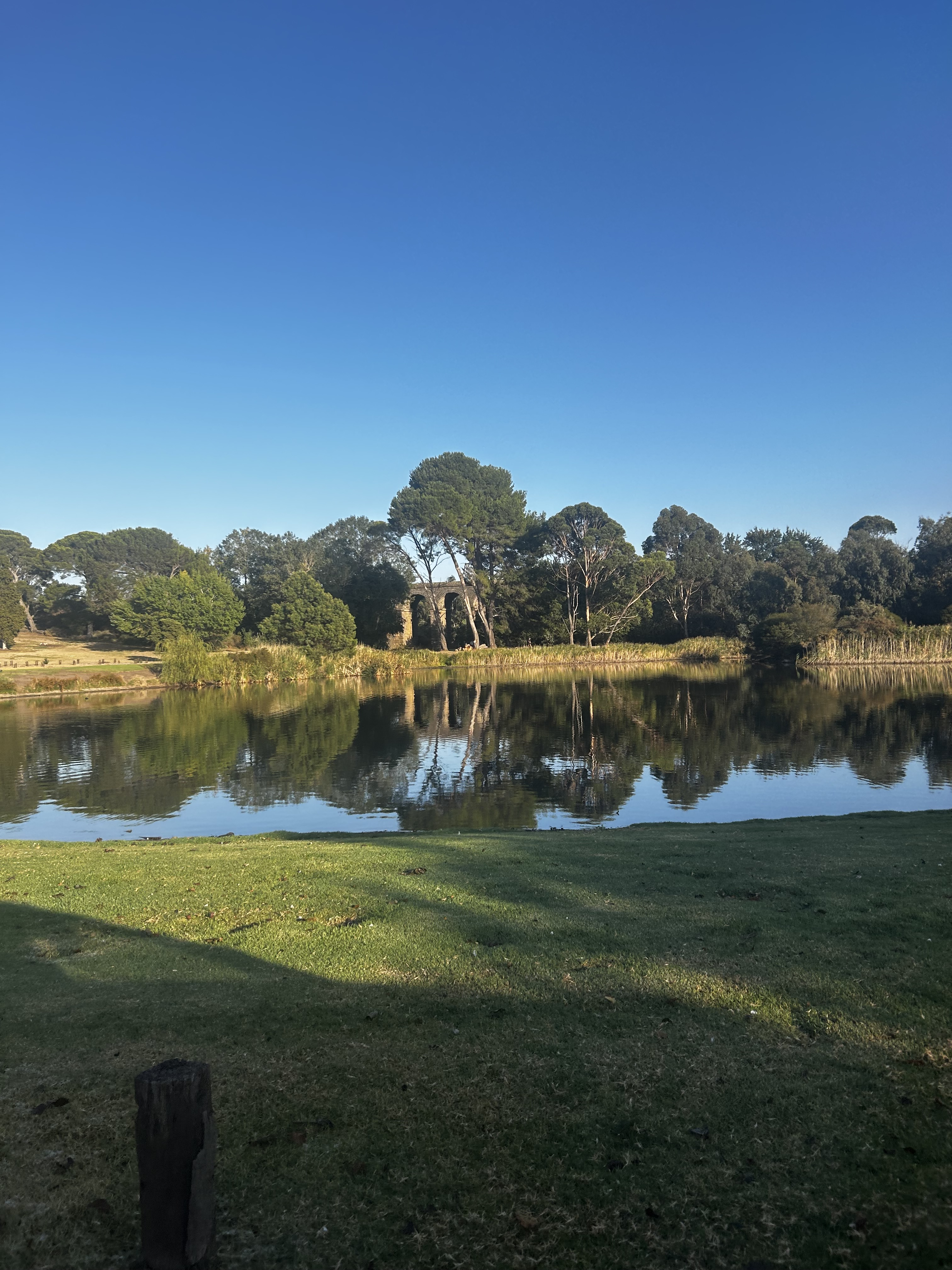
Lake on school grounds

Salesian College Sunbury is an Australian High School that follows the VCE & VCE VM system. The school has a broad curriculum ranging from agriculture to visual communications, with its own sporting facilities, including a 25m swimming pool, 4 outdoor Basketball courts, 2 large indoor stadiums, a cross-country equestrian course, 1 full-size football ground and a Multipurpose grass oval. The college also has a lake which connects to the nearby Jacksons Creek.

The grounds are split into sections (colloquially known as "blocks") and are named after important figures to the college, such as the Oswald Learning Centre "O Block" (The science facilities) and the Ciantar Learning Commons "CLC" (The library").

A new campus for students undergoing 11-12 VCE is under construction and is expected to have finished by 2028.

Salesian College Sunbury is heavily influenced by the Salesian order of the same name, most notably with the system of "Oratory" which is a time set aside during the day for conversations around faith, schooling and students. also through the naming of the cohorts, "Savio" for years 7-10 (Dominic Savio) and "Bosco" from years 11-12 (John Bosco) Previously ("Mazzarello" for Year 9 (Maria Domenica Mazzarello), which used to be in a separate area that is now set aside for the Year 12s).

== Alumni ==
The Past Pupils Association is the alumni association of Rupertswood for all students since its foundation in 1927. This association networks with the other Salesian Past Pupils Associations in Australia and around the world. The group aims to foster and cultivate a continuing association with the college and to build on the networks and friendships developed over the years.

=== Notable alumni ===
- Nathan Buckley (AFL footballer and coach)
- Johnny Famechon (world featherweight boxing champion)
- Harrison Jones (AFL footballer)
- James Kelly (AFL footballer)
- Ronald Ryan (last person to be executed in Australia)
- David Schwarz (AFL footballer and media personality)
- Tom Sheridan (AFL footballer)
- Peter Walsh
- Matthew Egan (AFL footballer)
- Maddi Gay (AFLW player)
- Matthew Howes (Para-Triathlete PTS2)
