= Harrison Jones (Australian footballer) =

Australian football league player

Personal information
- Born: 25 February 2001 (age 25)
- Original team: Calder Cannons (NAB League)
- Draft: No. 30, 2019 national draft
- Debut: 20 March 2021, Essendon vs. Hawthorn, at Marvel Stadium
- Height: 196 cm (6 ft 5 in)
- Weight: 88 kg (194 lb)
- Position: Forward

Club information
- Current club: Essendon
- Number: 23

Playing career^{1}
Years	Club	Games (Goals)
2020–	Essendon	64 (57)
- ^{1} Playing statistics correct to the end of round 22, 2026.

Career highlights
- 2021 AFL Rising Star: nominee

Harrison Jones (born 25 February 2001) is an Australian rules footballer who plays for Essendon in the Australian Football League (AFL).

== Early football ==
Jones played junior football with the Gisborne Rookies in the Riddell District Football League. He attended Salesian College (Rupertswood) before moving to Penleigh and Essendon Grammar School, where he played football for the school. His school football coach likened him to St Kilda great Nick Riewoldt due to his 'enormous work-rate'. Jones played for the Calder Cannons in the NAB League, where he played predominantly as a ruck. Over his two seasons with the Cannons, he played 15 games, averaged 9.3 hitouts and 12.8 disposals. He also played for Vic Metro in the 2019 AFL Under 18 Championships, where he kicked 4 goals from 4 games, and averaged 9.3 disposals.

== AFL career ==
Jones was drafted by Essendon with pick 30 in the 2019 AFL draft, their first selection of the draft.

Having not made a senior appearance in his first season at the club, Jones debuted in round 1 of the 2021 AFL season On debut, Jones collected 13 disposals and kicked 3 behinds. In round 14 against Hawthorn, Jones was nominated for Rising Star kicking 2 goals and 1 behind. The following week, Jones was nominated for Goal of the year against Melbourne. Having played the first 16 matches of the season, Jones suffered a foot injury which ruled him out for the rest of the season.

Jones' injury troubles continued over the next couple of seasons, with an ankle injury sidelining him for the first half of the 2022 season, making his return in round 11. In 2023, Jones only managed 5 matches before he was ruled out for the rest of the season with a stress fracture in his back, while also being sent for an ankle reconstruction with the goal of having his ankle issues fixed by the next season. Jones signed a one-year extension to remain at Essendon for 2024.

In 2024, Jones was finally able to put together a full season of football, playing 21 of a possible 23 games and deployed in a new role on the wing. Jones hit a trigger on his contract for an extra season, having surpassed 10 games played in the season, to remain with the club for 2025.

Jones played the first seven games for the Bombers of the 2025 season, but dislocated his ankle in a round 8 match against North Melbourne, which ended his season despite initial reports that he could return to playing within a month.

== Statistics ==
Updated to the end of round 22, 2026.

Legend
G	Goals	K	Kicks	D	Disposals	T	Tackles
B	Behinds	H	Handballs	M	Marks

Season	Team	No.	Games	Totals							Averages (per game)							Votes
Season	Team	No.	Games	G	B	K	H	D	M	T	G	B	K	H	D	M	T	Votes
2020 (Note: The 2020 season was played with 17 home-and-away matches per team (down from 22) and 16-minute quarters with time on (down from 20-minute quarters with time on) due to the impact of the COVID-19 pandemic.)	Essendon	23	0	—	—	—	—	—	—	—	—	—	—	—	—	—	—	0
2021	Essendon	23	16	20	6	77	40	117	57	21	1.3	0.4	4.8	2.5	7.3	3.6	1.3	0
2022	Essendon	23	10	13	5	44	32	76	28	14	1.3	0.5	4.4	3.2	7.6	2.8	1.4	0
2023	Essendon	23	5	2	4	29	16	45	21	4	0.4	0.8	5.8	3.2	9.0	4.2	0.8	0
2024	Essendon	23	21	18	11	145	83	228	103	32	0.9	0.5	6.9	4.0	10.9	4.9	1.5	0
2025	Essendon	23	7	2	2	45	26	71	26	19	0.3	0.3	6.4	3.7	10.1	3.7	2.7	0
2026	Essendon	23	5	2	0	27	12	39	16	14	0.4	0.0	5.4	2.4	7.8	3.2	2.8	0
Career			64	57	28	367	209	576	251	104	0.9	0.4	5.7	3.3	9.0	3.9	1.6	0
