= Sir Rupert Clarke, 2nd Baronet =

Sir Rupert Clarke 2nd Baronet
- Born: Rupert Turner Havelock Clarke; 16 May 1865; Rupertswood, Sunbury, Victoria
- Died: 25 December 1926 (aged 61); Monte Carlo, Monaco
- Occupations: pastoralist and entrepreneur
- Title: Baronet
- Spouses: Amy Mary Cumming (m. 1886; div. 1909) Elsie Florence Tucker (m. 1918)
- Parents: Sir William Clarke, 1st Baronet (father); Mary (née Walker) (mother)

Member of the Victorian Legislative Council for Southern Province
- In office June 1897 – May 1904

Sir Rupert Turner Havelock Clarke, 2nd Baronet (1865–1926) was a prominent Australian pastoralist, entrepreneur, politician and company director. He was the son of Sir William Clarke, 1st Baronet.

== Early life and education ==
Rupert Clarke was born on 16 March 1865 at Rupertswood, Sunbury, Victoria, the eldest son of William John Clarke and Mary Clarke (née Walker). His grandfather, William John Turner Clarke, was among the pioneer pastoralists of colonial Victoria. Clarke was educated at Wesley College and Hawthorn Grammar School in Melbourne, and later studied at the University of Oxford.

== Career and inheritance ==
In 1891 Clarke leased his father’s Cobram station near Deniliquin, New South Wales, and thereafter maintained a long association with pastoral interests in that State. Following his father’s death in May 1897, Clarke succeeded to the baronetcy and inherited extensive pastoral properties in Victoria, including Bolinda Vale, Red Rock and Rockbank, together comprising approximately 130,000 acres (52,600 ha). Over time he disposed of most of these holdings, retaining a reduced property at Bolinda Vale and approximately 800 acres (324 ha) near Rupertswood known as Kismet Park, on which he later built a residence after the sale of Rupertswood to his half-brother William Lionel Russell Clarke.

Clarke successfully continued his father’s stud enterprises, breeding English Leicester sheep and Derrimut Shorthorn cattle. As his Victorian holdings diminished, he expanded his pastoral interests elsewhere, particularly in Queensland, where he later owned Isis Downs in partnership with R. S. Whiting. In addition to pastoral activity, Clarke pursued a range of commercial ventures, not all of which proved successful. These included gold-mining at Coolgardie, Western Australia, in 1895; banana and peanut farming; and rubber and coconut plantations in the Territory of Papua, the latter also in partnership with Whiting. In 1914 he financed and led an expedition up the Fly River using his yacht Kismet.

Clarke also engaged in industrial and commercial enterprises while resident at Sunbury, including the establishment of a rabbit-canning factory and a butter and creamery factory, and in 1912 he undertook an unsuccessful experiment in peanut cultivation. In the early 1900s, with John Gunn and Clyde Meynell, he leased the Theatre Royal, Melbourne and the Criterion Theatre, Sydney. In July 1911 Clarke and Meynell amalgamated their interests with J. C. Williamson Ltd, following which Clarke became a director of the company.

In addition to his Australian properties, Clarke owned several residences interstate and overseas. In New South Wales he lived at Caerleon and Bayview on the Hawkesbury River. In England he leased Brockwood Park in Hampshire, and at Old Place, Sussex. He also owned the Villa des Abeilles in Monte Carlo, where he died in 1926.

=== Political career ===
Clarke entered the Victorian Legislative Council in 1897 as a representative for Southern Province and immediate successor of his father who had held the same seat in the Chamber. He held the seat until 1904, while continuing his involvement in banking, pastoralism and international business interests.

=== Military service ===
In 1897 Clarke was commissioned as lieutenant commanding the Rupertswood Nordenfeldt Battery. During the First World War he served as a lieutenant in the Royal Army Service Corps. He was invalided from Salonika in 1916 and discharged from service in 1917.

=== Sporting and yachting activities ===
Clarke was keenly interested in sport, particularly yachting and horse racing. He owned the yachts Kismet and La Carrabine, and in 1904 sailed La Carrabine through the South Seas with his brother Ernest Clarke. He was associated with several leading Australian yacht clubs.

== Personal life ==
Clarke first married Aimee Mary Cumming, daughter of Victorian politician The Hon. Thomas Forrest Cumming, on 22 December 1886. The marriage produced two daughters before ending in divorce in 1909:

- Mary Phyllis Clarke, who married Reginald Power in 1909.
- Aimee Gwendolyn Clarke.

In November 1918 he married Elsie Florence Tucker, daughter of J. Partridge Tucker of Devon and Sydney, by whom he had three children:

- Rupert William John Clarke (1919–2005), who succeeded to the baronetcy in 1926.
- Ernest Edward Dowling Clarke (1920–1940).
- Elizabeth Elsie Faith Clarke (born 1924).

=== Death and estate ===
Sir Rupert Clarke died at Monte Carlo, Monaco, on 25 December 1926. He was survived by his widow and five children; his seven-year-old son Rupert succeeded to the Baronetcy. His widow remarried in 1928 to Terence Taylor, Earl of Bective (who succeeded his father as Marquess of Headfort in 1943) by whom she had two more children, including Michael Taylour, 6th Marquess of Headfort.

Probate of Sir Rupert's will was granted in Victoria in 1927. His Victorian estate was valued at approximlately £300,000, including real property valued at £81,005 and personal property valued at £203,882, upon which £23,000 in death duties were levied. In Victoria the largest real property asset was his Bolinda Vale property near Lancefield, which then comprised 4,622 acres (1,870 ha). The personal estate in Victoria consisted principally of bonds (approximately £128,000), shares (approximately £20,000), and debts owing to the estate (approximately £25,000).

His personal estate in New South Wales was valued at £91,114, and his personal estate in Queensland at £101,007.

Under the terms of his will and codicil, Sir Rupert made structured provision for his widow and children, with trust funds set aside as follows:

- £100,000 for each surviving son, to be held in trust with income applied for maintenance and education, and to vest absolutely on attaining the age of 21.
- £50,000 to be set aside as a separate fund for the son who, upon attaining the age of 21, succeeded to the baronetcy.
- £60,000 for each surviving daughter, to be held in trust, with income payable for her sole and separate use.

In addition, Clarke provided his widow, Elsie, Lady Clarke with a life annuity of £5,000, as well a life interest in the income of hisresiduary estate, together with specified property interests in New South Wales.

After the death of his widow, the income from the residuary estate was to be held in trust for his children as tenants in common, with the daughters’ shares to remain settled so that income was paid to them for their separate use.

== Select bibliography ==
- J. Smith (ed), Cyclopedia of Victoria, vols 1, 3 (Melb, 1903, 1905);
- H. H. Peck, Memoirs of a Stockman (Melb, 1942);
- L. G. Houston, Ministers of Water Supply in Victoria (Melb, 1965);
- R. Gibson, My Years in the Communist Party (Melb, 1966);
- P. M. Power, From These Descended (Kilmore, Vic, 1977);
- Tocsin, 28 Jan 1904; Weekly Times (Melbourne), 21 Aug 1909; Punch (Melbourne), 16 Apr 1914; Age (Melbourne), 14 Feb 1955;
- W. Howat, annals of the Clarke family (State Library of Victoria). More on the resources

Baronetage of the United Kingdom
Preceded by William Clarke	Clarke Baronet of Rupertswood; 1897–1926	Succeeded by Rupert Clarke
