= Sir Rupert Clarke, 4th Baronet =

Sir Rupert Clarke Bt
- Born: Rupert Grant Alexander Clarke; 1947 or 1948 (age 78–79)

Sir Rupert Grant Alexander Clarke is the 4th Baronet Clarke of Rupertswood, having succeeded his father, Sir Rupert Clarke, 3rd Baronet.

In 1978 he married Susannah Law-Smith, daughter of Sir Robert Law-Smith; at the time of the engagement, Susannah was employed as the Private Secretary to the-then Wife of the Prime Minister of Australia Tamie Fraser. The couple have three children.

The Clarke of Rupertswood baronetcy, granted 1882, is one of only two extant of Australian territorial designation.

Sir Rupert Clarke lives in Melbourne, Australia, and succeeded his father when he died in 2005. As of 2019 he and his wife continued to own the Clarke family's historic estate Bolinda Vale in the Shire of Macedon Ranges. His son Rupert is the heir-apparent to the Baronetcy.

Baronetage of the United Kingdom
Preceded by Rupert Clarke	Clarke Baronet of Rupertswood; 2005-present	Incumbent
