= Sir William Clarke, 1st Baronet =

Australian politician (1831–1897)

Sir William Clarke Bt
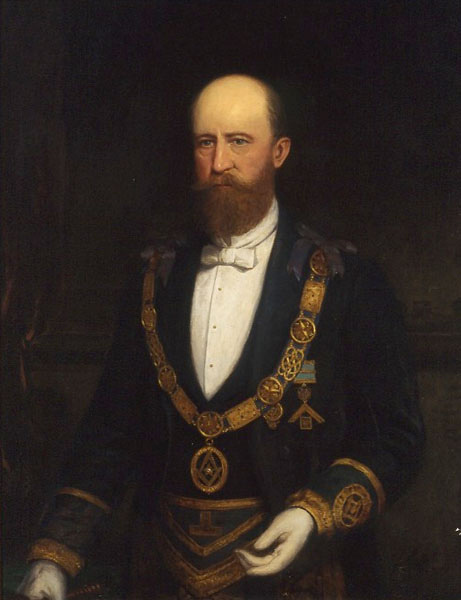

Member of the Victorian Legislative Council for Southern Province
- In office 1 September 1878 – 1 May 1897
- Preceded by: John Bear
- Succeeded by: Sir Rupert Clarke

Personal details
- Born: 31 March 1831 near Jericho, Van Diemen's Land
- Died: 15 May 1897 (aged 66) East Melbourne, Victoria
- Resting place: Melbourne General Cemetery
- Spouses: Mary Walker (m. 1860; died 1871) Janet Marian Snodgrass (m. 1873)
- Parents: William John Turner Clarke (father); Eliza (née Dowling) (mother)

Sir William John Clarke, 1st Baronet (31 March 1831 – 15 May 1897), was an Australian businessman and philanthropist in the Colony of Victoria. He was raised to the baronetage in 1882, the first Victorian to be granted a hereditary honour.

Clarke was born in Van Diemen's Land, the son of the pastoralist William John Turner Clarke. He arrived in the Port Phillip District (the future Victoria) in 1850, where he managed many of his father's properties and acquired some of his own. Upon his father's death in 1874, he became the largest landowner in the colony. Clarke was made a baronet for his work as the head of the Melbourne International Exhibition, which brought Australia to international attention. He also served terms as president of the Australian Club, president of the Victorian Football Association, and president of the Melbourne Cricket Club, and was prominent in yachting and horse racing circles. Clarke gave generously to charitable organisations, and also made significant financial contributions to the Anglican Diocese of Melbourne and the University of Melbourne. He was a member of the Victorian Legislative Council from 1878 until 1897, although he was not particularly active in politics.

== Early life ==
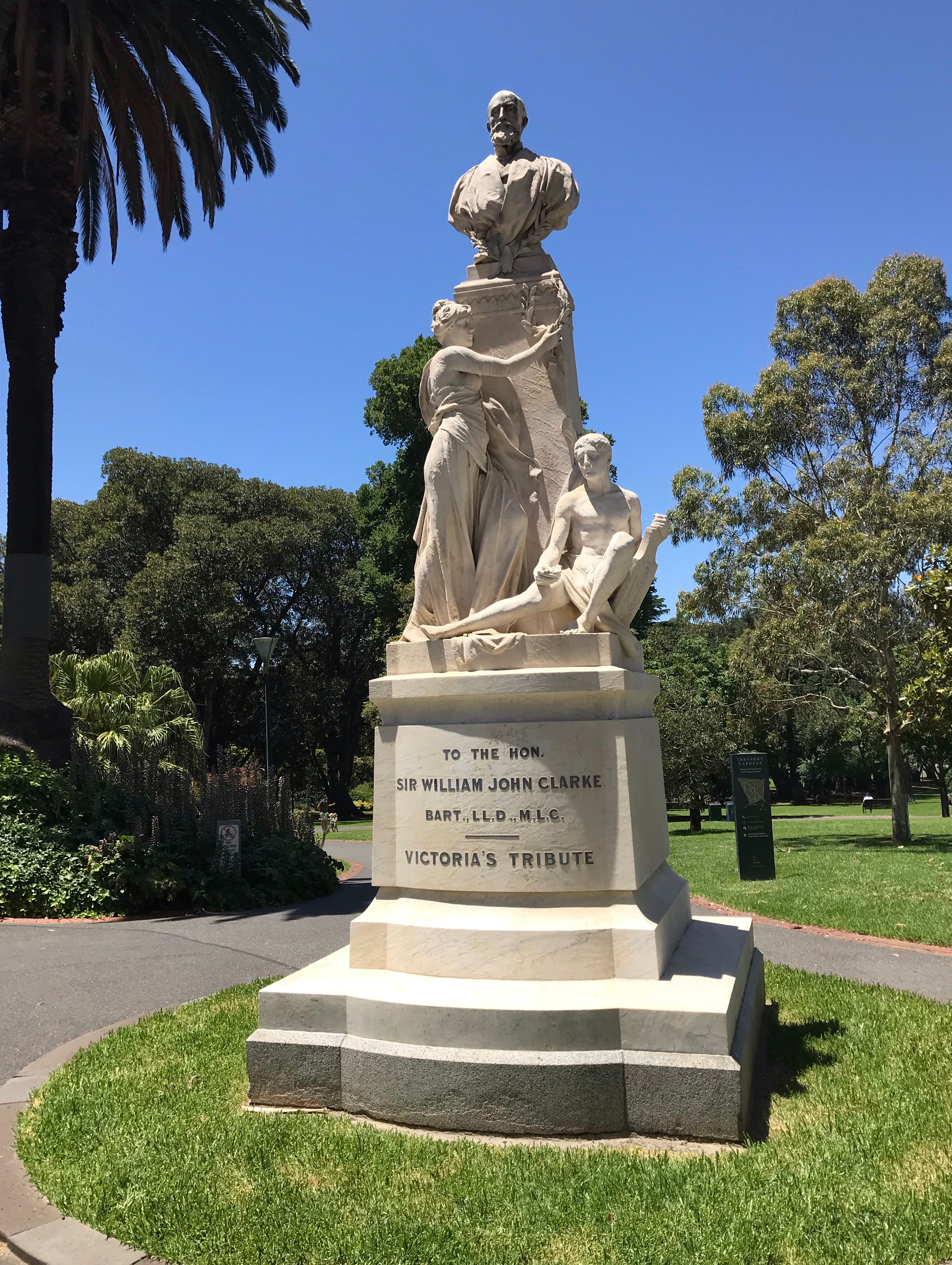
Monument to Sir William Clarke, 1st Baronet in the Treasury Gardens in East Melbourne, Victoria.

Clarke was born at Lovely Banks (one of his father's properties, near Jericho) in Van Diemen's Land (later renamed Tasmania), the eldest of three sons of William John Turner Clarke and his wife Eliza (née Dowling).

Clarke first arrived in Victoria in 1850, when he spent a couple of years in the study of sheep farming on his father's Dowling Forest station, and afterwards in the management of the Woodlands station on the Wimmera. For the next ten years he resided in Tasmania, working the Norton-Mandeville estate in conjunction with his brother, Joseph Clarke.

== Career and public life ==
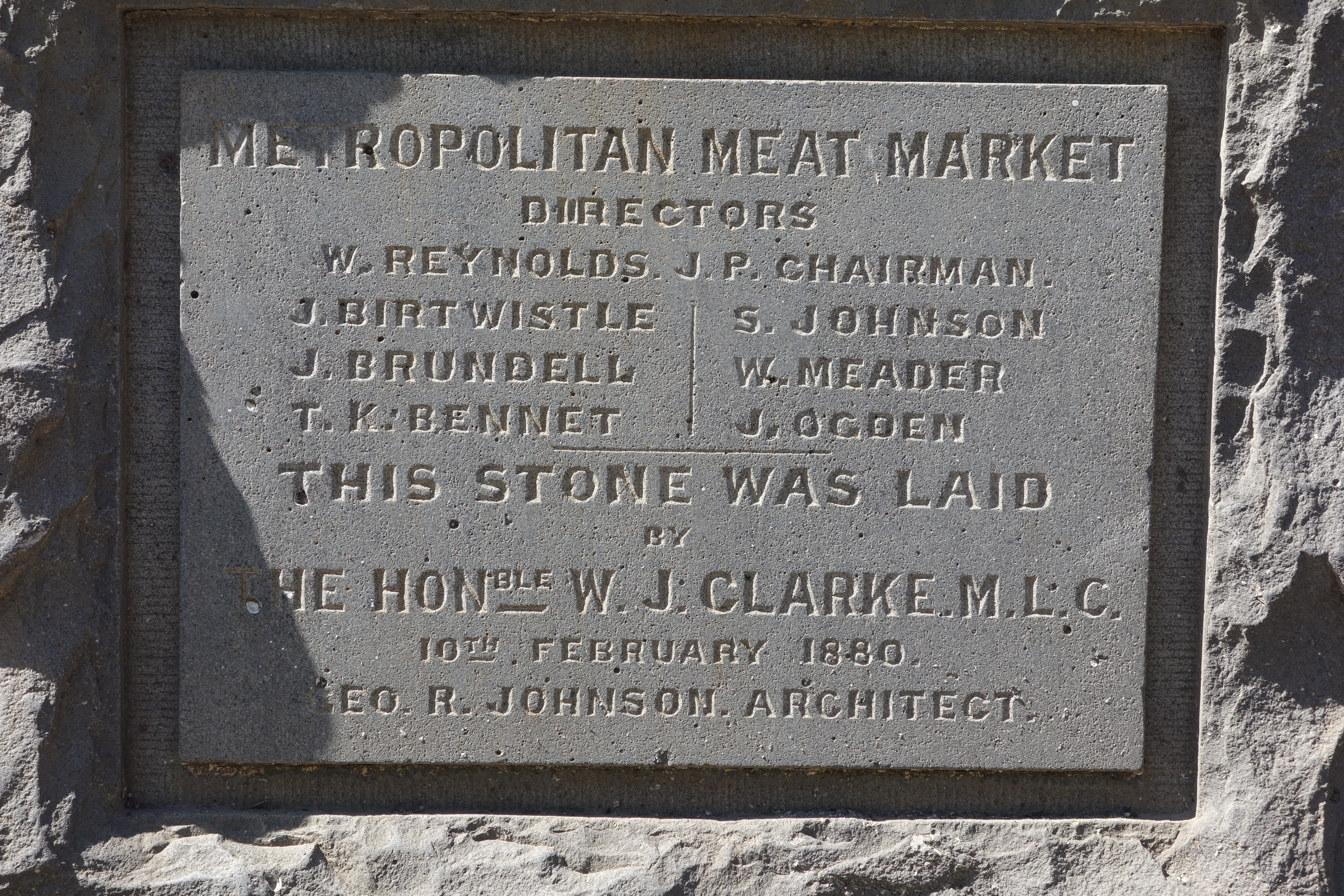
Clarke laid the foundation stone for the Metropolitan Meat Market in February 1880

In 1862 Clarke stood against George Higinbotham in the Brighton by-election for the Victorian Legislative Assembly, but was not elected. In 1878, he successfully ran for Victorian Legislative Council for the Southern Province.

In 1862 Clarke assumed the management of his father's concerns in Victoria. His father died 1874, and Clarke inherited the bulk of the family's estates on the Australian mainland; his inheritance from his father exceeded £1,500,000 and rendered the younger Clarke as the largest landowner in the Colony of Victoria.

In the same year he was appointed president of the commissioners of the Melbourne international exhibition which was opened on 1 October 1880. In 1882 he gave £3,000 to found a scholarship in the Royal College of Music. Amongst Sir William Clarke's other public donations are the gift of £2000 to the Indian Famine Relief Fund, of £10,000 towards building the Anglican Cathedral at Melbourne, and of £7,000 to Trinity College, Melbourne University.

He was the inaugural president of the Victorian Football Association, presiding from 1877 until 1882.

Clarke was a very prominent Victorian Freemason and was elected provincial grand master of the Irish Constitution in 1881 and then district grand master of both the Scottish and English Constitutions in 1884. In 1889 he became the very first Most Worshipful Grand Master of the United Grand Lodge of Victoria, an amalgamation of the three bodies that had operated at that time under their own constitutions. In 1885 he had largely financed the building of the Freemasons' Hall at 25 Collins Street.

== Personal life and family ==
Clarke was married twice; he first married Mary Walker, daughter of Victorian Politician The Hon. John Walker, on 23 November 1860. The marriage produced four children:

- Alice Blanche Clarke (4 August 1862 - 1940), who married Chessborough Falconar John Macdonald of Falcon Manor, Towcester, Northamptonshire and Wantabadgery Station, Wagga Wagga, in 1887.
  - Claude Keith MacDonald (1889 - 1915)
  - William Ian MacDonald (1890 - 1937)
  - Queenie Mary MacDonald (1896 - 1968) who married Capt. Archibald Thomas Ayres Ritchie OBE in 1917, who later became Chief Game Warden of Kenya.
- Rupert Turner Havelock Clarke (16 March 1865 - 1926) who succeeded his father to the Clarke of Rupertswood Baronetcy in 1897. He first married Aimee Mary Cumming (daughter of Victorian Politician The Hon. Thomas Forrest Cumming); the marriage produced two daughters before the couple divorced in 1909. He remarried in November 1918 to Elise Florence Tucker, with whom he had three children.
  - Mary Phyllis Clarke (1887 - 1977) who married Reginald Power in 1909. Under the pen-name Phyllis M. Power, she became an successful children's author and historian.
  - Aimee Gwendolyn Clarke (1894 - 1979) who married firstly Col. Charles Robert Tolver Michael Gerard of Wrightington Hall, Lancashire (who was a grandson of the 1st Baron Gerard) in 1915. Following her divorce in 1930 she married Commander Humphrey Ranulph Brand, a grandson of Henry Brand, 1st Viscount Hampden in 1940.
  - Rupert William John Clarke (1919 - 2005), who succeeded as Sir Rupert Clarke, 3rd Baronet in 1926.
  - Ernest Edward Dowling Clarke (1920 - 1940)
  - Elizabeth Elsie Faith Clarke (b. 1924). In 1952 she married Willoughby Alfred Lake, son of Commodore Sir Atwell Lake, 9th Baronet (Chief of Naval Staff of the Royal New Zealand Navy from 1942 - 1945).
- Ethel Maud Clarke (12 July 1867 - 3 June 1907) who married, firstly, The Hon. George Alexander Cruikshank in 1895. Following the death of her first husband in 1904 she married Professor Horatio Scott Carslaw in February 1907.
- Ernest Edward Dowling Clarke (b. 19 May 1869 - 1941), a noted racehorse owner, closely associated with trainer James Scobie.

Mary Clarke died in 1871; Clarke remarried on 21 January 1873 to Janet Marian Snodgrass. Janet was the daughter of Victorian pastoralist and politician The Hon. Peter Snodgrass; prior to the marriage, Janet Snodgrass had been employed by Clarke as a Governess for his elder children in the late 1860s. By his second wife, Clarke fathered a further eight children:

- Clive Snodgrass Clarke (20 Oct 1873 - 3 Feb 1894) a Lieutenant in the 8th Hussars Regiment of the British Army, who died in London aged 20.
- Mary Janet Clarke (25 December 1874 - 1960), who married Major The Hon. Robert Lindsay, third son of James Lindsay, 26th Earl of Crawford, in 1903.
  - Joyce Emily Lindsay (1904 - 1998) who married Sir Martin Lindsay, 1st Baronet in 1932, and later divorced in 1967.
  - Robert William Ludovic Lindsay OBE MP (1905 - 2000), who married his first cousin Rosemary Knox in 1946, and served as the Member for Flinders in the Australian House of Representatives from 1954 to 1966.
  - Rosemary Jean Aline Lindsay (1908 - 1968) who married William Charles Ayshford Sanford of Nynehead Court, Somerset in 1928, and later divorced in 1951. Sanford was the grandson of British politician William Ayshford Sanford, who had served as the Colonial Secretary of Western Australia from 1852 to 1855. At the time of their marriage Sanford was also the stepson of Moubray St John, 19th Baron St John of Bletso.
- William Lionel Russell Clarke (31 March 1876 - 1954), who sold his father's country estate Rupertswood in 1922. In 1908 he married Florence Douglas Mackenzie, a granddaughter of New South Wales politician John Bligh Suttor.
  - John Russell Clarke (15 December 1909 - 1963)
  - Janet Marjorie Nina Clarke (1911 - 1988), who married Henry Armstrong Hammond in 1941.
  - Michael Alastair Clarke (1915 - 2002) who married Helen Rosalind Lewis, daughter of Industrialist and Department of Munitions Director-General Essington Lewis in 1948.
- Agnes Petrea Josephine Clarke (3 September 1877 - 20 March 1879)
- Francis Grenville Clarke (14 March 1879 - 1955), who married his cousin Nina Ellis Cotton. He served in the Victorian Legislative Council for 42 years, including 20 as President of the Victorian Legislative Council. He was made a Knight Commander of the Order of the British Empire in 1926, and was thereafter known as Sir Frank Clarke.
  - John Holywell Clarke (1902 - 1918)
  - Margaret Mary Clarke (1904 - 1980) who married Barrister John Egerton Oldham in 1931; their wedding was a large high-society event, attended by several notable public figures including the-then Governor-General of Australia Sir Isaac Isaacs, Sir Richard Stawell, Gen. Sir Harry Chauvel, Major General Frederic Hughes, the groom's brother Trevor Oldham, as well as a large number of the extended Clarke family. During their marriage the couple were prominent in the Australian diplomatic service; in 1937 John Oldham joined the Department of External Affairs, and was posted to London during the late 1930s, where he worked as a personal assistant to former Prime Minister and the-then High Commissioner of Australia to the United Kingdom Stanley Bruce during the latter's tenure as the Australian representative to the British War Cabinet during the Second World War. In 1946 he accompanied Minister for External Affairs H. V. Evatt to Washington, D.C., and was appointed Counsel to the Australian Embassy in the United States; he also served as the Australian representative to the United Nations War Crimes Commission. From 1949 to 1952 Oldham served as the first High Commissioner of Australia to Pakistan. Margaret and John Oldham were divorced in 1952; she remarried in the same year to William Haldane.
  - Patricia Kathleen Clarke (1906 - 1973), who married Squadron leader Raymond Vincent O’Byrne in 1939.
  - William Antony Francis Clarke (1908 – 1953) who married Jessie Deakin Brookes, a granddaughter of three-time Australian Prime Minister Alfred Deakin
  - Colin Grenville Clarke (1914 – 1962) married Elizabeth Lennox Spiers
  - Valerie Janet Cotton Clarke (1920 – 1977), who married Sir Robert John Southey in 1946. Sir Robert later served as the President of the Liberal Party of Australia from 1970 to 1975.
- Reginald Hastings Clarke (26 October 1880 - 1914), who married Ernestine Maud Govett in 1904.
  - Joan Rosemary Clarke (1908 - 1989), who married (1) Lt. John Barclay, a grandson of Sir Thomas Barclay. After her first husband was killed in action in 1940, she married Norman Frederick Hill.
  - Reginald Clive Neville Clarke (29 Sept 1910 - 1964), who owned the "Koraleigh Park" farm in Tongala, Victoria. In 1934 he married Elizabeth Blanche Macpherson.
  - Elizabeth Ernestine Hastings Clarke (1914 - 1983), who was married in 1937 to grazier Tim Harry Collins of "Fairfield Park", Greta, Victoria.
- Lily Vera Montague Douglas Clarke (21 September 1883 - 1949), who married Major George Landale in 1911.
  - Janet Landale (1912 – 1989) who married Robert Morton.
  - Capt. William George Alexander Landale (1917 – 1980) who married Margaret Sylvia Squires in 1939, and served as Australian Ambassador to Israel from 1965 – 1970.
  - David Ian Landale (1917 – 1980) married Priscilla Raleigh in 1948.
  - Diana Jessie Landale (1916 – 1957)
- Ivy Victoria Clarke (2 October 1887 - 1962), who married Sir Robert Knox in 1914. Her husband was the son of William Knox MP, who was elected as the Member for Kooyong in Australia's first Commonwealth Parliament.
  - David William Robert Knox (1916 – 1995)
  - Keith Robert Knox (1919 – 1946)
  - Rosemary Catherine Marion Knox (1920 – 2011), who married her first-cousin Robert William Ludovic Lindsay in 1946.

== Later life ==
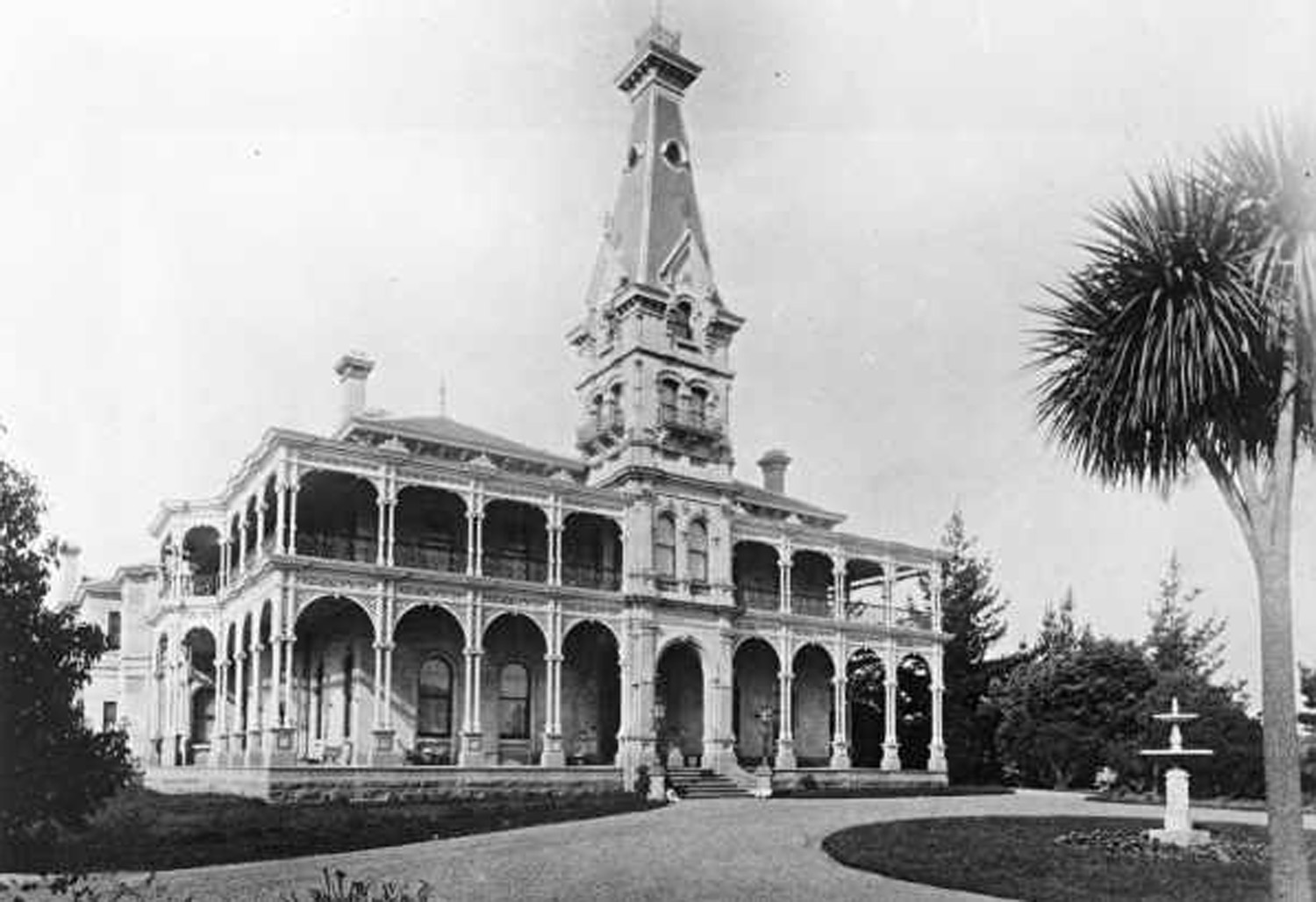
Rupertswood, c. 1890

In 1876, Clarke and his family moved into Rupertswood, a large country mansion he had built near Sunbury. His city residence was Cliveden, an equally massive mansion in East Melbourne that was completed in 1888 at a cost of £91,000.

Clarke was created a baronet in 1882, by Queen Victoria in recognition for his many donations and for his presiding over the Melbourne International Exhibition in 1880.

During the later decades of the nineteenth century, Sir William and his second wife Janet, Lady Clarke were prominent in Melbourne's high society, and were known for their lavish hospitality, hosting frequent balls, luncheons, dinners, and garden parties. Many singers and musicians got their starts by being asked to perform at these events. During the depression of the early 1890s, Lady Clarke also ran a soup kitchen out of Cliveden.

Clarke died at Melbourne on 15 May 1897. His son Rupert succeeded him as the 2nd Baronet. The baronetcy of Clarke of Rupertswood is one of only two active hereditary titles in an Australian family.

The valuation of Sir William's estate for probate included £418,896 in the Colony of Victoria, and £171,083 outside of the Colony. The total value of his estate was estimated to be well in excess of £1,000,000.

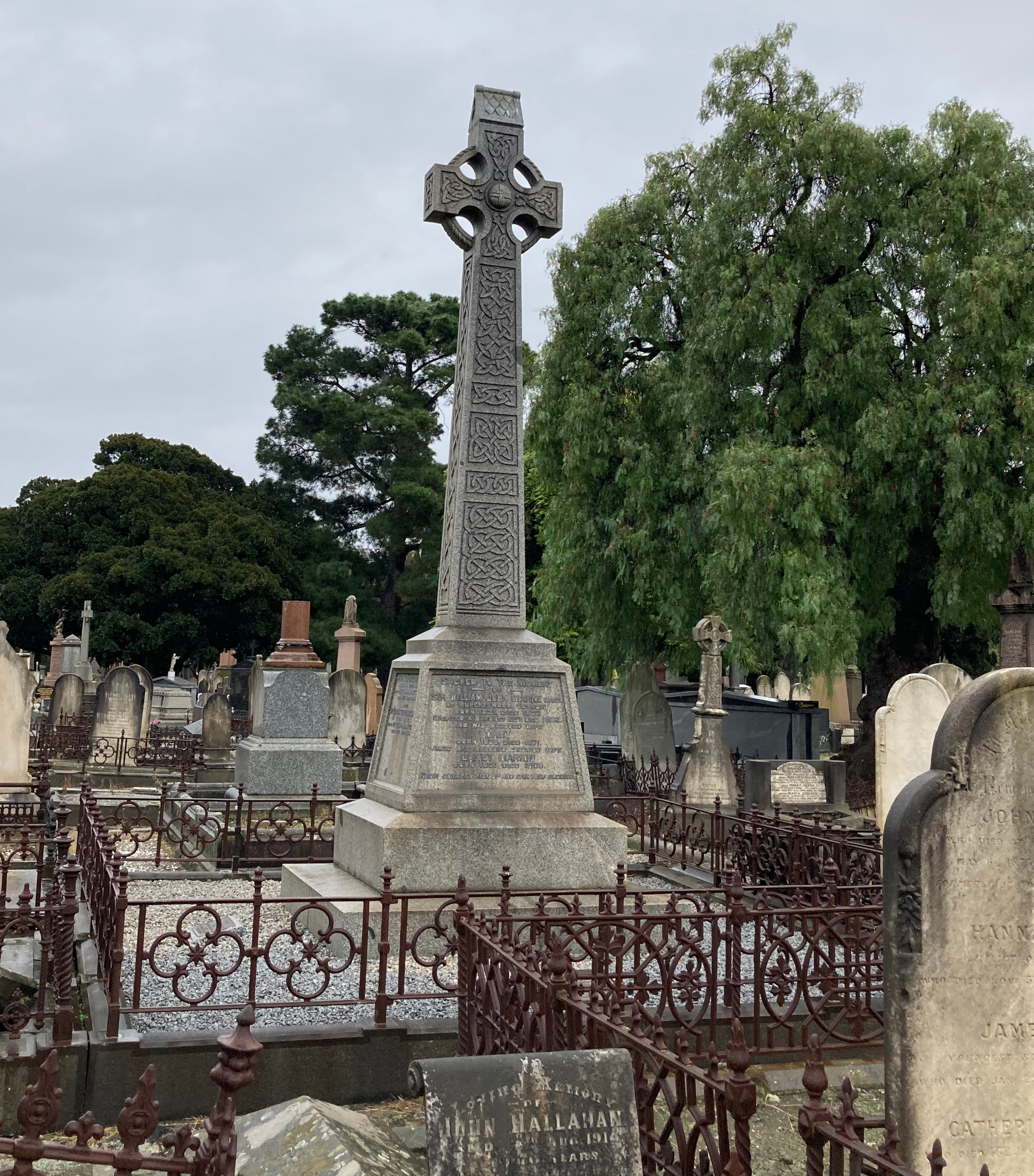
Graves of Janet and William Clarke at Melbourne General Cemetery

Clarke was a household name in Victoria.

== Footnotes ==
Victorian Legislative Council
Preceded by Frank Dobson	Member for Southern; 1878–1896; Served alongside: Frank Dobson; Donald Melville; Hamilton/Henty/James/Brunton	Succeeded by Rupert Clarke
Baronetage of the United Kingdom
New creation	Clarke Baronet of Rupertswood; 1882–1895	Succeeded by Rupert Clarke
Masonic offices
New title	Grand Master of the United Grand Lodge of Victoria; 1889–1896	Succeeded by The Lord Brassey
