= Sir Rupert Clarke, 3rd Baronet =

Sir Rupert Clarke 3rd Baronet
- Born: Rupert William John Clarke; 5 November 1919; Sydney, New South Wales, Australia
- Died: 4 February 2005 (aged 85); Melbourne, Victoria, Australia
- Occupations: soldier, businessman and pastoralist
- Title: Baronet
- Spouses: Kathleen Grant Hay (m. 1947; died 1999) Gillian de Zoete (m. 2000)
- Parents: Sir Rupert Clarke, 2nd Baronet (father); Elsie Florence (née Tucker) (mother)
- Awards: Member of the Order of Australia (AM), Member of the Order of the British Empire (Military) (MBE(M))

Sir Rupert William John Clarke, 3rd Baronet, AM, MBE (5 November 1919 – 4 February 2005) was an Australian soldier, businessman and pastoralist. He achieved success in a number of fields, including horseracing, the military and as a corporate chairman.

== Biography ==
=== Early life ===
Clarke was born in Sydney, New South Wales, the son of Sir Rupert Clarke, 2nd Bt (a prominent pastoralist and Member of Parliament) and his second wife Elsie Tucker. During the 1920s Sir Rupert purchased the Villa Les Abeilles in Monte Carlo, and the family resided at in Monaco for extended periods. During his time living in the Principality, the young Rupert attended a French-speaking primary school.

The elder Sir Rupert died in Monte Carlo on Christmas Day 1926, and the younger Rupert immediately succeeded as the Clarke Baronet of Rupertswood at the age of seven.

In 1928 his mother Elsie remarried to Terence Taylor, Earl of Bective (who would later succeed his own father as Marquess of Headfort in 1943) and the Clarke family moved to England. His mother had two children by her second husband; Lady Olivia Taylour and Michael Taylour, 6th Marquess of Headfort. Rupert became an accomplished athlete at Eton and then later at Magdalen College, Oxford. He excelled at shooting, swimming, fencing and rowing, sometimes simultaneously. Scholastically he excelled, particularly in languages. He spent a considerable amount of time travelling through Germany with friends who would soon be on the opposing side during World War II.

=== Military career ===
By 1941 he had enlisted in the British Army and was commissioned in the Irish Guards, as aide-de-camp to Lieutenant-General Sir Harold Alexander. Clarke was present at various major turning points in the war, including the withdrawal from Burma, the North African Campaign against the German Afrika Korps and the Invasion of Sicily. As ADC to Alexander, Sir Rupert met Chiang Kai-shek and Pope Pius XII.

He was created a Member of the Order of the British Empire Military division.

In 2000, Sir Rupert authored a memoir of his war adventures entitled With Alex at War – From the Irrawaddy to the Po 1941-1945.

=== Marriage and children ===
After the war, Clarke returned to Australia; in 1947 married Kathleen Grant Hay, the daughter of successful Melbourne brewery owner, Peter Grant Hay. The couple had three children:

- Rupert Grant Alexander Clarke (b. 12 December 1947), who married Susannah Law-Smith, daughter of Sir Robert Law-Smith in 1978. At the time of the engagement, Susannah was employed as Private Secretary to the-then Wife of the Prime Minister of Australia Tamie Fraser. Rupert succeeded his father as the Clarke Baronet of Rupertswood in 2005.
  - Samantha Kathleen Clarke (b. 1980)
  - Rupert Robert William Clarke (b. 1981)
  - Joanna Georgina Clarke (b. 1983)
- Vanessa Margaret Clarke (b. 1952), who married Roden Cutler, son of New South Wales Governor Lt. Gen. Sir Arthur Roden Cutler V.C. in 1975, with whom she has four children.
- Peter Robert Justin John Clarke (b. 1955), who married Andrea Pitt in 1983.
  - Alexandra Kathleen Grant (b. 1984)
  - William Peter Norman Grant Clarke (b. 1986)

Lady Clarke died in 1999, and in the following year Sir Rupert remarried to Gillian de Zoete.

==== Inheritance and residences ====
Following his father's death in 1926, Rupert inherited the 4,622-acre Bolinda Vale estate in the Shire of Romsey, north of Melbourne, as well as £150,000 in Trust funds which would vest into his ownership on his 21st birthday. He also inherited a reversionary right to his father's residuary estate jointly with his brother, sister and two half-sisters, subject to his mother's life interest in this property under the terms of his father's will.

In 1962 his wife Kathleen, Lady Clarke purchased the historic Pateley House located at 56 Avoca Street, South Yarra for £25,000, which had been constructed in 1859. Sir Rupert and Lady Clarke renamed the property Richmond House in acknowledgement of Lady Clarke's father's business interests, and Richmond House served as the family's town residence in Melbourne for the remainder of the 20th century. Following Lady Clarke's death in 1999, Richmond House was sold to Melbourne stockbroker Michael Kirwan for $3.7 million.

=== Business interests ===
Following his appointment as a Director (his first of many) of the Richmond Brewery in 1950, Sir Rupert returned to England seeking introductions to inspect breweries.

In early 1951 Sir Rupert and Lady Clarke visited King Ranch in Texas. Sir Rupert, asked the late Robert J. Kleberg, who had founded the Santa Gertrudis breed of cattle in the US, if he would consider a partnership venture to ship cattle to Australia for stud purposes. This approach eventually led to the formation of King Ranch Australia with Peter Baillieu, Sam Hordern and Sir Rupert being the Australian partners recommended to Bob Kleberg by the famous WS Robinson.

Prior to the importation of King Ranch cattle Sir Rupert having sold his property "Kismet" at Sunbury, he purchased Marlborough Station in central Queensland and subsequently Carse O' Gowrie Station near Ravenswood, Queensland.

Forty-five King Ranch Santa Gertrudis bulls arrived in Brisbane on 15 June 1952 but the remaining 27 bulls and 201 heifers were held up for more than nine weeks by a seaman's strike. They arrived in Melbourne around 27 August and after a month of quarantine at Coode Island, came to the family property "Bolinda Vale" to spend a further six weeks before being railed to Queensland. Five bulls, personally selected by Kleberg, were kept by Sir Rupert to establish his own stud herd.

By 1974 the emphasis on pastoral development waned and towards the end of the 1980s the balance of the King Ranch properties in Australia was sold to Bankers Trust for around $100 million.

Clarke became involved in horse racing, and was on the Victoria Amateur Turf Club (now the Melbourne Racing Club) for 40 years, nearly half that time as chairman.

He was also chairman of Cadbury Schweppes Australia, and P&O Australia, deputy chairman of the Distillers Group and the third generation of Clarke baronets to sit on the board of the National Australia Bank. He was also the Honorary Consul of Monaco.

Sir Rupert was engaged in a variety of charitable works, and was made a Member of the Order of Australia in recognition of this.

=== Later life and death ===
Sir Rupert died in 2005 at the age of 85, leaving three children and his second wife, Gillian, Lady Clarke. His eldest son Rupert succeeded to the baronetcy as Fourth Clarke Baronet of Rupertswood. The baronetcy (originally awarded to Sir William Clarke by Queen Victoria in 1882), is only one of two now extant of Australian territorial designation, and the only such baronetcy held by an Australian-born citizen.

Baronetage of the United Kingdom
Preceded by Rupert Clarke	Clarke Baronet of Rupertswood; 1926–2005	Succeeded by Sir Rupert Clarke
