= Rupertswood =

Historic mansion in Victoria, Australia

Coordinates: 37.572772°S 144.738538°E

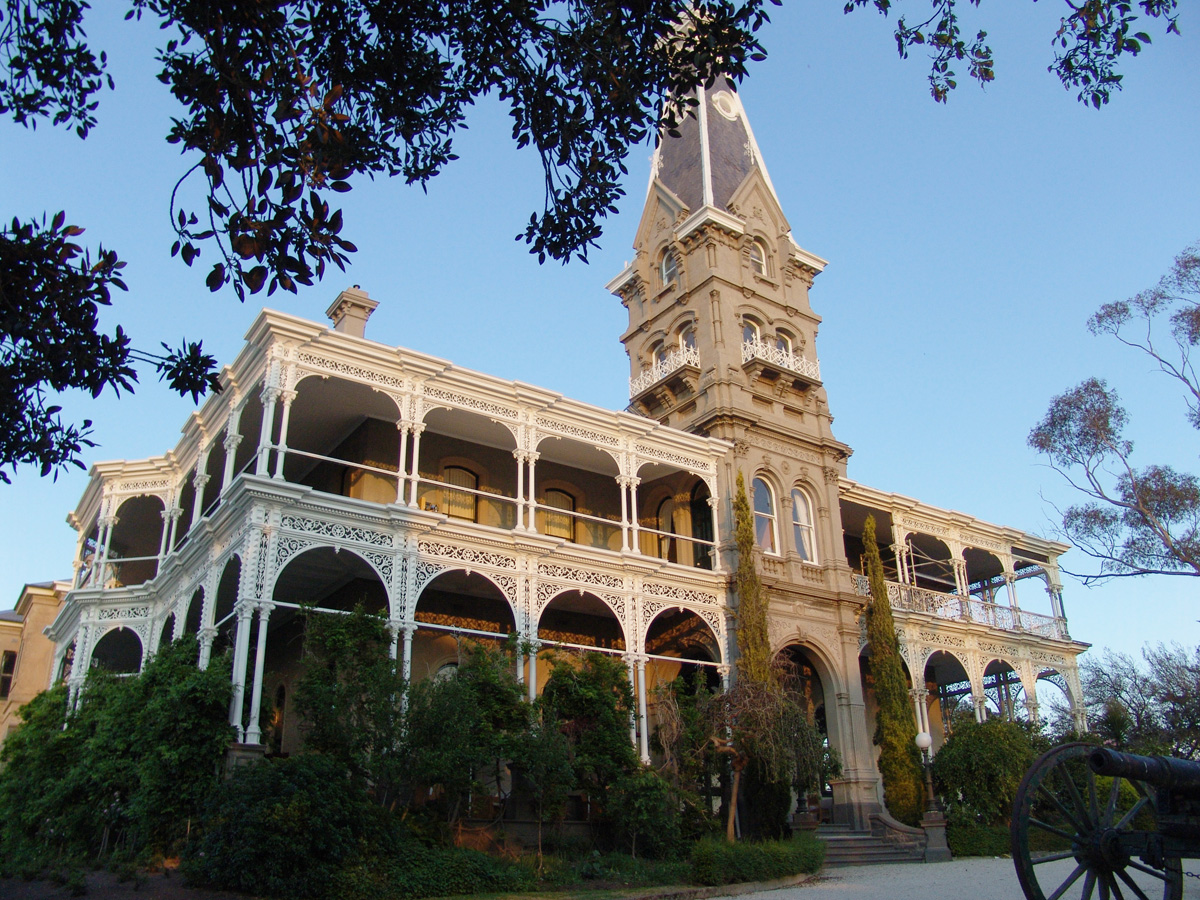
The front of Rupertswood mansion.

Rupertswood is a mansion and country estate located in Sunbury, 50 km north-northwest of Melbourne in Victoria, Australia. It is known for being the birthplace of the Ashes urn, which was humorously presented to English cricket captain Ivo Bligh to mark his team's victory in an 1882–83 Test match series between Australia and England. Rupertswood is one of the largest houses constructed in Victoria and, although now subdivided, has significant farm land. The estate also had its own private railway station (until closure in 2004), and artillery battery. It is listed on the Victorian Heritage Register.

== History ==
=== Private residence ===
The foundation stone for Rupertswood was laid on 29 August 1874 with around 1,000 people in attendance. The house was the country seat completed in 1876 for Sir William Clarke, a land owner and pastoralist who was one of Australia's wealthiest men and the first Australian-born baronet. It was designed by local architect George L. Browne in the Free Classical style. From 1874 to 1876, Sir William Clarke employed landscape designer William Sangster to design and create the surrounding gardens.

The estate was sold in 1922 to Hugh Victor McKay, a wealthy industrialist and inventor of the Sunshine Harvester.

Following McKay's death, his executors attempted to sell the estate. An auction was held in November 1926, although the house was withdrawn after bids reached £93,000. The house was later purchased by pastoralist William Naughton.

=== Boarding school ===
In 1927, the estate was bought by the Salesian Society, which used the mansion and surrounding property as a male boarding school. The school later became co-educational, relocated into separate premises nearby, and is known as Salesian College, Rupertswood.

In March 2006, the Commonwealth Games Queen's Baton Relay travelled to the area, where a re-enactment of the handing over of the Ashes to the English took place in front of a small local crowd.

The mansion was restored with the help of interior designer and Victorian architecture specialist Jacqui Robertson and converted into a hotel that was often used for weddings and other formal events until its closure in 2014. The contents were auctioned on-site in July 2014 by Glenelg Auction Centre. The building is now used as administration offices for Salesian College.

== See also ==
- Rupertswood railway station
- Salesian College (Rupertswood)
- The Ashes
