= United States support for Israel in the Gaza war =

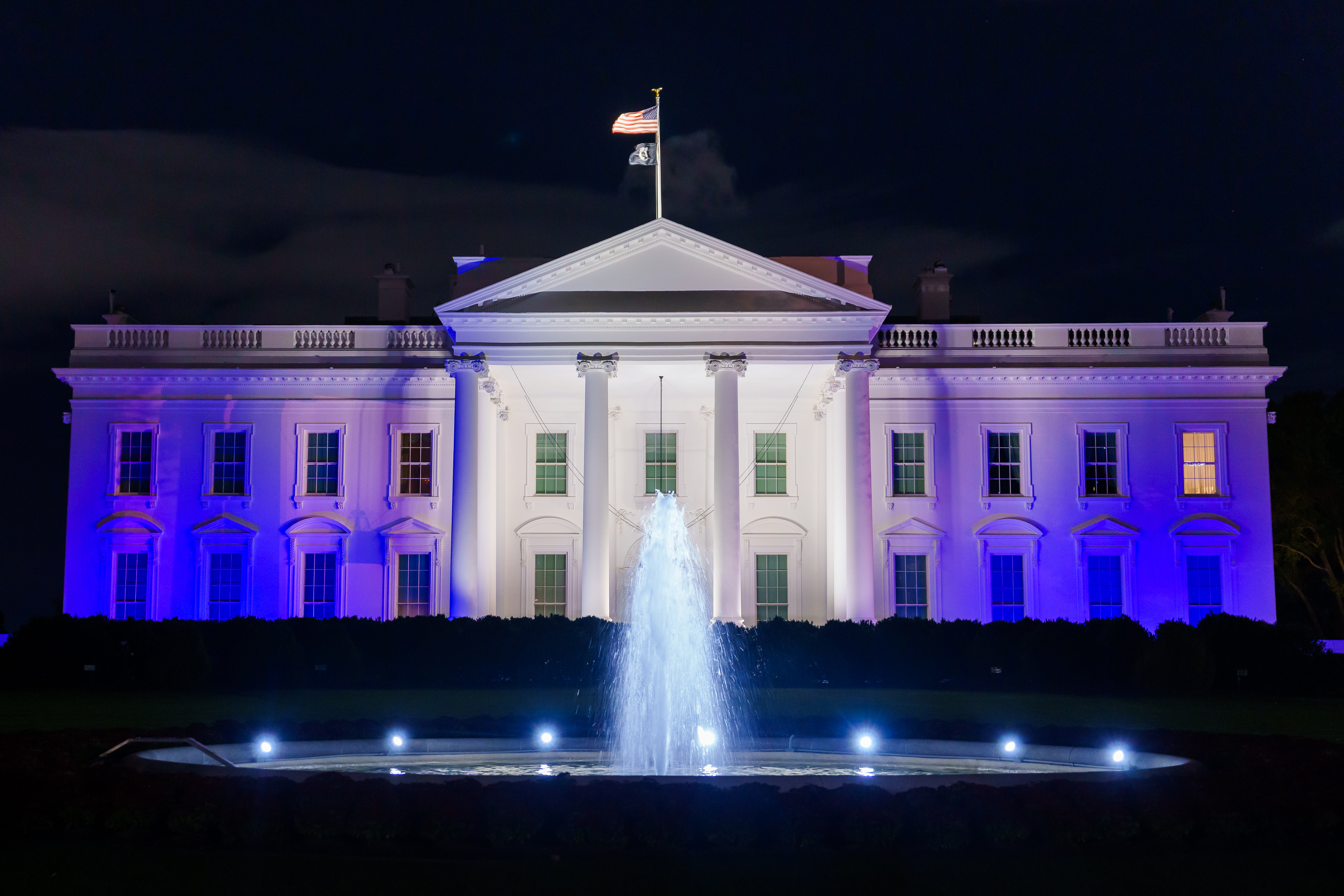
The White House illuminated in the colors of the Israeli flag on 9 October 2023

The United States has provided extensive military, diplomatic, and financial support to Israel during the ongoing Gaza war. This has included rapid deployment of warships and military aircraft, billions of dollars in military aid and expedited weapons shipments — including guided missiles, artillery shells, and advanced defense systems.

After an initial period of broader Western support for Israel's offensive, Israel and the United States have become increasingly isolated amid growing worldwide calls for a ceasefire, with the US vetoing six United Nations Security Council resolutions calling for a ceasefire. International rights groups have condemned the U.S. for providing support to Israel which they say risks complicity in Israeli war crimes and violations of the Leahy Law and Foreign Assistance Act.

As the war continued, tensions between the Israeli government and the Biden administration began to grow. Some in the US government became more publicly critical of Israel as Palestinian civilian casualties rose and opposition grew. Over a dozen U.S. officials resigned, and there were large-scale demonstrations on university campuses and outside defense contractors. In February 2024, the Biden administration issued a national security directive requiring written assurances from Israel that it was using US-supplied weapons in line with international law. In March 2024, the US began calling for an immediate and sustained ceasefire linked to the release of hostages, and Israel criticized the US for allowing a ceasefire resolution to pass at the UN Security Council. The US also voiced its opposition to much of Israel's post-war plan for Gaza. Despite this, however, American weapons transfers to Israel continued.

== Background ==
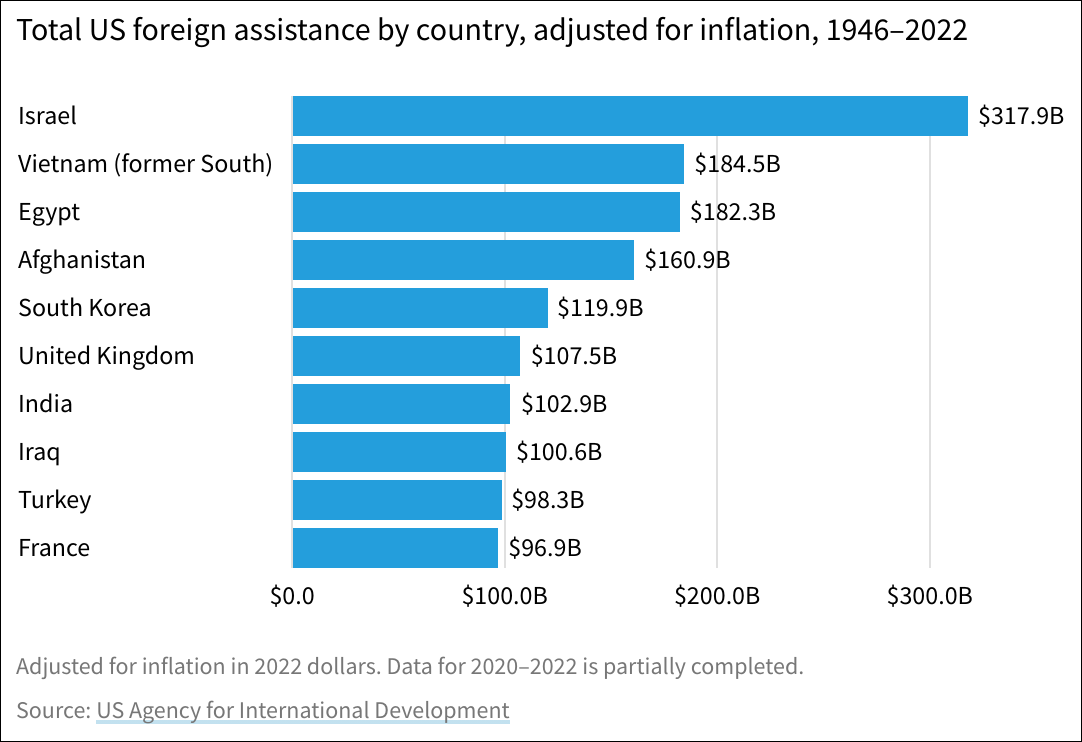
Graph showing recipients of U.S. foreign aid, 1946–2022

After Hamas-led Palestinian armed groups attacked Israel on 7 October, resulting in the death of 1,195 Israelis, 828 of which were civilians, Israel began a military campaign against Gaza. Since the start of the Israeli operation, more than 73,000 Palestinians in Gaza have been killed, of the whom at least half of those identified were women and children, with at least 80% of the total dead being civilians. Almost 7,400 Palestinians are missing and presumed trapped under rubble. Israel placed Gaza under a complete blockade, including the prevention of fuel and water from entering the Gaza Strip. The United States described Hamas-led attack as "unprovoked," and started sending warships and warplanes into the region, prepared to give Israel whatever it needs. Civil rights groups such as the Center for Constitutional Rights meanwhile called on the government to address the underlying issues that have led to the recent violence, such as Israel's illegal possession of the Palestinian lands and its blockade of Gaza as well as "the apartheid regime throughout historic Palestine".

Following Israel's victory over surrounding Arab forces in the 1967 Six-Day War and its subsequent occupation of the West Bank, East Jerusalem, and Gaza, military assistance to the country surged significantly. The Iron Dome, which became operational in 2011, was created with the help of the United States, which is responsible for providing components for the system, including allocating more than $1.5 billion for missile defense for Israel in 2022. As part of a record $38 billion agreement over ten years negotiated under former US President Barack Obama in 2016, US military aid to Israel exceeded $3.8 billion in 2023. Of this $3.8 billion, half a billion was for Israel's missile defense. Washington has announced that it will replenish Israel's ammunition used in the war.

== Military support ==
=== Weapons transfers ===
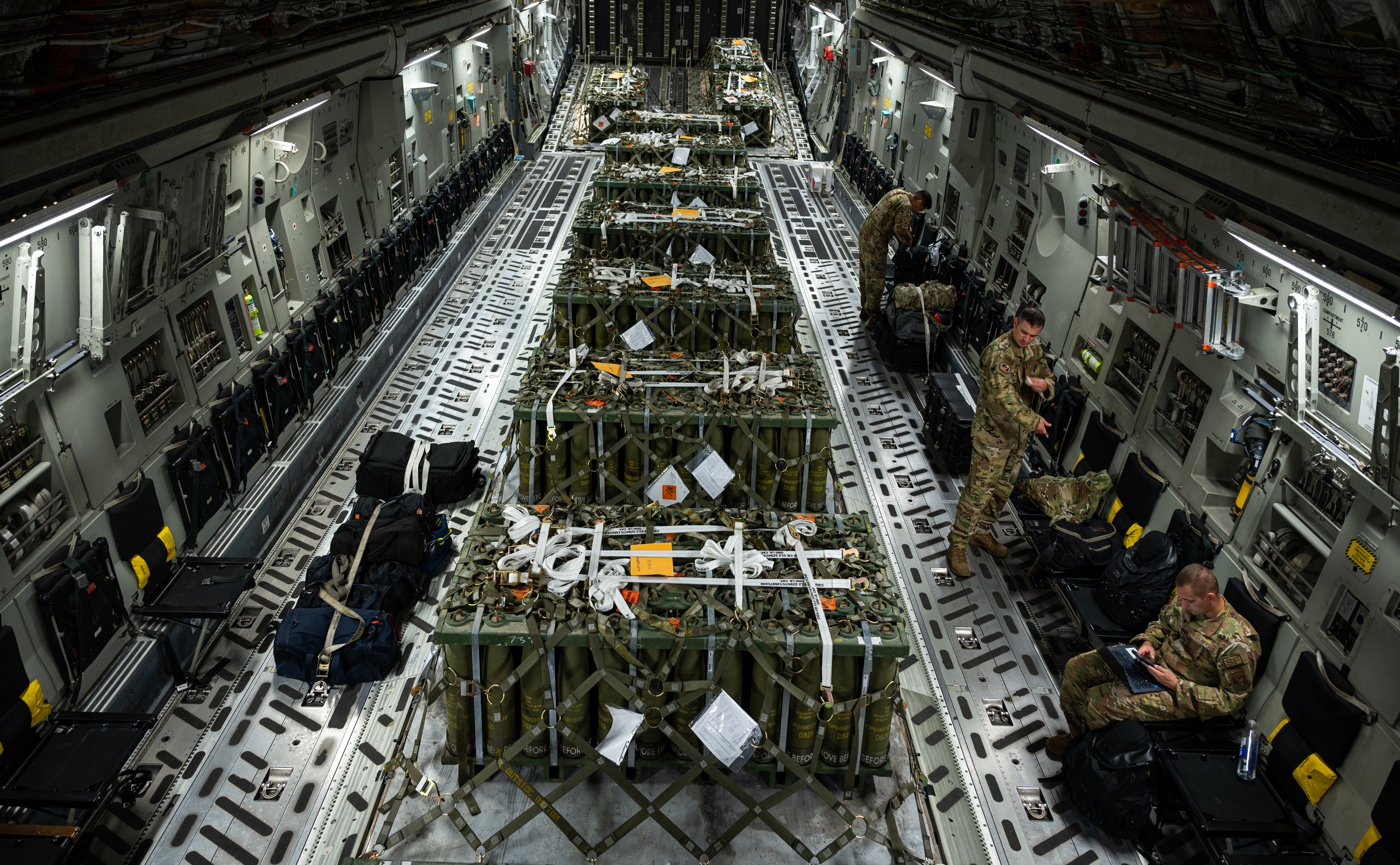
USAF airmen prepare for departure in a C-17 Globemaster III carrying ammunition to Israel, 15 October 2023, at Ramstein Air Base, Germany.

The Biden administration caused controversy after bypassing Congress on multiple occasions to authorize arms sales to the Israeli military. Unlike the United States' military support for Ukraine, details of weapons sent to Israel have been vague. Leaked details have shown that the U.S. has sent laser-guided missiles, 155mm shells, new army vehicles, among others, at Israel's request. According to the Costs of War Project at Brown University, the United States spent $21.7 billion on military aid to Israel from October 2023 to September 2025.

In December 2023, the WSJ report stated that US arms shipments to Israel since the start of the war included 15,000 bombs and 57,000 155mm artillery shells. The United States also delivered 100 BLU-109 bunker buster bombs, 5,000 unguided Mk82 bombs, more than 5,400 Mk84 bombs, about 1,000 small diameter GBU-39 bombs, and approximately 3,000 JDAM guidance kits.

An investigation by The Guardian found the U.S. government was using special mechanisms to protect Israel from domestic human rights laws to continue sending weapons. Following a trip to Washington D.C. in June 2024, Israeli defense minister Yoav Gallant addressed Israeli complaints about slowed arms transfers, stating, "Obstacles were removed and bottlenecks were addressed". A report by ProPublica found the U.S. State Department had ignored reports about potential human rights violations by the Israeli army to continue weapons transfers to Israel. Current and former State Department officials stated there were more than 500 reports of Israel using U.S. weapons to cause "unnecessary harm to civilians" in the Gaza Strip, but that no action had yet been taken on any of the reports.

Unnamed officials stated in March 2024 that the U.S. had signed off on an additional 1,800 MK84 2,000-pound bombs and 500 MK82 500-pound bombs. In May 2024, Israel used two U.S.-made GBU-39 missiles during the Tel al-Sultan massacre. GBU-39 bombs were also identified in other attacks on dense civilian areas, including the Al-Sardi school attack and the Al-Tabaeen school attack. In June 2024, two U.S. officials stated the United States had transferred ten thousand 2,000-pound bombs and thousands of Hellfire missiles to Israel since 7 October. In late-June 2024, an Israeli official stated the Biden administration would soon transfer a delayed shipment of 500 pound bombs to Israel. In mid-July 2024, a U.S. official confirmed that the United States was resuming its transfers of 500 pound bombs to Israel.

In August 2024, the Biden administration approved a $20 billion arms sale to Israel, including F-15 fighter jets and tank and mortar shells. The United States approved a $165 million sale of military tank trailers, including replacement parts, tool kits, and logistics support.

=== Naval and air support ===
The United States has provided naval and aerial support to Israel on multiple occasions since October 2023. In April 2024, U.S. fighter jets, along with the U.K., France, and Jordan, shot down Iranian drones and missiles directed at Israel. In June 2024, the United States sent the USS Wasp and its marines aboard to serve as a deterrent to Hezbollah in its conflict with Israel. In August 2024, the United States deployed the USS Abraham Lincoln Carrier Strike Group, equipped with stealth F-35C Lightning II combat jets, and the ballistic missile submarine USS Georgia, to Israel.

In October 2024, the United States deployed the Terminal High-Altitude Area Defense, along with 100 U.S. troops to Israel. That same month, an investigation using available open source data found that U.S. aircraft were responsible for 33 percent of reconnaissance flights, providing Israel with intelligence on ground movements in the Gaza Strip. In November 2024, the United States ordered ballistic missile defense destroyers, a fighter squadron, tanker aircraft, and Air Force B-52 long-range strike bombers to "make clear" to Iran that the U.S. would "take every measure necessary to defend" its interests in the region.

In response to the United States's involvement, U.S. Representatives Rashida Tlaib and Cori Bush wrote a letter to the Biden Administration asking for an explanation as to the country's participation in Israel's military engagements and suggesting such collaboration was unauthorized and unconstitutional.

== Financial support ==
The United States has provided $9 billion in loan guarantees to Israel. Israel has also issued $5 billion of debt in the U.S. during the war with state and local governments making up a large portion of the purchases. Karen Wells et al. point to the billions in financial support as evidence of US complicity in Israel's "genocidal war". Research in 2024 showed that Israel's military relies heavily on fuel imports from the US for its operations in Gaza. Francesca Albanese, the United Nations Special Rapporteur on the occupied Palestinian territories, said the United States' provision of fuel to Israel after the ICJ's provisional ruling was "a breach of the Genocide Convention".

As of April 2024, state and local governments in the U.S. had purchased $1.7 billion in Israel Bonds since 7 October 2023. States which have purchased Israel bonds during the war include Florida, Illinois, Indiana, New York, and Texas. Palm Beach County in Florida has purchased almost $700 million in Israel bonds during the war, leading residents to file a lawsuit against the county comptroller Joseph Abruzzo for allegedly violating his fiduciary duty. On 6 February 2025, President Donald Trump issued Executive Order 14203 imposing sanctions on the International Criminal Court (ICC) due to its arrest warrants for Israeli leaders. In June 2025, the United States imposed financial sanctions on four ICC judges including two who were part of the investigation of Benjamin Netanyahu and Yoav Gallant. The US also imposed financial sanctions on Francesca Albanese after she issued a report on corporate involvement in the Gaza war. On 20 August 2025, the US sanctioned ICC judge Nicolas Guillou for authorizing the arrest warrants for Netanyahu and Gallant. The US also sanctioned ICC prosecutors Nazhat Shameem Khan and Mame Mandiaye Niang for continuing to investigate Israel.

== Protests ==
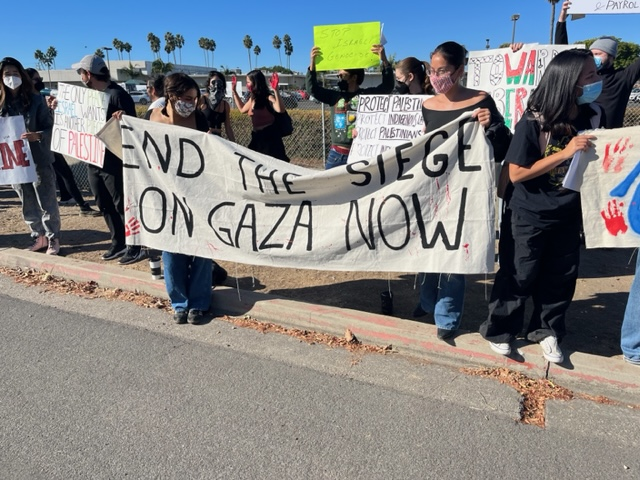
Demonstration outside Raytheon's office in Goleta, California to protest the military contractor's supply of weapons to Israel, 9 November 2023

Josh Paul, a senior State Department official specializing in arms transfers, resigned after stating the U.S. government continues to sell weapons to Israel despite its record of human rights abuses.

"Direct action" tactics were adopted against arms companies in the United States that supplied arms to Israel, including Lockheed Martin, General Dynamics, Textron, Boeing, L3Harris, Raytheon Technologies and Northrop Grumman.

War protesters on university campuses are calling for universities to withdraw any funding from arms manufacturers and companies linked to the Israeli military, including Cisco, Caterpillar and General Electric.

A group of seven Democrat U.S. senators stated that the Biden administration was in violation of the Foreign Assistance Act, which stipulates that weapons cannot be transferred to governments blocking humanitarian assistance. Senator Chris Van Hollen called on Biden to cease weapons transfers, stating, "We need the president and the Biden administration to push harder and to use all the levers of US policy to ensure people don't die of starvation".

In June 2024, the NAACP called on the Biden administration to stop sending weapons to Israel.

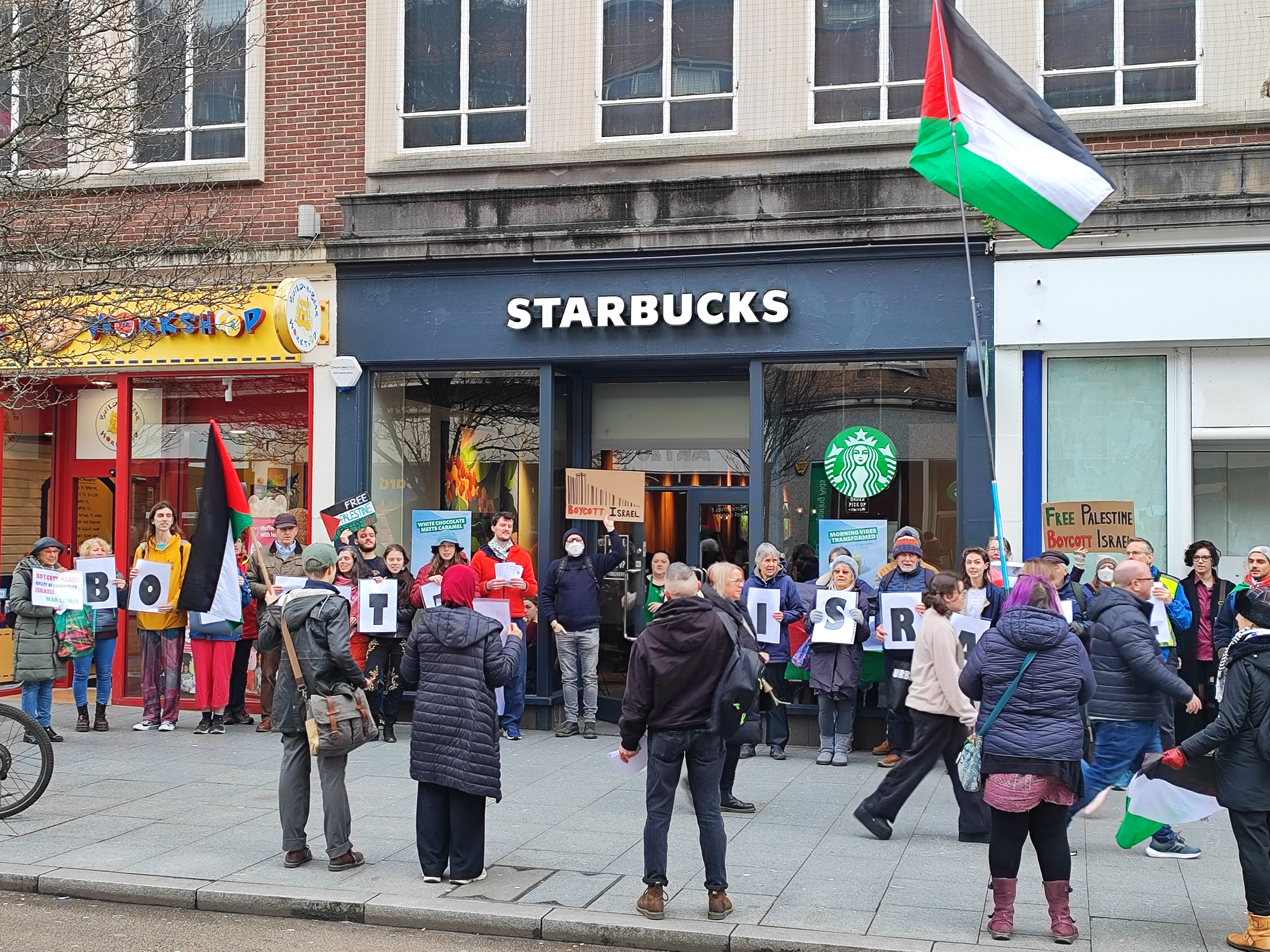
Pro-Palestinian protest against the American chain Starbucks in Exeter, England, 10 February 2024

In July 2024, a group of U.S. doctors and nurses returning from Gaza stated they had witnessed widespread war crimes committed by the Israeli army and called on the United States to implement an arms embargo. In October 2024, a majority of all American doctors who had volunteered in Gaza in the prior year signed a letter to the Biden administration calling for an arms embargo. Later the same month, the editorial board of the Financial Times called for an U.S. arms embargo on Israel, stating, "Biden has the tools to rein in Netanyahu. He must halt the offensive arms sales to Israel that enable its relentless bombing of Gaza and Lebanon."

In May 2025, a pro-Palestinian protest was held in Denver, Colorado against Congressman Jason Crow for repeatedly accepting campaign donations from Palantir Technologies, which provides intelligence and surveillance services to the Israel Defense Forces (IDF) in the Gaza war.

== Human rights issues ==
Joe Biden delivering remarks on Hamas's attack on Israel, October 2023

The United Nations General Assembly on 27 October 2023 voted a non-binding resolution calling for a humanitarian ceasefire to enable relief to enter Gaza; the United States stood with Israel in rejecting the proposal. The previous week, Washington had vetoed a resolution similar to this one at the more powerful UN Security Council. Email correspondence between the Pentagon and White House in October 2023, however, showed U.S. officials were concerned about the risk of Israeli war crimes.

Democratic congressman Andre Carson of Indiana wrote to The Guardian, accusing Israel of "war crimes" and citing the Israeli Defence Forces' (IDF) alleged use of white phosphorus and this week's deadly bombing of the Jabalia refugee camp. "I am very concerned that our taxpayer dollars may be used for violations of human rights," Carson wrote. The Biden administration declared earlier that week that it was not imposing any restrictions on Israel's use of the US-supplied weapons. According to Pentagon spokesman Sabrina Singh, "That is really up to the Israel Defense Force to use in how they are going to conduct their operations... But we're not putting any constraints on that."

Like Carson, Democratic representative Alexandria Ocasio-Cortez, particularly mentioned the alleged use of white phosphorus, as asserted by Amnesty International and Human Rights Watch (HRW), as a violation that should bar Israel from getting aid from the US. "Deployment of white phosphorus near populated civilian areas is a war crime," she said.

Following reports that the U.S. State Department had not found Israel's assurances of following international law credible, William Hartung wrote that State Department staffers' "desires to align U.S. actions with U.S.and international law have been firmly rebuffed by the Biden administration's leadership team". In August 2024, the Quincy Institute published a list of twenty instances in which Israel used U.S. weapons to commit likely war crimes. Bryan Finucane warned the U.S. could be complicit if Israel used its weapons to commit war crimes.

Reuters reported that the Biden administration obtained intelligence from Israeli military lawyers that indicated Israel may have committed war crimes. According to the report, the administration continued providing weapons to Israel under the justification that the US had not gathered this information itself. The US also reportedly obtained evidence of Israel's use of Palestinians as human shields.

=== Alleged US complicity in Gaza genocide ===
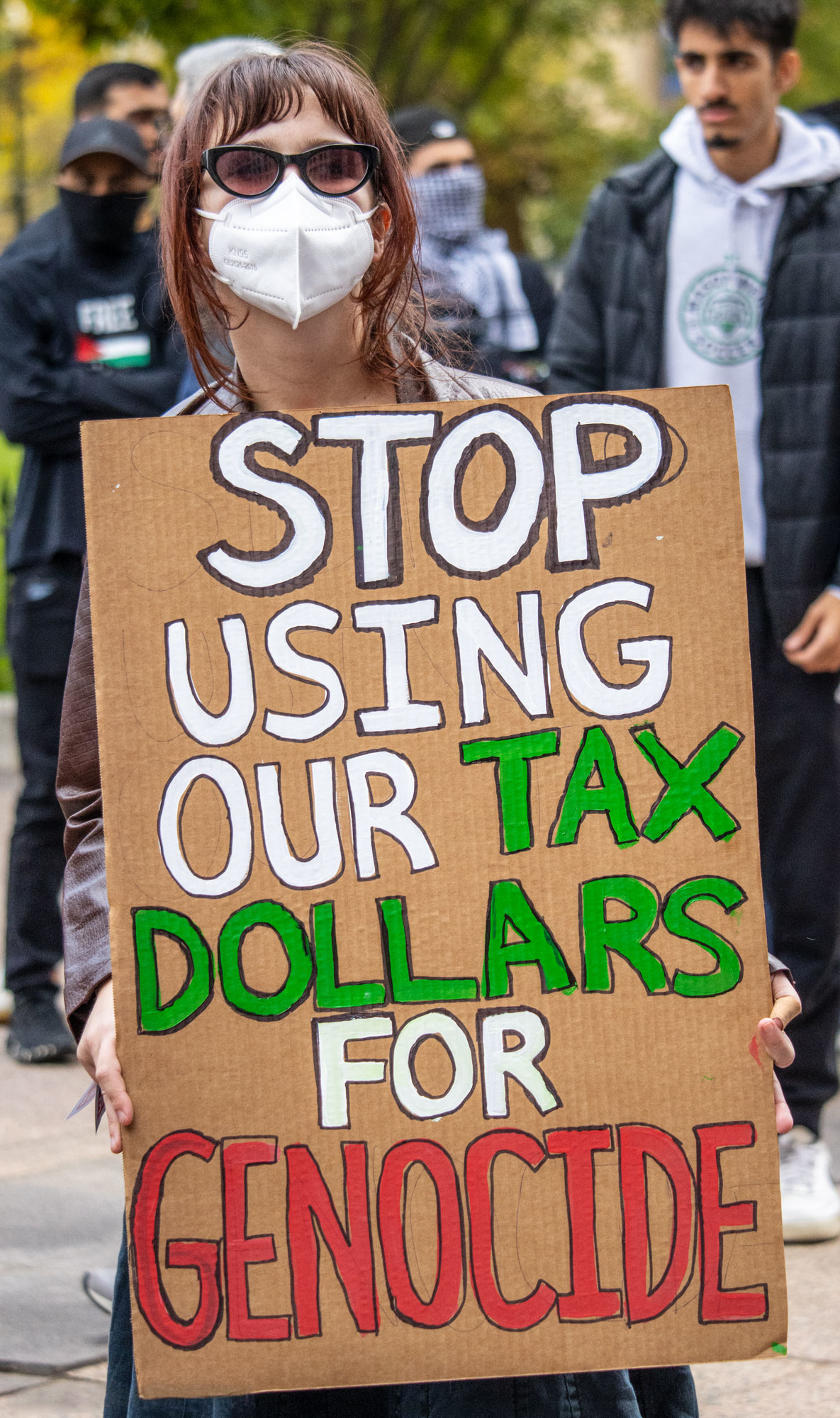
Pro-Palestinian protester in Columbus, Ohio, October 2023

Some scholars believe that America is complicit in an alleged genocide committed by Israel against the Palestinians.

In late October 2023, The Intercept reported that lawyers of the Center for Constitutional Rights (CCR) warned the Biden administration that they could be held liable "for their failure to prevent Israel's unfolding genocide, as well as for their complicity, by encouraging it and materially supporting it". In November, the Center sued Biden for allegedly failing in his duty under national and international laws to prevent Israel from committing genocide in Gaza. The CCR argued that "the United States has the means available to have a deterrent effect on Israeli officials now pursuing genocidal acts against the Palestinian people in Gaza." In a declaration in the lawsuit, genocide scholar William Schabas said that in his view there was a "serious risk of genocide" and that the US was "in breach of its obligation" under the 1948 Genocide Convention and international law.

In November 2023, president Joe Biden was nicknamed "Genocide Joe" by critics of his support for Israel. Rashida Tlaib, a Democratic representative of Michigan, accused Biden of supporting "the genocide of the Palestinian people". US Representative Marjorie Taylor Greene (R) sponsored a resolution to censure Tlaib. National Security Council spokesman John Kirby, described by Israeli media outlet Ynet as "an exceptionally accomplished Israeli advocate," said "Israel's trying to defend itself against a genocidal terrorist threat. So if we're going to start using that word, fine, let's use it appropriately."

Following the veto of another resolution in the UN Council on 8 December 2023, international human rights organizations issued the following statement: "By continuing to provide Israel with weapons [and] diplomatic cover as it commits atrocities, including collectively punishing the Palestinian civilian population in Gaza, the US risks complicity in war crimes."

During an August 2024 meeting with humanitarian aid organizations, U.S. diplomat Lise Grande reportedly responded to concerns about Israel's international humanitarian law violations by responding that Israel was too close an ally for the United States to cease sending weapons. In September 2024, a ProPublica investigation found that USAID and other agencies found that Israel had deliberately blocked humanitarian aid, but that the U.S. Secretary of State Antony Blinken had rejected their findings.

Human Rights Watch (HRW) announced in August 2025 that US military personnel who assist Israeli forces in committing war crimes may be prosecuted for their actions.

=== Legal obligations ===
==== Foreign Assistance Act ====
On 14 December 2023, Independent Senator Bernie Sanders introduced a privileged resolution invoking Section 502(b) of the Foreign Assistance Act, calling on the State Department to investigate Israeli crimes against humanity in its conduct of the war in Gaza. Sanders said that "This resolution is not prescriptive — it does not alter aid to Israel in any way. It simply requests that the State Department report on how our aid is being used." The resolution would freeze US military aid to Israel unless the State Department issues a report within 30 days. The proposal was defeated, 72 to 11, with only Sanders and Democratic Senators Jeff Merkley, Chris Van Hollen, Martin Heinrich, Laphonza Butler, Ed Markey, Ben Ray Luján, Mazie Hirono, Peter Welch and Elizabeth Warren and Republican Rand Paul voting for it. Senator Brian Schatz (D-HI) voiced support for the resolution. Among the senators who voted against the resolution were Chuck Schumer (D-NY), Mitch McConnell (R-KY), Dick Durbin (D-IL), Bill Cassidy (R-LA), Chris Murphy (D-CT), Rick Scott (R-FL), Tom Carper (D-DE), Mike Braun (R-IN), Bob Casey (D-PA), Mike Lee (R-UT), and Independent Angus King of Maine and Kyrsten Sinema of Arizona. Senator Chris Coons (D-DE) opposed the resolution. Senator Ben Cardin (D-MD), the chairman of the Foreign Relations Committee, said that the resolution "would be a gift to Hamas, a gift to Iran".

==== Leahy Laws ====
Some Democrats have argued that the $14.3 billion package the White House has promised Israel violates the Leahy Act because most of the victims of Israel's attacks on Gaza are civilians. The act forbids the US State and Defence departments from providing security support to foreign governments that are suspected of violating human rights. The act's proponents refer to the increasing number of Gaza residents losing their lives as a result of military operations, the forced relocation of over a million people, and the escalating humanitarian situation following Israeli authorities' cuts to the region's supplies of fuel, food, water, and electricity. A group of top U.S. House Democrats urged the president to enforce the Leahy Laws.

Usamah Andrabi, Justice Democrats' director of communications – said "I think the Leahy Act should absolutely be looked into right now, when we are seeing gross violations of human rights," he said. "[The Israelis] are targeting refugee camps, hospitals, mosques all under the guise of self-defense or that one or other member of Hamas is hiding there. It doesn't matter whether Hamas is there or not, because you are targeting civilians. No amount of tax dollars should be justified for that."

Charles O. Blaha, the former director of the State Department's Office of Security and Human Rights, wrote in Just Security, stating that the U.S. secretary of state's decision not to issue sanctions on the IDF's Netzah Yehuda Battalion appeared to be "directly contrary to the Leahy law". Stacy Gilbert, a former-State Department official, stated, "It is widely known and documented in the humanitarian community and the US government that Israel has been blocking humanitarian assistance since the start of the Gaza conflict".

Raed Jarrar, director of advocacy at DAWN, an American nonprofit that fights for democracy and human rights in the Arab world, supported Palestinians who sued the State Department over US aid to the Israeli military, and called on the government to follow the Leahy law.

== Backlash to US support ==
=== Double standards accusations ===
The Islamic world and much of the Global South accused the United States and its allies of a double standard in condemning Russia's illegal occupation of Ukraine while supporting Israel's occupation of the Palestinian territories. Western leaders, pressed for weeks to say whether the loss of thousands of mostly civilian lives could be a violation of international law, spoke only tentatively, adding that they could not judge: "We're not going to get dragged into all this judge-and-jury role," US national security adviser Jake Sullivan said. By comparison, a year earlier the United States Department of State had officially announced that, based on available information, the US government assessed that members of Russia's forces in Ukraine had committed war crimes. The U.S. State Department said there is no need to launch any formal domestic investigation into whether Israel has committed war crimes, even though the weapons it uses are supplied by the US. In a speech to the European Parliament, the EU's top diplomat, Josep Borrell, said water cuts are a violation of international law regardless of where they occur, whether in Ukraine or Gaza.

In an interview, Aaron David Miller, a former State Department official, stated to The New Yorker, "Do I think that Joe Biden has the same depth of feeling and empathy for the Palestinians of Gaza as he does for the Israelis? No, he doesn't". In April 2024, the Foreign Ministry of Turkey accused the U.S. of having a "double-standard policy on human rights". Barry Trachtenberg, a professor at Wake Forest University, criticized Western support of Israeli military actions, stating, "What we're seeing is this clear double-standard where when it's in the interests of the United States and Western allies, they'll invoke international law. When it's not in their interests, they'll clearly violate international law". In July 2024, Spanish prime minister Pedro Sanchez spoke at the NATO summit in Washington D.C., urging the West to stop its "double standards" between Gaza and Ukraine.

After Israel killed the American peace activist Ayşenur Ezgi Eygi in the West Bank, another American activist who was shot by Israeli forces wrote an editorial in Time magazine, stating, "Earlier this year, President Joe Biden said that 'if you harm an American, we will respond.' Yet the Biden Administration has not even condemned my attack." The families of Americans killed by Israel also stated that the Department of Justice had failed to investigate their relatives' deaths. According to a leaked letter, Department of Justice attorneys requested Attorney General Merrick Garland to "investigate potential violations of U.S. law by Israel's government, military, and citizenry, and hold the perpetrators to account."

=== Criticisms by human rights organisations, international organizations and NGOs ===
Human rights organizations and UN officials have heavily criticized the Biden administration for vetoing multiple UN resolutions calling for an immediate ceasefire and for continuing to send arms to Israel. Palestinian president Mahmoud Abbas said the US was complicit in war crimes, and Amnesty International's Secretary General said that the veto showed that the US "displays a callous disregard for civilian suffering in the face of a staggering death toll". Doctors Without Borders said that the veto "stands in sharp contrast to the values it professes to uphold," and that the US was providing "diplomatic cover for the ongoing atrocities in Gaza". Human Rights Watch said that the veto and the military support "risks complicity in war crimes". Following the veto, a UN General Assembly resolution calling for a ceasefire garnered overwhelming support, with 153 countries voting for the resolution to 10 opposed. Turkey's president called for reform of the UN Security Council system that allows for the five permanent members to veto resolutions supported by the overwhelming majority of countries.

=== Criticism in the Middle East ===
Polling by the Arab Center for Research and Policy Studies showed 94 percent of respondents in sixteen Middle East countries had a negative view of U.S. policy in the war and 76 percent had a diminished view of the country due to its policies. In a social media post, the Palestine UN mission criticized the US secretary of state for not acknowledging the tens of thousands of killed Palestinians in his post marking the 100 days since the start of the war.

=== Criticism by other international politicians ===
On 4 February 2024, Irish MEP Mick Wallace accused the United States of lacking respect for other cultures or international law after it initiated a bombing campaign against Yemen.

Following a US veto of a UN Security Council resolution calling for an immediate ceasefire, Zhang Jun, China's ambassador to the UN, stated it was "nothing different from giving the green light to the continued slaughter".

=== Within Congress ===
==== U.S. House ====
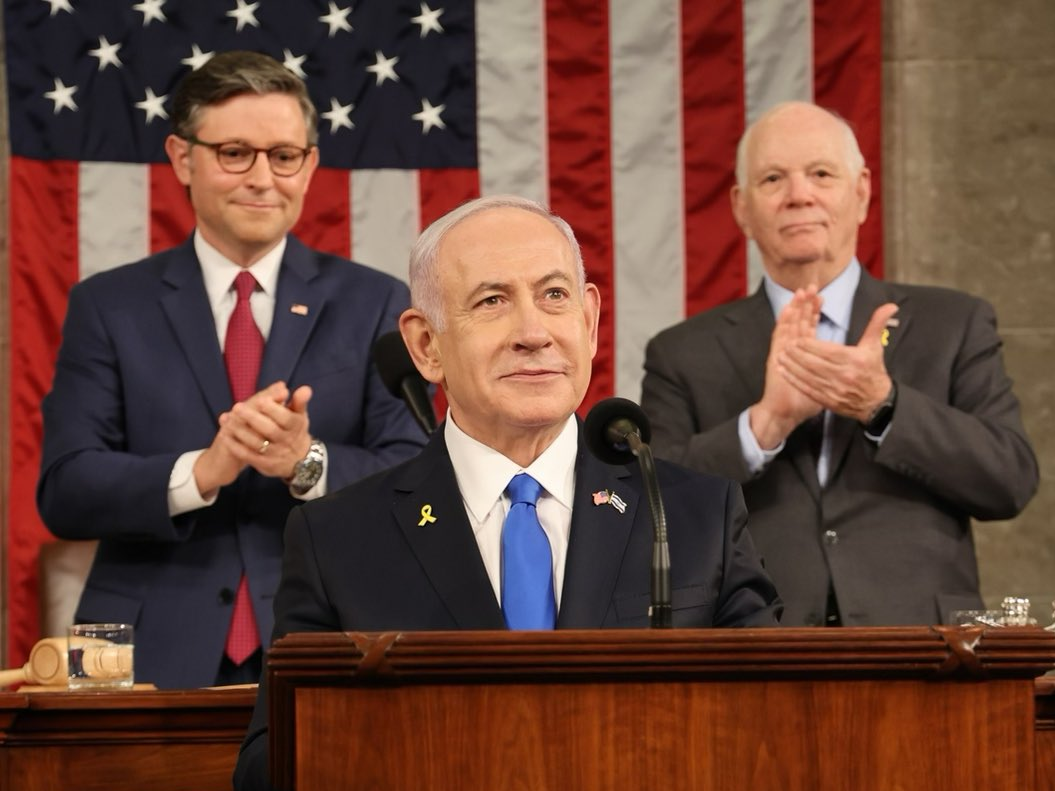
Israeli prime minister Netanyahu addresses a joint session of Congress with House Speaker Mike Johnson and Senator Ben Cardin, 24 July 2024.

On 29 October 2023, the only Palestinian-American in Congress, Rashida Tlaib (D-MI), accused Israel of committing genocide, saying, "President Biden, not all America is with you on this one, and you need to wake up and understand. We are literally watching people commit genocide." Representative Lloyd Doggett (D-TX) stated on 27 December 2023, that U.S. policy in Israel had failed. Representative Jim McGovern (D-MA) stated on 3 January 2024, that Israeli officials' statements calling for the forced displacement of Palestinians from Gaza were "reprehensible". Tlaib and Congressman Cori Bush (D-MO) released a joint statement on 12 January in support of the South Africa International Court of Justice case, stating, "The US must stop trying to discredit and undermine this case and the international legal system it claims to support." Congressmembers Ro Khanna (D-CA) and Val Hoyle (D-OR) and Senator Mike Lee (R-UT) condemned Biden's 2024 missile strikes in Yemen on 12 January, stating that only Congress has the power to approve a war. A 19 January letter from 60 Democratic Congressmembers urged U.S. secretary of state Antony Blinken to firmly condemn the forced displacement of Palestinians from Gaza. A group of a dozen Jewish Congressmembers issued a statement on 19 January condemning Netanyahu's opposition to a Palestinian state, which read, "We strongly disagree with the Prime Minister. A two-state solution is the path forward."

Texas Congressman Lloyd Doggett wrote on 24 January: "After all America has done for him, if Netanyahu 'needs to be able to say no' to us, we need to say no to him and do so now!" On 24 January, a group of five Congressmembers requested the Government Accountability Office to review whether arms transferred to Israel were being used to violate international law. Mark Pocan (D-WI) criticized Biden's decision to suspend funding to UNRWA, stating on 29 January: "UNRWA feeds 1.2 million people a day, as well as helps distribute aid now to all Palestinians in need. Aid needs to be restored now to help the displaced millions in Gaza." Chuy Garcia (D-IL) stated that the "decision to freeze UNRWA funding" should be reversed. On 11 February 2024, Congresswoman Cori Bush criticized Israel's impending invasion of Rafah, stating, "Almost half of Gaza's population has taken refuge in Rafah. There's nowhere else to go." Congressman Ro Khanna also criticized Biden's response to Israel's planned attack on Rafah, stating, "This is not the time for vague generalities about doing more to protect civilian life."

On 28 February, U.S. congresswoman Madeleine Dean (D-PA) called for an end to the war and condemned Netanyahu, stating, "Prime Minister Netanyahu's dishonesty – his broken promises to use precision strikes to protect civilians and his false claims that safe zones have been created and enforced – is unacceptable". A group of two dozen House members demanded Biden and Blinken take steps to ensure journalists' safety in Gaza, stating: "Not enough steps have been taken to safeguard the lives of the civilian population in Gaza, including journalists". On 29 February, Congressman Jim McGovern called for the U.S. to increase humanitarian aid to Gaza, stating, "Massive humanitarian support is needed to save innocent lives." A group of six U.S. House representatives – Rosa DeLauro (D-CT), Sean Casten (D-IL), Madeleine Dean, Becca Balint (D-VT), Salud Carbajal (D-CA), and Mark Takano (D-CA) – returned from a trip to Israel and released a joint statement, saying, "We are deeply worried that Prime Minister Netanyahu is moving toward the total destruction of Gaza and has demonstrated an utter disregard for Palestinian lives". Bonnie Watson Coleman (D-NJ) stated in May 2024, "We are way past the red line. We cannot continue supporting this."

In October 2024, a group of several dozen House Democrats signed a letter to the Biden Administration, urging tougher accountability regarding press access to the Gaza Strip. In November 2025, Democratic Representative Rashida Tlaib, with the support of 20 other Democratic members of Congress and more than 100 human rights groups, has introduced a resolution recognizing Israel's assault on Gaza as genocide.

==== U.S. Senate ====
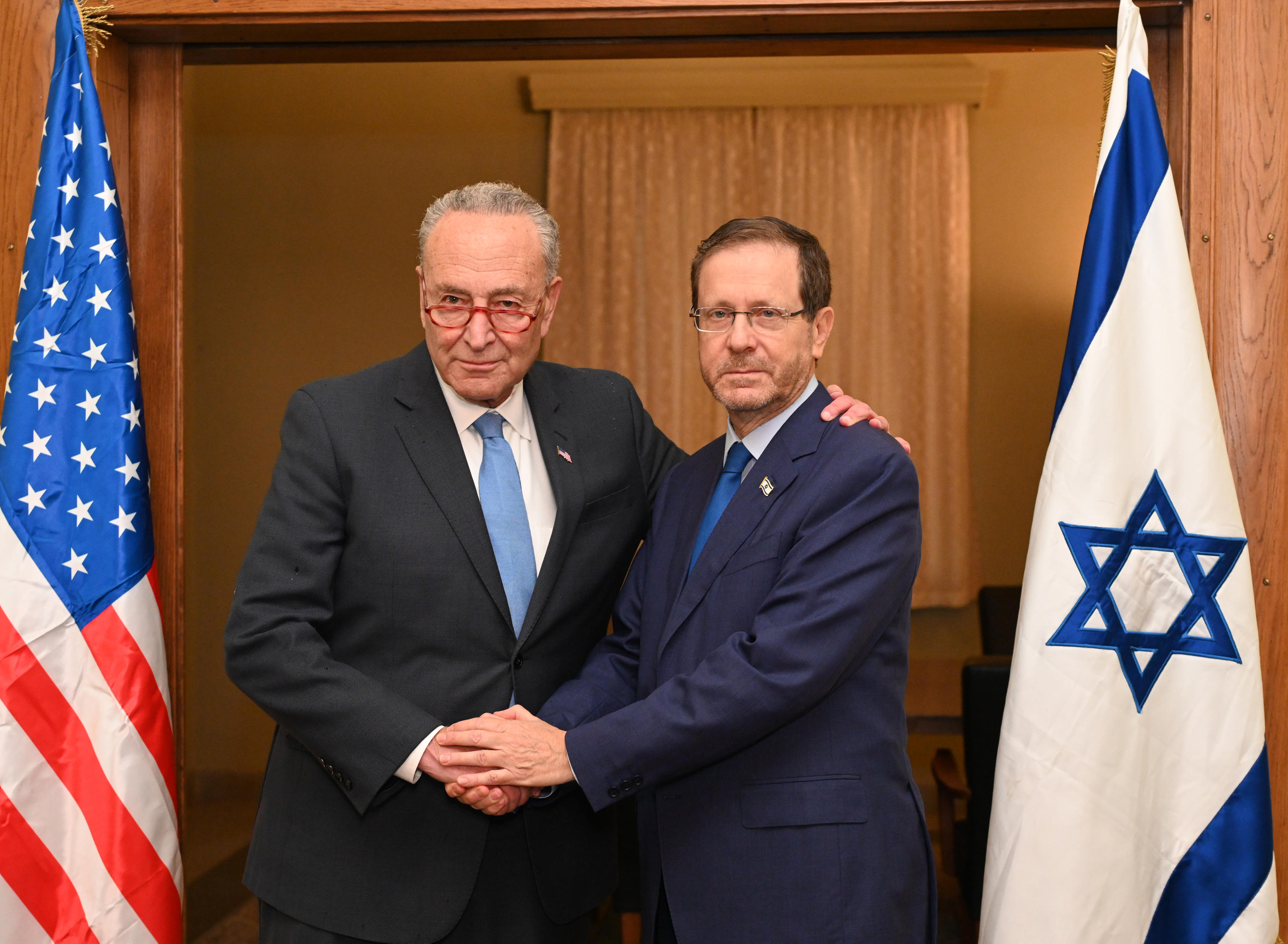
Senate Majority Leader Chuck Schumer with Israeli President Herzog in Tel Aviv, Israel, 15 October 2023

On 2 November 2023, Senator Dick Durbin (D-IL) became the first U.S. senator to call for a permanent ceasefire. He was followed by Jeff Merkley (D-OR) later that same month. On 23 December 2023, US senator Chris Van Hollen (D-MD), stated, "There's a big gap between what the United States says is essential, and what the Netanyahu government is prepared to do. And when you see these big gaps, the United States looks feckless." US senator Tim Kaine (D-VA) criticized Biden's emergency sale of weapons to Israel on 30 December 2023, stating, "Why should the Admin bypass Congress on arms sales to any nation? Bypassing Congress = keeping the American public in the dark." U.S. senator Bernie Sanders (I-VT) forced a vote on 17 January 2024, on a resolution requiring the State Department to explore whether U.S. weapons were being used to violate international humanitarian law.

On 7 February 2024, U.S. senator Chris Murphy (D-CT) stated he would support an amendment requiring weapons sold internationally to be used in compliance with U.S. law, international humanitarian law, and the laws of armed conflict. In a speech on 13 February, Senator Chris Van Hollen accused the Israeli government of committing war crimes in Gaza, stating, "Kids in Gaza are now dying from the deliberate withholding of food. That is a war crime. It is a textbook war crime. And that makes those who orchestrate it war criminals." On 9 March, Senator Bernie Sanders criticized members of Congress, stating, "It is absurd to criticise Netanyahu's war in one breath and provide another $10bn to continue that war in the next." On 29 April, Senator Van Hollen of Maryland there was "serious doubt on the integrity of the process in the Biden administration for reviewing whether the Netanyahu government is complying with international law in Gaza".

In May 2024, Bernie Sanders asked how the U.S. would be able to criticize other countries' human rights abuses if it ignored the "crimes against humanity" committed in Gaza. In June 2024, Senator Chris Van Hollen urged sanctions against Israeli finance minister Bezalel Smotrich during a U.S. congressional subcommittee meeting. In September 2025, Senators Van Hollen and Jeff Merkley, after returning from a congressional delegation trip to the Middle East, said that Israel was operating under a systematic plan to destroy and ethnically cleanse Palestinians from Gaza in order to force the local population to leave, and they said that the United States was complicit. In September 2025, Bernie Sanders became the first US senator to say that Israel was committing genocide in Gaza.

In September 2026, Sen. Jeanne Shaheen, the top Democrat on the Senate Foreign Relations Committee, placed a hold on a $2.8 billion weapons sale to Israel that included 40,000 one-ton bombs. Shaheen cited Prime Minister Benjamin Netanyahu's failure to address concerns over civilian deaths in Gaza, Israeli strikes in Syria, and settler violence against Palestinians in the West Bank.

=== Within the Biden administration ===
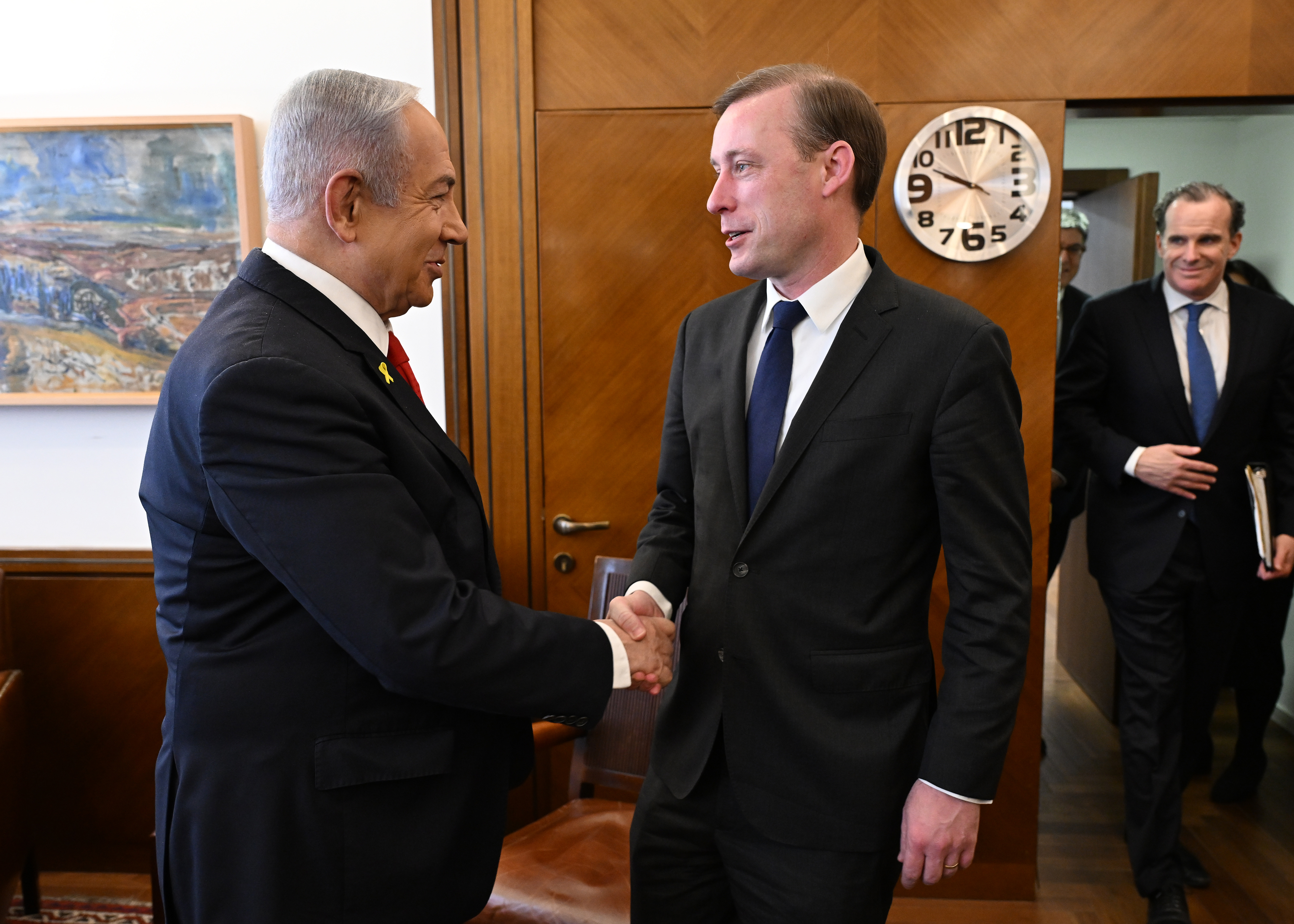
Benjamin Netanyahu with Biden's National Security Adviser Jake Sullivan and White House Middle East advisor Brett McGurk (right), 12 December 2024

In January 2024, a letter was signed by more than a dozen Biden campaign staffers calling for condition of US support to Israel and a ceasefire. Paul told The Guardian that the administration is witnessing "pretty extraordinary levels of dissent". On 2 February 2024, a group of 800 U.S. and European officials signed an open letter stating their governments' policies were weakening their nations' "moral standing". Following the World Central Kitchen drone strikes on 1 April 2024, internal dissent within the Biden administration on the issue of weapons sales to Israel increased.

During a February 2024 meeting between U.S. diplomats, humanitarian workers, and USAID director Samantha Power, staff were reportedly "visibly upset" with the administration's policy, with some wearing keffiyehs in protest and others breaking down into tears.

Jake Sullivan, former national security advisor to Biden, admitted in an interview published in January 2025 that he had doubts about whether the Biden administration had done the right thing in continuing supporting Israel with arms because of the "immense human suffering in Gaza".

==== Resignations ====
By 7 January 2024, two officials from the Biden administration—Josh Paul and Tariq Habash, working on arms sale at the State Department and policy adviser at the Department of Education respectively—had resigned in opposition to US support to Israel's war efforts. In March 2024, another State Department staffer working on human rights, Anelle Sheline, resigned over the administration's support to the war, in particular its bypassing of Congress to authorize the sale of weapons to Israel. In April 2024, the U.S. State Department Arabic spokesperson resigned in protest of the administration's Gaza policy. In May 2024, Lily Greenberg Call, the special assistant to the Interior Department's chief of staff, resigned in protest of Biden's Gaza policies. On 30 May, a senior State Department official resigned, stating U.S. statements that Israel was not blocking humanitarian aid into Gaza were false. In June 2024, the twelve public Biden administration resignees signed a joint statement calling Biden's Gaza policy "a failure and a threat to U.S. national security". In July 2024, a political appointee in the Department of the Interior resigned in protest of Biden's Gaza policies.

=== In the U.S. military ===
On 25 February 2024, Aaron Bushnell, a 25-year-old serviceman of the United States Air Force, died after setting himself on fire outside the front gate of the Embassy of Israel in Washington, D.C., declaring that he would "no longer be complicit in genocide".

In May 2024, US Army Major Harrison Mann resigned in protest of Biden's Gaza policies. In June 2024, an Air Force engineer resigned in protest of the United States' "complicit[ity] in the genocide in Gaza". Later the same month, two U.S. Air Force enlistees stated they were seeking conscientious objector status due to the United States' support for Israel's action in Gaza.

=== Muslim and Arab Americans ===
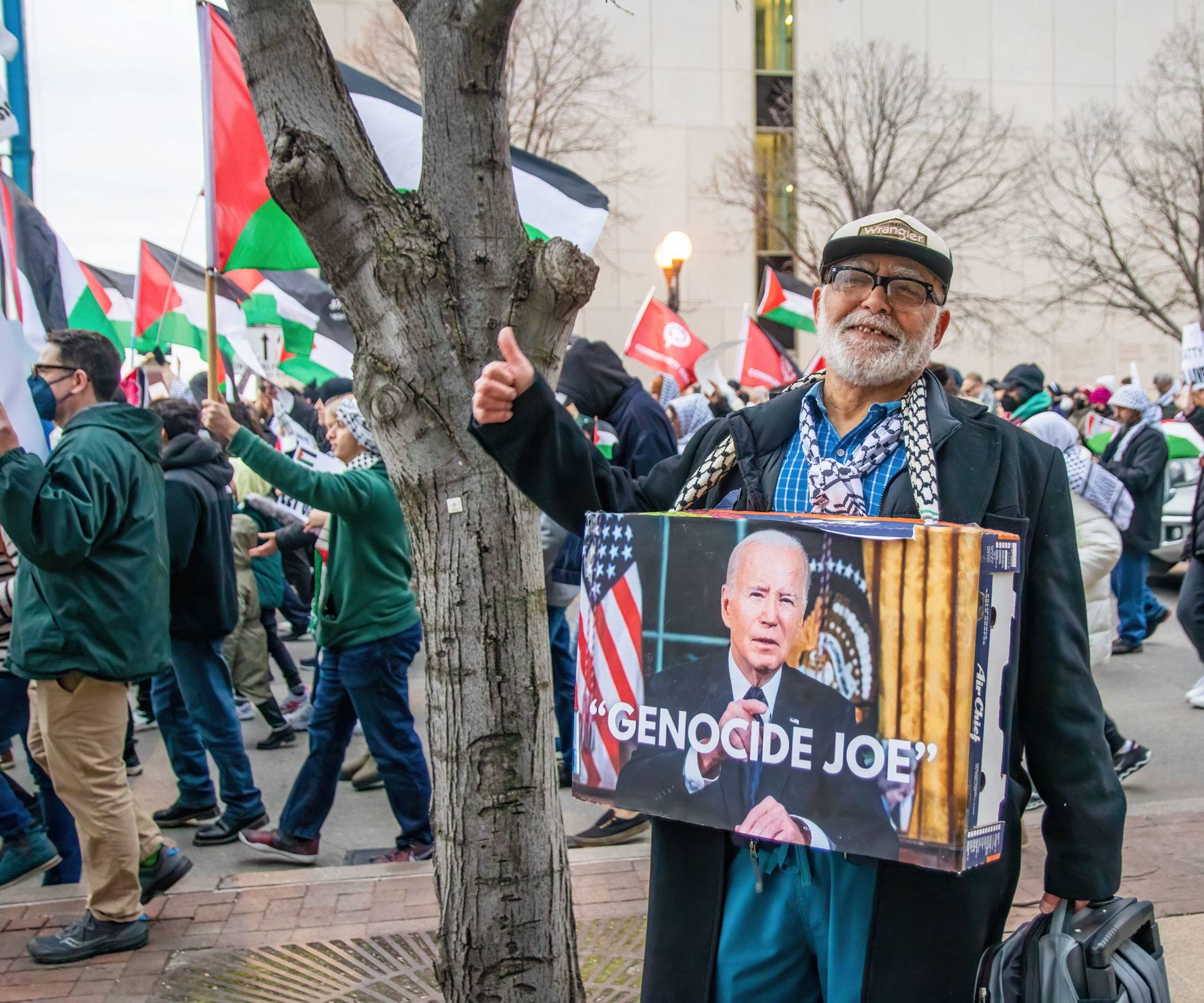
A protestor in Columbus, Ohio, carrying a sign referring to United States President Joe Biden as "Genocide Joe", 22 December 2023

Amongst the Muslim and Arab American communities, there was strong backlash to US support of Israel, with some vowing to abstain from supporting Biden in the 2024 presidential election. Palestinian-Americans with family in Gaza were reportedly "pleading with the U.S. government to evacuate their family members". Some, including former-Congressman Justin Amash, reported the death of family members from Israeli airstrikes. American citizens stuck in Gaza also criticized the United States government's response to the conflict. In a meeting with Biden's campaign chair Julie Chávez Rodriguez, the publisher of Arab American News reportedly told her, "If this man wants our vote, he has to do more than Jesus Christ – bring a lot more dead back to life. Thousands of people's blood is on his hands." In response to late-February 2024 reports that Biden again planned to veto a UN resolution for a ceasefire, the US Campaign for Palestinian Rights stated, "Our government is beyond evil."

During the Michigan Democratic primary, Biden received less than a quarter of the vote in predominantly Arab areas in Dearborn. In 2024, Dearborn Mayor Abdullah Hammoud declined an invitation to meet with Biden campaign officials prior to the 2024 United States presidential election, due to the Biden administration's stance on the Israel-Hamas war. On Super Tuesday, nearly 20% of voters in Minnesota voted uncommitted in protest of Biden's Gaza policies. In March 2024, a coalition of Muslim and Palestinian organizations from Chicago refused a meeting with the Biden campaign, stating, "There is no point in more meetings".

=== Internal public opinion ===
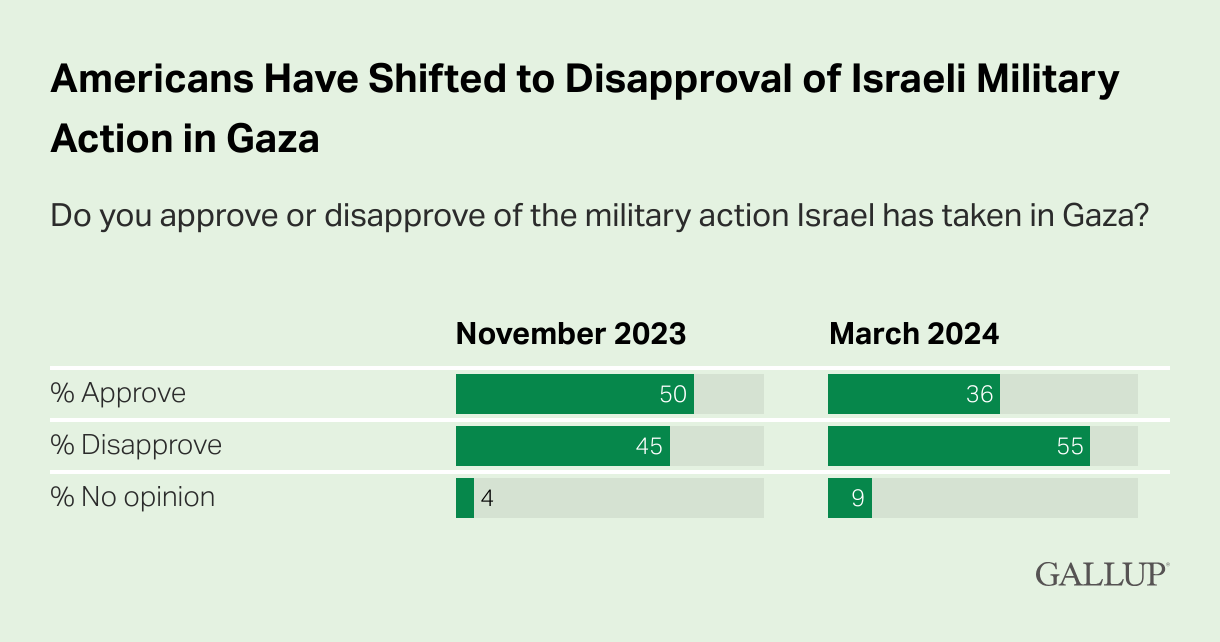
Gallup poll showing US change from majority approval (Nov. 2023) to majority disapproval (March 2024) of Israeli military action in Gaza

In a Reuters/Ipsos poll released on 15 November 2023, 32% of respondents said that the U.S. should support Israel, 39% said that the U.S. should be a neutral mediator, 4% said that the U.S. should support Palestinians, and 15% said the U.S. shouldn't be involved at all.

In a Gallup poll released on 30 November 2023, 50% of the U.S. respondents approved of Israel's military action in Gaza, and 45% disapproved. In November 2023, the Jewish Election Institute found that 74% of Jewish American registered voters approved of the Biden administration's handling of the war.

In a Data for Progress poll released on 5 December 2023, 61% of likely voters, including a majority of Democrats (76%) and Independents (57%) and a plurality of Republicans (49%), supported the U.S. calling for a permanent ceasefire and a de-escalation of violence in Gaza; 83% of Democrats, 74% of Independents, and 63% of Republicans supported sending food, water, and medical supplies to people in Gaza; 77% of Democrats, 63% of Independents, and 55% of Republicans supported ensuring that people in Gaza have reliable access to fuel and electricity; and 63% of voters, including 65% of those under age 45, agreed with the statement that "The U.S. should hold its ally Israel to a high standard and only provide military aid to Israel if they meet our standards for human rights."

In a New York Times/Siena College poll released on 19 December 2023, 44 percent of voters said that Israel should stop its military campaign to protect against civilian casualties, and 39 percent said that Israel should continue its military campaign even if it means that civilian casualties in Gaza mount. 57% of voters said that they disapproved of President Biden's handling of the Israeli-Palestinian conflict, whereas 33% approved.

In an Economist/YouGov poll released on 24 January 2024, 35% of U.S. adults agreed that Israel's military campaign against Palestinians amounts to genocide, 36% disagreed, and 29% were undecided. Among U.S. citizens aged 18–29, 49% of those surveyed agreed that Israel is committing genocide, with 24% disagreeing, and 27% uncertain.

In an Associated Press-NORC Center for Public Affairs Research poll released on 2 February 2024, 50% of U.S. adults said that the military response from Israel in the Gaza Strip had gone too far, whereas 31% said that it had "been about right", and 15% thought that it had "not gone far enough".

As of 25 February 2024, over 70 cities in the United States have voted for a ceasefire.

In a Gallup poll released on 4 March 2024, positive opinions of Israel had dropped from 64% to 38% amongst young people aged 18 to 34. Overall, 58% of Americans had a positive view of Israel.

In a Center for Economic and Policy Research poll released on 5 March 2024, 52% of U.S. citizens supported ending arms transfers to Israel. 62% of Democrats supported halting arms sales, while 14% disagreed, whereas 30% of Republicans supported the measure, and 55% opposed it.

In a Gallup poll released on 27 March 2024, 55% of the responders disapproved of Israel's military action in Gaza, 36% approved, and 9% had no opinion.

In a Data for Progress poll, in collaboration with Zeteo, released on 8 May 2024, 83% of Democrats, 56% of Republicans, and 70% of all likely voters supported the United States calling for a permanent ceasefire a de-escalation of violence in Gaza; 56% of Democrats, 23% of Republicans, and 39% of all likely voters believed that Israel is committing genocide against Palestinians in Gaza, with 22% of Democrats, 19% of Republicans, and 23% of all likely voters being uncertain regarding the issue; and 55% of Democrats, 36% of Republicans, and 46% of all likely voters said that they disapprove of college campuses limiting students' rights and abilities to protest against Israel's military operations, whereas 32% of Democrats, 49% of Republicans, and 40% of all likely voters approved of doing so.

A YouGov poll released on 21 May 2024, and conducted in the key swing states Arizona, Michigan, Minnesota, Pennsylvania, and Wisconsin, with a highly representative sample of 500 registered Democratic and Independent voters, found that between 74.1% and 82.8% of the respondents supported an immediate and permanent ceasefire, depending on the state, and that between 19.2% and 24.2% of the respondents are less likely to vote for Biden in the 2024 United States presidential election because of his handling of the war in Gaza. Over 40% of the polled voters in each state stated that the combination of imposing a lasting ceasefire and conditioning aid to Israel would make them more likely to vote for Biden.

A CBS News poll released on 9 June 2024, found that 61 percent of all Americans think that the United States should not send weapons and supplies to Israel, including 77 percent of Democrats and nearly 40 percent of Republicans.

According to a Data for Progress poll released on 12 June 2024, 64% of all likely voters, including 86% of Democrats, 64% of Independents, 62% of swing voters, and 43% of Republicans supported Joe Biden's proposed ceasefire deal in Gaza, with the specifics: "A complete ceasefire and withdrawal of Israeli forces from Gaza. The release of Israeli hostages in exchange for hundreds of Palestinian prisoners. A surge of humanitarian aid into Gaza. Allowing displaced Palestinians to return to their homes in northern Gaza and starting a 3-5 year reconstruction plan for the region, backed by the United States, Europe, and international institutions". The survey also found a 53% sum total majority support for withdrawing military aid from Israel if it rejected the ceasefire proposal, including 70% of Democrats, 51% of Independents, 53% of swing voters, and 35% of Republicans, with 36% being against it.

According to a Chicago Council on Global Affairs poll released on 6 August 2024, and conducted online between 21 June and 1 July 55% of all sum total respondents oppose using US troops to defend Israel if it is attacked by a neighboring country, whereas 41% support it.

According to a Pew Research in 2025, more than half of American adults (53%) express an unfavorable opinion of Israel, compared to 42% in March 2022 - before 7 October 2023. After nearly two years of war, the American people support the Palestinians against Israel for the first time.

According to a Washington Post poll from October 2025, 61% of US Jews believe that Israel has committed war crimes in Gaza, while 39% believe that Israel is committing genocide.

An Associated Press-NORC Center for Public Affairs Research poll conducted in June 2026 found that 58% of Democrats believed the US was too supportive of Israel, compared with 45% in January 2024. The poll also found that a majority of Democrats believed the US was not providing enough support to Palestinians and highlighted growing partisan differences over U.S. policy toward Israel and the Gaza war.

=== Israeli officials ===
Some Israeli government members believed that Biden's support for Israel was not strong enough. In an interview with the Wall Street Journal, Israel's Minister of National Security Itamar Ben-Gvir stated, "Instead of giving us his full backing, Biden is busy with giving humanitarian aid and fuel [to Gaza], which goes to Hamas. If Trump was in power, the U.S. conduct would be completely different." Israel's Minister of Finance Bezalel Smotrich stated Biden was involved in an anti-Semitic lie for issuing sanctions against violent West Bank settlers. (Note: Smotrich later stated the sanctions were designed to create a "Palestinian terror state".) Following comments by Biden in March 2024 that Israel's killing of civilians was "hurting Israel more than helping", the Israeli prime minister Netanyahu stated this was "false" and "wrong". After a speech by Chuck Schumer calling for new elections after the war, Likud released a statement, saying, "Senator Schumer is expected to respect Israel's elected government and not undermine it. This is always true and even more so in wartime."

On 27 March, Ben-Gvir stated, "Biden prefers the line of Rashida Tlaib and Sinwar to the line of Benjamin Netanyahu and Ben-Gvir. I would have expected the president of the United States not to take their line, but rather to take ours." Following reports the U.S. was considering sanctions against an IDF unit charged with human rights abuses, the Israeli Prime Minister Benjamin Netanyahu called the sanctions the "height of absurdity and a moral low". Diaspora Minister Amichai Chikli stated, "If I were an American citizen with the right to vote, I'd vote for Trump and Republicans". In response to the Biden administration stating it was considering halting weapons transfers to Israel for its Rafah offensive, Ben-Gvir tweeted, "Hamas loves Biden". In June 2024, Netanyahu criticized the Biden administration for what he called a "dramatic drop" in weapons deliveries.

Senior Israeli officials stated that Donald Trump's campaign promise to quickly end the war in Gaza would cause challenges for the Israeli government if he were to win the 2024 election, due to Israel's "internal political constraints to ending the war quickly".

== Reactions ==
=== Inside the U.S. ===
==== October reactions ====
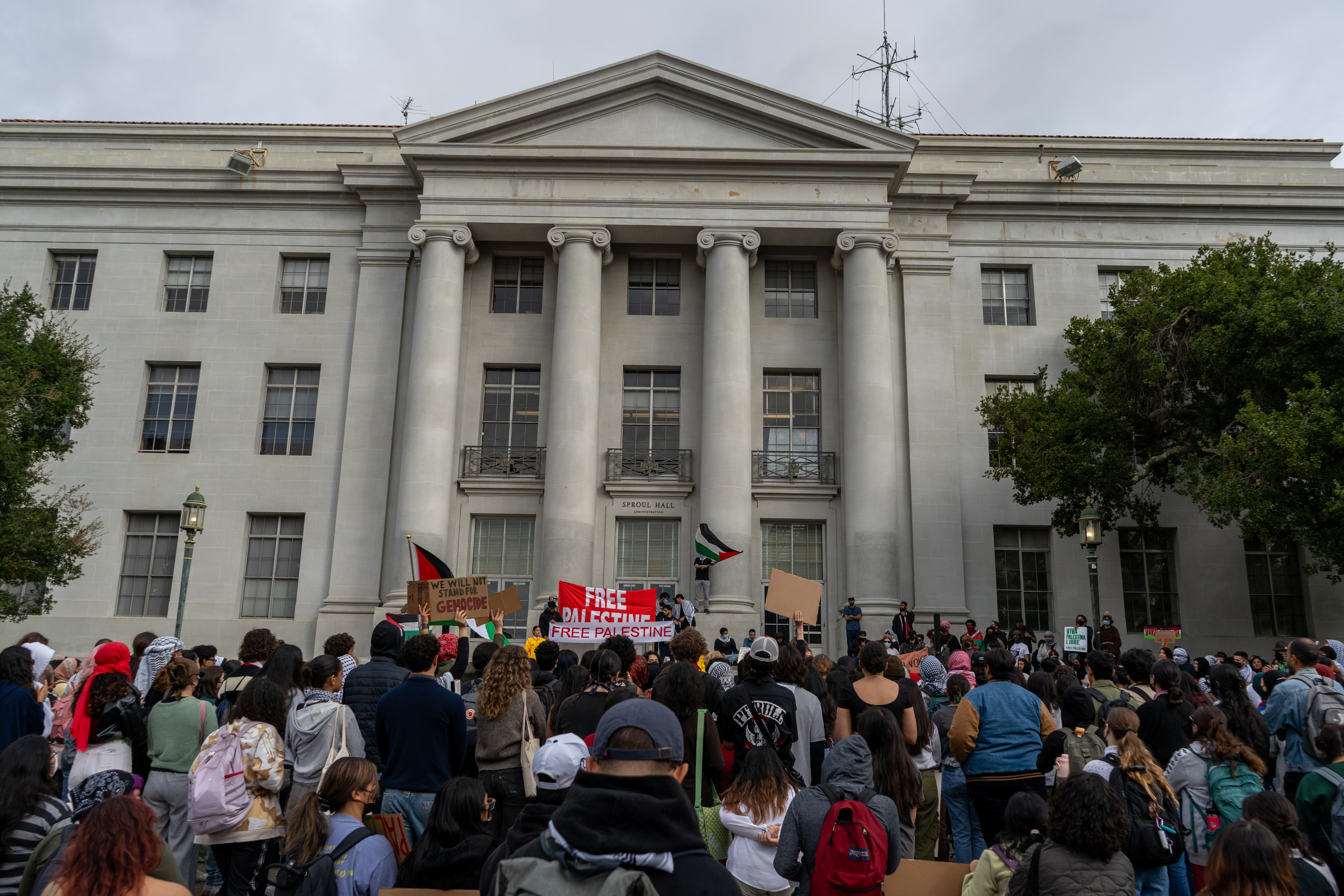
Pro-Palestinian protest outside Sproul Hall at the University of California, Berkeley, 25 October 2023

- Eva Borgwardt, the political director of IfNotNow, a progressive Jewish organization, stated: "The White House and many in the US government are clear as they should be that 1,000 Israelis killed is too many, Our question for them is: How many Palestinian deaths are too many?"
- Alexandra Rojas, the executive director of Justice Democrats, begged the president to take immediate action to stop a ground invasion that would "ensure thousands more civilian casualties, bring us closer to an all-out regional conflict in the Middle East, and thrust the United States into another endless war" in a statement released amid increasing bombing and a communications blackout in Gaza.
- A Quinnipiac study done following the Gaza war revealed that 76 percent of voters believed supporting Israel is in the national interest of the United States, and 64 percent approved of sending weapons and military equipment to Israel. This support was more pronounced among older age groups, with 51% of those under 35 disapproving of this action.
- An NPR/PBS NewsHour/Marist poll showed that 48% of millennials and members of Generation Z thought that the US should voice support for Israel.
- Democrats' opinion of Biden's job dropped by 11 percent during October 2023. According to Gallup, Biden alienated some members of his own party with his swift and decisive show of support for Israel.
- US Republican Congressman and former aide to Donald Trump, Max Miller, speaking at Fox News stated that Palestine is "about to get eviscerated ... to turn that into a parking lot". He previously called on the Biden administration "to get out of Israel's way and to let Israel do what it needs to do best" and said there should be "no rules of engagement" during Israel's bombardment of Gaza. Miller also questioned the accuracy of the Gaza Health Ministry's claim that 10,000 people had been killed in Gaza.

==== November reactions ====
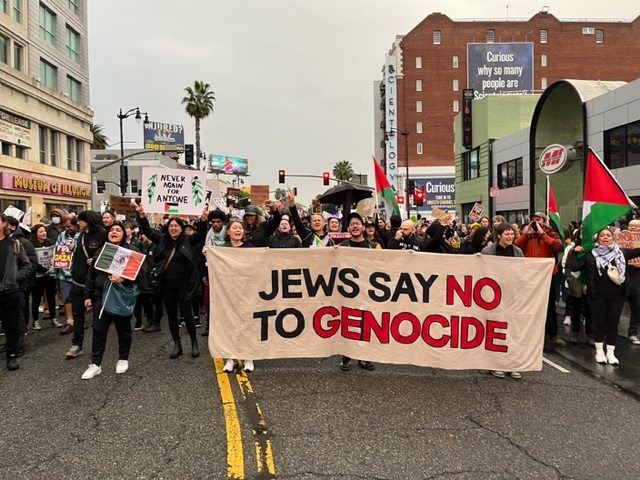
Pro-Palestinian protest in Los Angeles against the war in Gaza and Hollywood's role in dehumanizing Muslims, November 2023

- On 1 November 2023, the Republican representative, Brian Mast, compared all Palestinians to Nazis on the House floor.
- A team of legal experts alerted the Biden administration and the ICC prosecutor that the U.S. government might be legally implicated in Israel's ongoing war against the Palestinians.
- The executive director of DAWN, Sarah Leah Whitson, stated that Biden's funding request "isn't just giving a green light for ethnic cleansing—it's bankrolling it."
- Barack Obama in an interview emphasized "nobody's hands are clean."
- The Center for Constitutional Rights (CCR) sued Joe Biden and two of his cabinet colleagues (On behalf of Palestinian human rights organizations, Palestinians living in Gaza, and US citizens with family in the besieged region) for their failure to stop and aiding and abetting "genocide" in Gaza. US citizen Laila al-Haddad, one of the case's plaintiffs (who has lost five relatives in Gaza as a result of Israel's attacks) said: "I paid for Israel to kill my cousins and my aunt, there's no two ways around it, It was my tax dollars that did that."
- In November 2023, Bin Laden's "Letter to the American people," published in 2002, went viral on TikTok and other social media. In the letter, Bin Laden denounced numerous acts of American aggression such as U.S. support for Israel, and supported al-Qaeda's war against the U.S. as a defensive struggle. Numerous social media users, including Americans, expressed their opposition to US foreign policy by widely sharing the letter and its contents. The letter was removed from The Guardian website after more than 20 years of being present online in the news outlet's webpage, and TikTok began issuing takedowns of videos featuring the letter. Reporting in The Washington Post suggested that the virality of the letter had been limited prior to media coverage, having never trended on TikTok, that many of the TikTok videos covering the letter were critical of bin Laden, and that the media coverage had exaggerated its significance and elevated the virality of the letter.
- Angie Nixon (D), a member of the Florida House of Representatives, sponsored a resolution calling for "de-escalation" and a ceasefire. The resolution was rejected by a vote of 104 to 2, but there was controversy during the legislative debate. Nixon said: "We are at 10,000 dead Palestinians. How many will be enough?" State Representative Michelle Salzman (R) replied, "All of them." Some commentators called Salzman's remark a call for genocide. Nixon and the Florida chapter of the Council on American–Islamic Relations called for Salzman to be censured or resign. The executive director of the US Campaign for Palestinian Rights (USCPR), Ahmad Abuznaid, said, "There is a bipartisan effort to dehumanize the Palestinian people".
- In March of 2024, The Washington Post reported that in November of 2023, U.S. Senator Chris Van Hollen had received a classified briefing on the Al-Shifa Hospital Siege and told the paper that there were "important and subtle differences" between what the Biden administration was saying and the actual intelligence on al-Shifa. The Biden administration denied the Senator's statements.

==== December reactions ====
- A 19 December New York Times/Siena College poll found 57 percent of Americans disapproved of Joe Biden's handling of the conflict, with a plurality supporting Israel ending its military actions to protect civilians. Three quarters of 18-to-29 year olds disapproved of Biden's handling, with half saying Israel was intentionally killing civilians and three-fourths saying it was not taking enough precautions for civilians.
- Polling conducted by Shibley Telhami at the University of Maryland, College Park showed the number of Democrats under 35 less likely to vote for Biden due to the war had grown to 21 percent in just a two-week period.
- Former Republican Representative Michele Bachmann appearing in The Charlie Kirk Show stated "So, it's time that Gaza ends. The two million people who live there – they are clever assassins. They need to be removed from that land. That land needs to be turned into a national park. And since they're the voluntary mercenaries for Iran, they need to be dropped on the doorstep of Iran. Let Iran deal with those people." She received a round of applause from the audience, while Kirk replied "I look at Israel and Israel says we never want another person into our country that doesn't share our values," Kirk said. "They said they don't want refugees. They don't want any of these people. I want American immigration policy to be like that."

==== January reactions ====
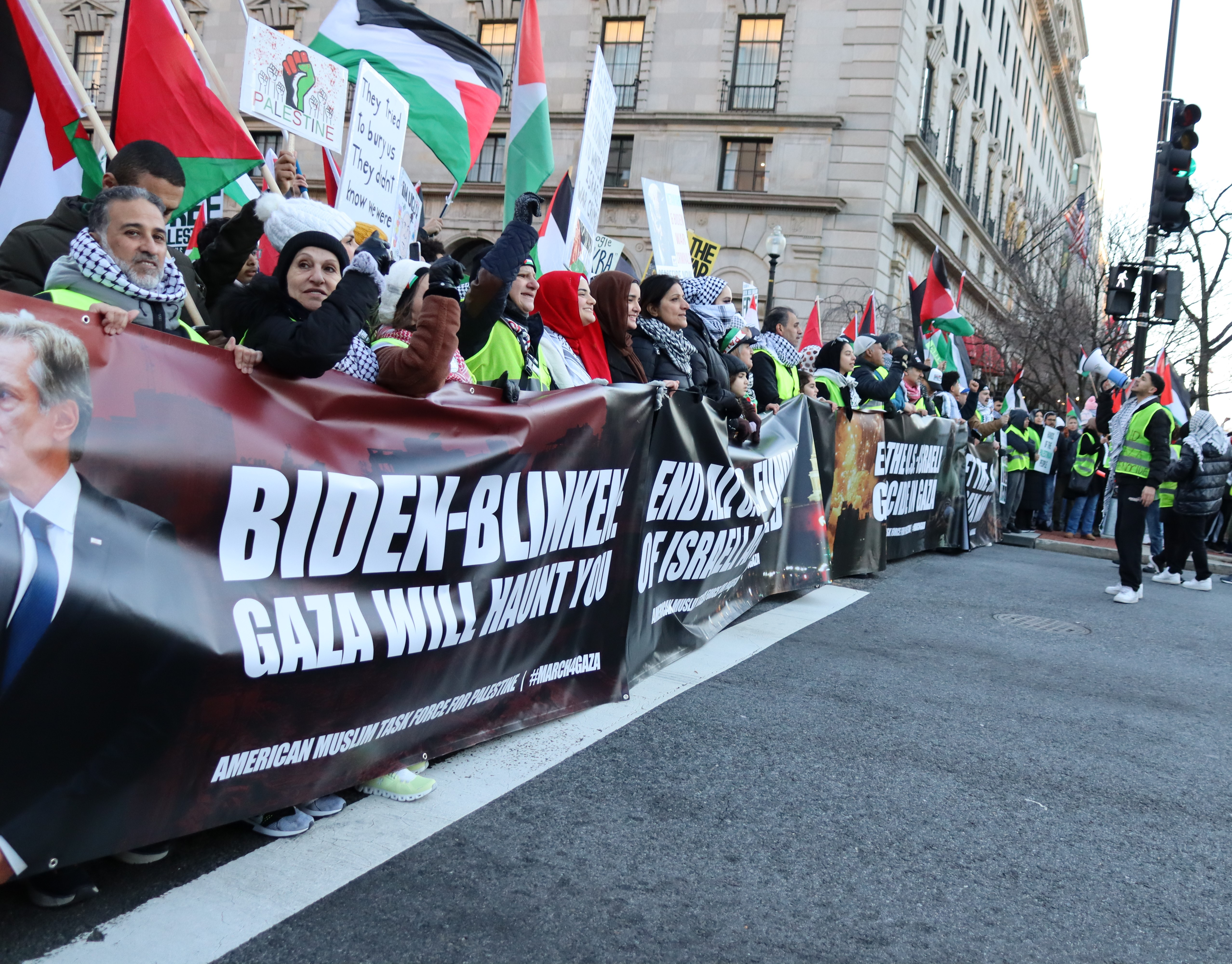
March on Washington for Gaza in January 2024

- Tariq Habash, a policy adviser at the US Department of Education resigned, stating, "I cannot represent an administration that systematically dehumanizes Palestinians and enables their ethnic cleansing."
- Harvard University political scientist Stephen Walt stated, "Biden looks heartless or clueless (or both) and many see him as no better than Trump."
- The Center for Civilians in Conflict called the failure of Sanders' resolution to investigate Israeli compliance with international law by 72-to-11 "deeply disappointing".
- Aaron David Miller, a former-State Department official, stated Joe Biden's policies had turned the United States into "Israel's lawyer".
- According to the poll conducted by the Harvard CAPS–Harris Poll on 17–18 January 2024, 67% of American respondents said that a ceasefire in Gaza should only happen after all Israeli hostages are released and Hamas is removed from power. 74% of American respondents believed that the Hamas attack was genocidal, while 34% of respondents believed that Israel was committing genocide.
- An Economist/YouGov poll found 49 percent of 18-29-year-olds agreed with the statement that Israel is committing genocide, and 49 percent of registered Democrats also agreeing that Israel was committing genocide.
- In an op-ed, Bernie Sanders wrote, "The United States must stop asking Israel to do the right thing. It's time to start telling Israel it must do these things or it will lose our support."
- The Arizona Democratic Party passed a resolution calling for a ceasefire.
- The cities of San Francisco and Chicago passed resolutions calling for a ceasefire.
- On 31 January 2024, the Republican representative Brian Mast said that Palestinian babies are "terrorists" who should be killed, that more infrastructure in Gaza must be destroyed, and "It would be better if you kill all the terrorists and kill everyone who are supporters."

==== February reactions ====
- Polling by the Associated Press-NORC Center for Public Affairs Research found 50 percent of U.S. adults believed that Israel's offensive in Gaza had gone too far.
- Joe Biden faced large protests during campaign stops in Michigan, with one demonstrator stating, "There is nothing that will ever make me vote for a genocidal president, ever."
- An NBC News poll found only 15 percent of under-35-year-old voters approved of Biden's approach to the war, with 70 percent disapproving.
- The Minneapolis City Council overrode a mayoral veto to pass a ceasefire resolution.
- U.S. representative Rashida Tlaib called Netanyahu a "genocidal maniac" during a speech in Congress.
- CAIR criticized Biden for failing to protect U.S. citizens killed by Israel, including Tawfiq Ajaq and Shireen Abu Akleh.
- A survey by the Institute for Social Policy and Understanding found a majority in the U.S. supported a ceasefire.
- The council of bishops of the African Methodist Episcopal Church called on the U.S. to immediately cease funding Israel or providing other support, stating, "After this torture, they plan to murder them. The United States of America will have likely paid for the weapons they use. This must not be allowed to happen."
- The director of the Council on American-Islamic Relations, Nihad Awad, stated, "President Biden should stop acting like Benjamin Netanyahu's defense lawyer and start acting like the President of the United States".
- Professor Stephen Zunes stated Biden's Gaza policy was even more unpopular amongst young voters than Nixon's Vietnam War policy had been in the 1970s.
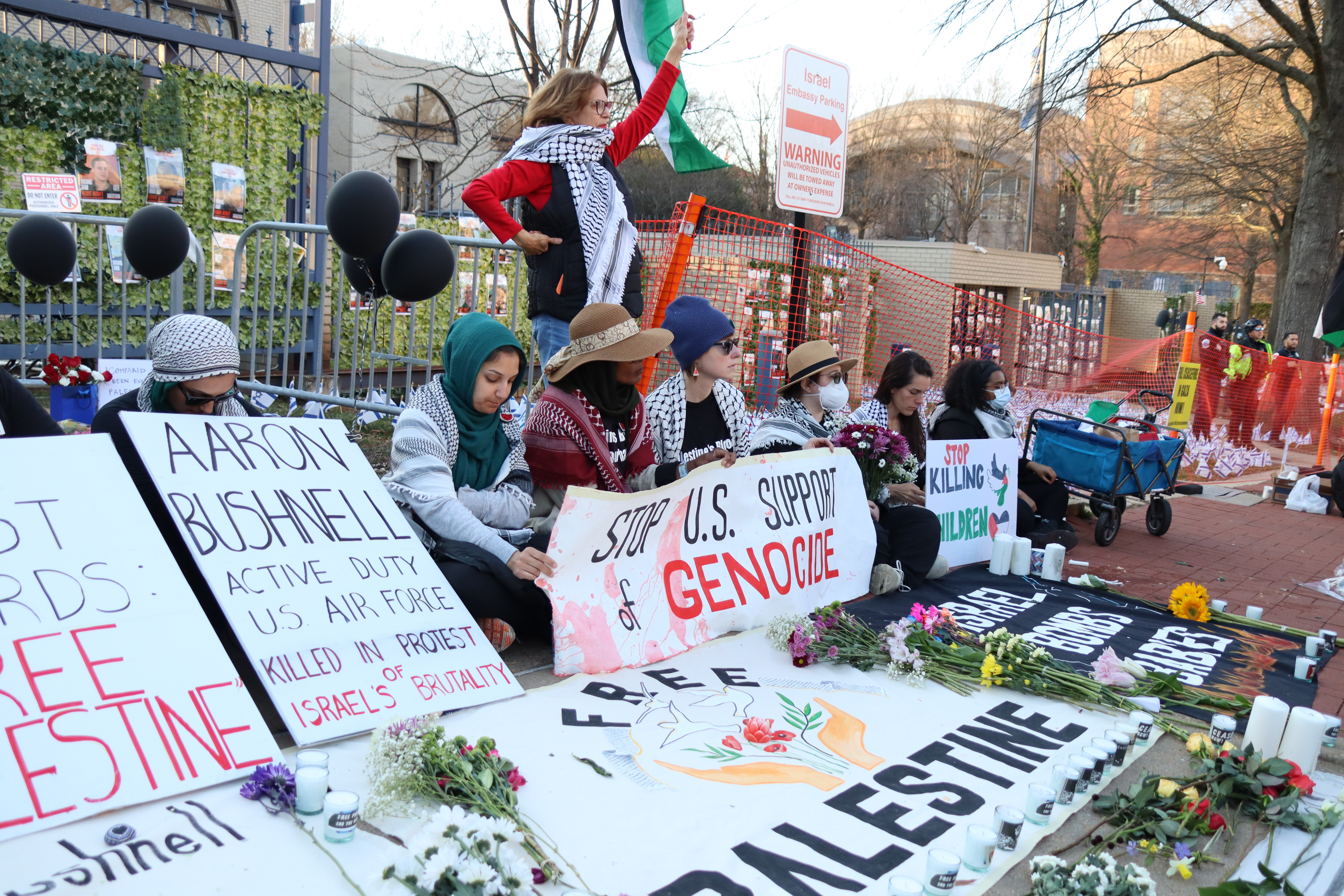
  A 26 February 2024 vigil outside the Israeli embassy in Washington, D.C. with a sign accusing the United States of supporting genocide
- On 25 February 2024, Aaron Bushnell, a 25-year-old serviceman of the United States Air Force, committed an act of self-immolation outside the front gate of the Embassy of Israel in Washington, D.C. in protest of the ongoing US support of the war. He declared that he "will no longer be complicit in genocide" before dousing himself in flammable liquid and setting himself on fire. He repeatedly shouted "Free Palestine" as he was burning. After first responders extinguished the flames, he was taken to a local hospital in critical condition where he later died. Commenting on the incident, Pentagon Press Secretary Patrick S. Ryder reaffirmed US support for Israel's operations.
- UCLA professor Dov Waxman stated, "It is telling that most American voters – both Democrats and Republicans – don't approve, according to the surveys, of the way that President Biden's been handling this war".

==== March reactions ====
- Former-Ambassador Robert Stephen Ford stated that the U.S. being forced to deliver aid by airdrop was the "worst humiliation" of the U.S. by Israel he had ever seen, aside from the USS Liberty incident.
- A Gallup poll found positive opinions of Israel dropped from 64 percent to 38 percent amongst people aged 18-to-34.
- A poll by the Institute for Social Policy and Understanding found that Muslim Americans were eight times more likely to support a candidate who called for a ceasefire.
- A CAIR poll found 72 percent of U.S. Muslims disapproved of Biden's stance on the war.
- A CEPR poll found 52% of Americans supported ending arms transfers to Israel.
- Protesters blocked Pennsylvania Avenue in protest of Biden's 2024 State of the Union Address, with one demonstrator stating, "No more genocide with our tax dollars".
- The Arab American Institute condemned Congress' ban on UNRWA funding, stating, "Our political process has chosen to cut US funding to literally the only entity that can address the level of suffering and scale of suffering that's happening in Gaza right now".
- In an interview with Fox News on 5 March 2024, the former president and presumptive Republican presidential candidate Donald Trump stated that Joe Biden "dumped Israel" due to being overly influenced by pro-Palestinian protests, that "The Democrats are very bad for Israel," that he supports Israel's ongoing offensive on Gaza in which Israel has to "finish the problem", and that the Biden administration "got soft". Trump's campaign also said that, if elected again, he would bar Gaza residents from entering the U.S. as part of an expanded travel ban, which commentators has viewed as a call to continue and "double down" on genocidal acts. In another interview with Fox News, Benjamin Netanyahu said "I appreciate President Trump's tremendous support for Israel."
- Donald Trump later also stated that "Israel has to be very careful because you're losing a lot of the world, you're losing a lot of support."
- Donald Trump's son-in-law Jared Kushner, senior foreign policy adviser under Trump's presidency, stated that "Gaza's waterfront property could be very valuable", that Israel should bulldoze an area of the Negev desert and move Palestinians there, and that the Palestinians having their own state is "a super bad idea" that "would essentially be rewarding an act of terror".
- In a town hall meeting on 25 March 2024, the Republican US House representative Tim Walberg of Michigan stated that Palestinian civilians should have nuclear weapons used against them, "like Nagasaki and Hiroshima" (the Japanese cities where the US dropped atomic bombs at the end of World War Two, killing hundreds of thousands of people) in order to "Get it over quick."
- A group of eight Democrat senators led by Bernie Sanders, Jeff Merkley, and Chris Van Hollen issued an official letter to President Joe Biden, calling on him to "enforce federal law" by requiring Israel's Prime Minister Benjamin Netanyahu "to stop restricting humanitarian aid access to Gaza or forfeit U.S. military aid to Israel" as "The severe humanitarian catastrophe unfolding in Gaza is nearly unprecedented in modern history" and "The United States should not provide military assistance to any country that interferes with U.S. humanitarian assistance." They cited the 1961 Foreign Assistance Act, which states that "no assistance" shall be provided under that law or the Arms Export Control Act to any country that restricts, directly or indirectly, the transport or delivery of U.S. humanitarian assistance. "Stopping American humanitarian aid is in violation of the law. That should be clear. No more money to Netanyahu's war machine to kill Palestinian children," Sanders said.

==== April reactions ====
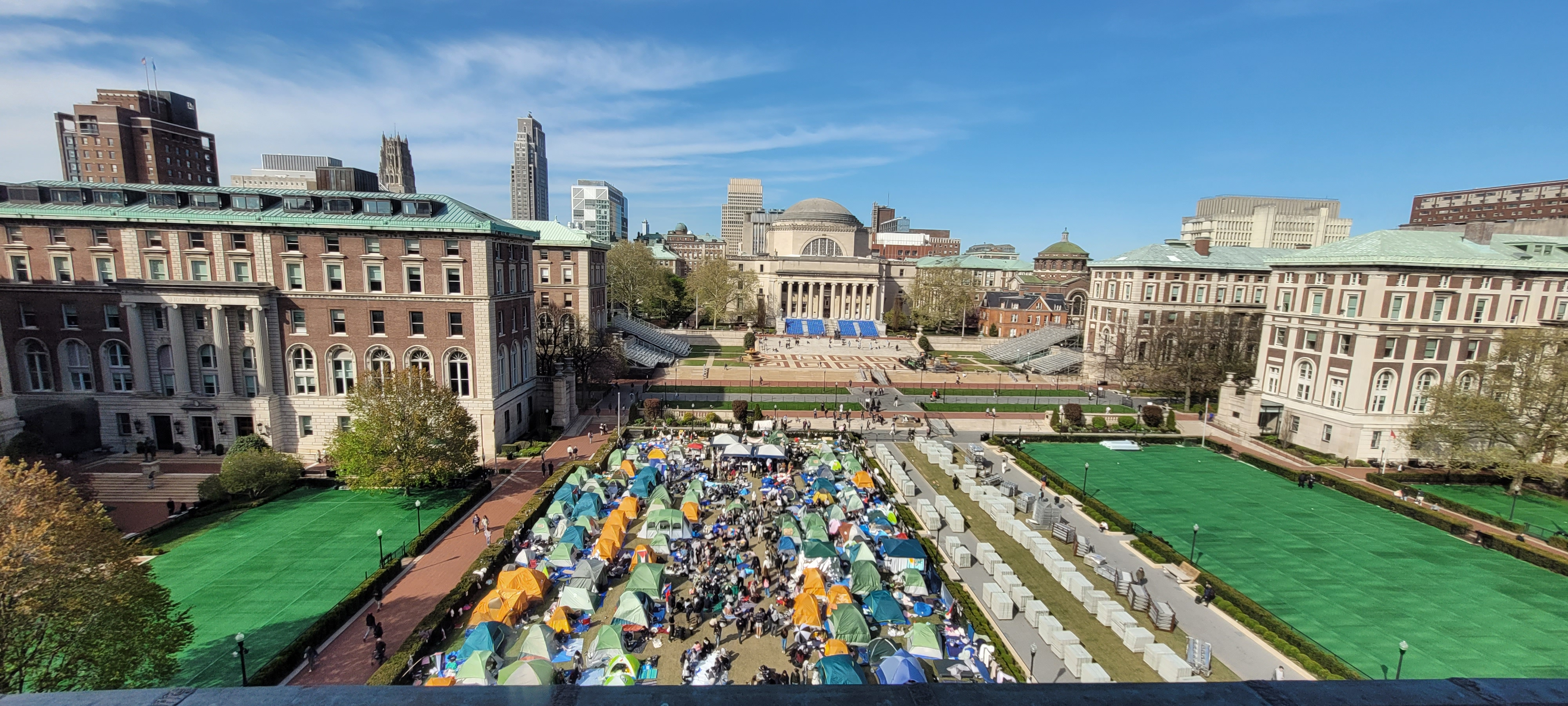
Gaza Solidarity Encampment at Columbia University on 23 April 2024

- New York City Mayor Eric Adams opposed a ceasefire in Gaza.
- Twenty-eight of the 61 nominated authors withdrew their books from consideration in the annual PEN America Awards ceremony as they condemned America's Pen for failing to strongly condemn what they called the genocide in Palestine.
- Student protesters called on Columbia University to financially divest from any company with business ties to the Israeli government, including Microsoft, Google and Amazon.
- Portland State University decided to temporarily suspend donations from Boeing following student protests.

==== May reactions–present ====
- On 22 May 2024, William Lawrence, an international relations professor at American University, stated, "From a Palestinian perspective, it's absolutely clear the US is doing next to nothing to save them from the onslaught of the Israeli forces".
- In June 2024, Marwan Bishara, the senior analyst at Al Jazeera English, stated it was "surrealistic" to hear the U.S. Secretary of State describe conditions in Gaza as if people there "were not killed by American ammunition, as if the United States did not block every attempt at an immediate and permanent ceasefire in the past three months".
- Chicago Mayor Brandon Johnson described Israel's actions in Gaza as "genocidal".
- In an op-ed in Vanity Fair, Ta-Nehisi Coates criticized the Democratic Party's continued support of Israel's actions in Gaza, writing, "The most destructive bombs that have actualized this rhetoric of extermination are being furnished by America, and more specifically, by the head of the Democratic Party."
- In September 2024, Sarah Leah Whitson argued in Foreign Policy that US non-compliance with Israel-related orders of the International Court of Justice and US attacks on the International Criminal Court, after its chief investigator's application for arrest warrants for Netanyahu and Gallant, was undermining international law globally, by modeling and legitimizing a pick-and-choose approach to compliance.
- After Trump announced his intention to occupy Gaza, in a poll conducted on 12 February 2025, only a quarter of respondents supported the prospect of sending American troops to the region.
- In a March 2025 op-ed in Newsweek calling for an arms embargo on Israel, US Representative Bonnie Watson Coleman (D) wrote that the US is not "merely witnessing a genocide in Gaza" but is complicit.
- According to a July 2025 Gallup poll, Americans' approval of Israel's military action in Gaza has fallen by 10 percentage points since the previous measurement in September, now standing at 32 percent.
- A day after UN Secretary-General António Guterres described the famine in the Gaza as a "failure of humanity," Georgia's far-right Republican Marjorie Taylor Greene joined Bernie Sanders in condemning Trump. She had previously described the Gaza humanitarian crisis as a genocide.
- On 22 July 2025, in response to a tweet by ABC News about the rising numbers of Palestinians dying of starvation, US Representative Randy Fine (R) said: "Release the hostages. Until then, starve away." He also called the reports of starvation "Muslim terror propaganda".
- On 26 August 2025, former U.S. Ambassador to Israel Jack Lew justified Israel's killing of children during the Gaza war, saying that "in many cases, the children were children of Hamas fighters, not children taking cover in places" and therefore "whether or not it was a legitimate military target flows from the population that's there".
- A Quinnipiac University poll in August 2025 found that 60 percent of respondents oppose more military support for Israel, the highest number since the 7 October attacks.
- Human Rights Watch announced in August 2025 that US military personnel who assist Israeli forces in committing war crimes may be prosecuted for their actions.
- In August 2025 President Donald Trump said that no genocide is taking place.
- Microsoft vice president and president Brad Smith confirmed that the company has canceled some of the services it provides to the Israeli military over concerns that the Israeli military is violating its terms of service by using the company's cloud computing software to spy on millions of Palestinians.
- In September 2025 the US senators Chris Van Hollen and Jeff Merkley (D) said that Israel was operating under a systematic plan to destroy and ethnically cleanse Palestinians from Gaza and that the United States was complicit in that plan.

=== Outside the U.S. ===
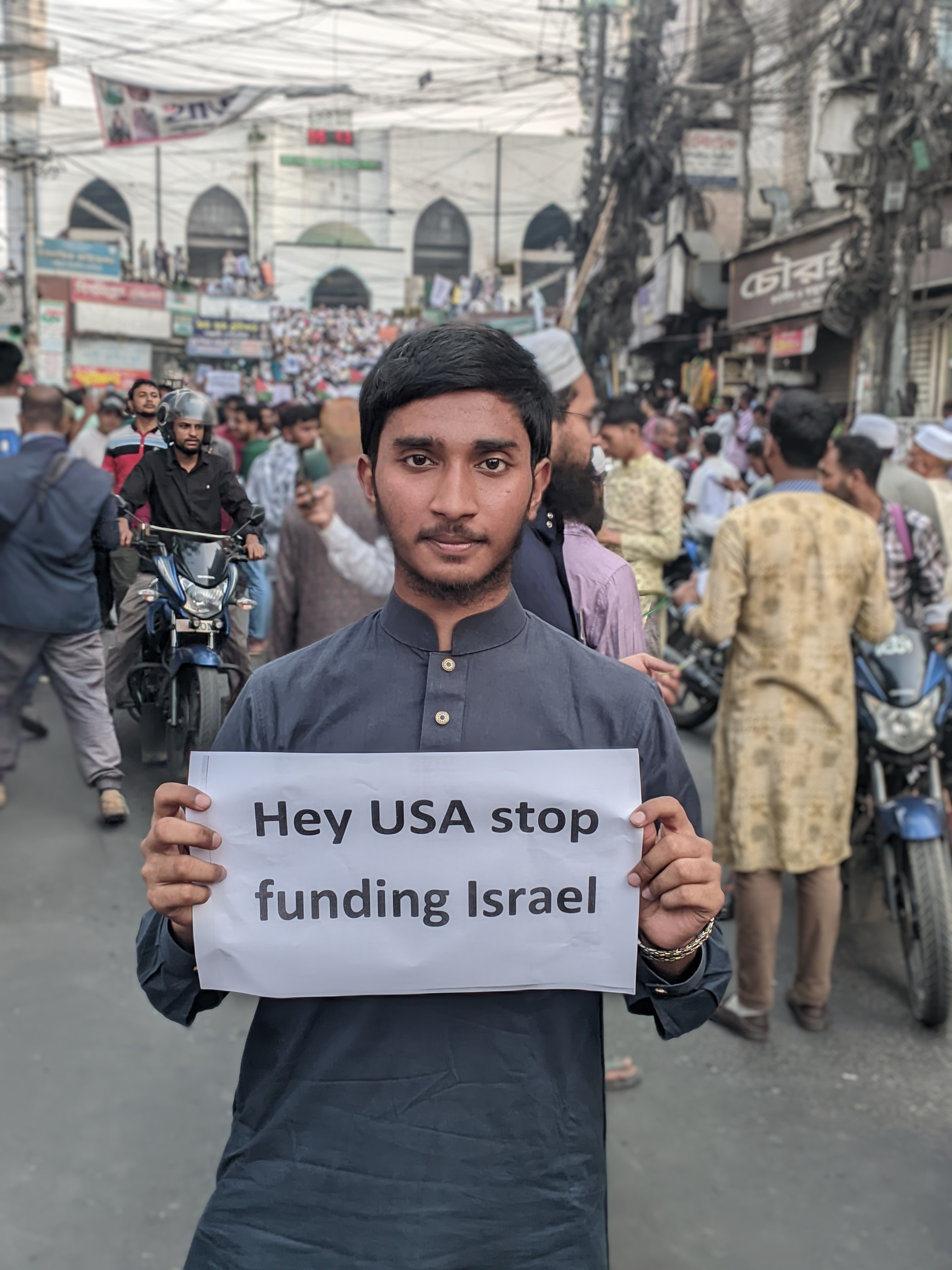
A protester holds a placard reading "Hey USA stop funding Israel" in Chittagong, Bangladesh, 7 April 2025.

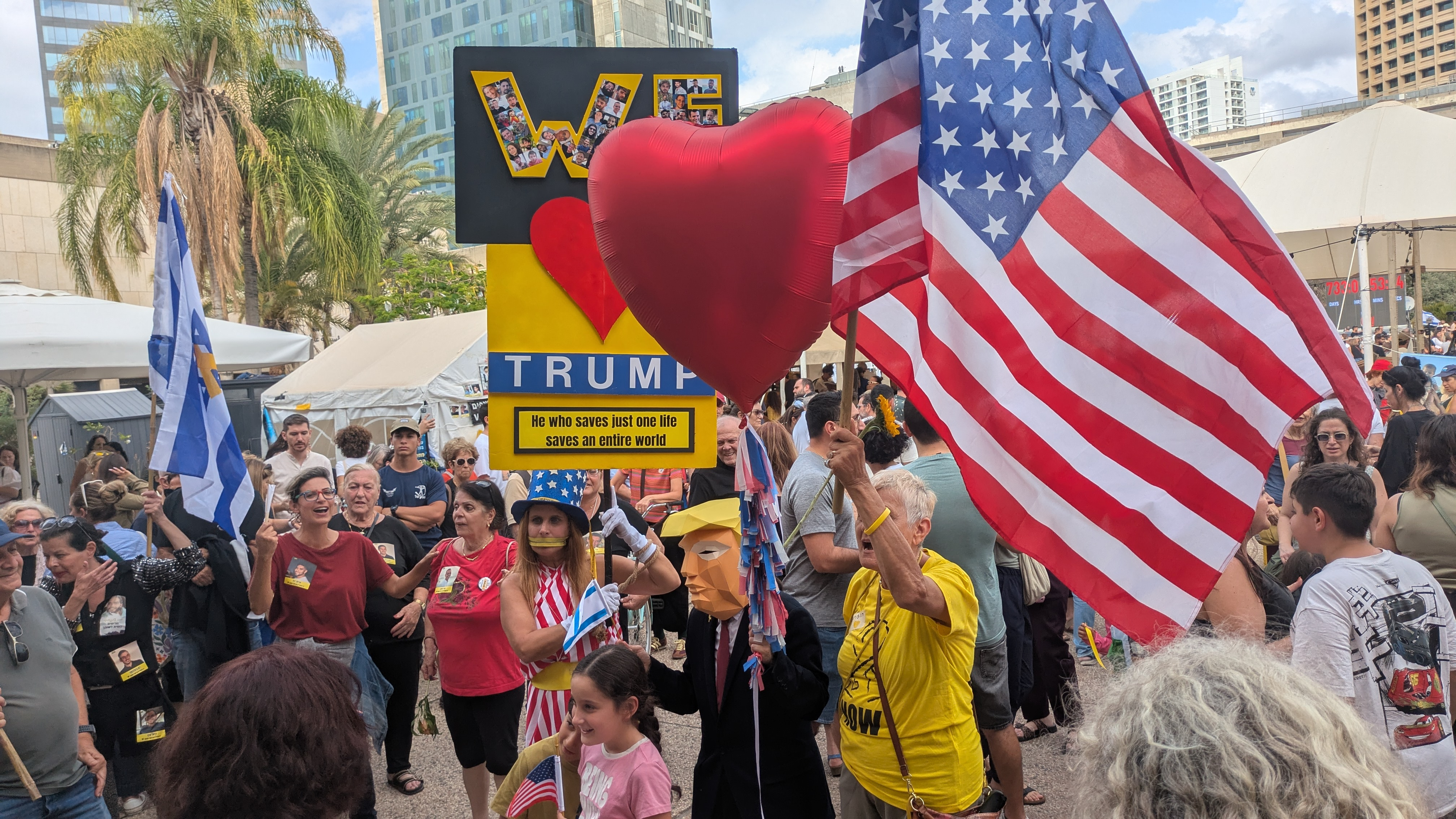
Hostages Square in Tel Aviv, 9 October 2025, following the announcement of the impending release of Israeli hostages

- Iranian officials claimed on 30 October that attacks against U.S. forces in Iraq and other parts of the region were the consequence of "wrong American policies," which included Washington's backing of Israel in its war against Hamas.
- Abdul-Malik al-Houthi, the commander of the Houthi movement in Yemen, declared on 10 October that his organization would retaliate by using missiles and drones in addition to other military measures if the United States got involved in the Gaza conflict.
- According to Agnès Callamard, Secretary-General of Amnesty International, in the face of a staggering death toll, the US vetoing another UN Security Council ceasefire resolution "displays a callous disregard for civilian suffering". In addition, Washington "has brazenly wielded and weaponized its veto to strongarm the UN Security Council, further undermining its credibility and ability to live up to its mandate to maintain international peace and security," according to the statement.
  - In February 2024, Callamard responded to the U.S. vetoing another ceasefire resolution at the UN Security Council stating, "When the US could do the right thing: protect Palestinians against serious risks of genocide; respect international law and universality; prevent massive killings and sufferings – it chose the opposite path".
- The executive director of Doctors Without Borders, Avril Benoit, states: "By vetoing this resolution, the US stands alone in casting its vote against humanity. The US veto stands in sharp contrast to the values it professes to uphold. By continuing to provide diplomatic cover for the ongoing atrocities in Gaza, the US is signaling that international humanitarian law can be applied selectively — and that the lives of some people matter less than the lives of others …. The US veto makes it complicit in the carnage in Gaza."
- International rights groups said in a statement:"By continuing to provide military and diplomatic support to Israel as it commits atrocities, including the collective punishment of Palestinian civilians in Gaza, the US is complicit in war crimes."
- In response to Biden stating Israel's actions were "over the top," the EU foreign policy chief Josep Borrell stated, "If you believe that too many people are being killed, maybe you should provide less arms in order to prevent so many people being killed."
- A Pew Research poll showed that most foreign countries disapproved of Biden's response to Israel's war in Gaza.
- The State Council Information Office of China released a report dating back to 2024, stating that the United States is "an accomplice to the genocide in Gaza" and criticised the "excessive use of unilateral sanctions".

== Analysis ==
U.S. lawmakers have long viewed Israel as an ally to help protect U.S. strategic interests in the Middle East. Maintaining Israel's regional military hegemony, according to Al-Jazeera, is a central element of U.S. Middle East policy. This has been achieved with U.S. financial aid and an increase in Israel's military arsenal. On the question of why Joe Biden is reluctant to freeze arms transfers or impose conditions on future supplies, Guardian journalist, Robert Tait writes that the US is concerned that pressure on Benjamin Netanyahu could push him towards a common goal with Republicans in a year leading to the election. Josh Paul, who resigned over sending arms to Israel, has described Biden policy in favor of "the status quo of the occupation" and a "shortsighted, destructive, unjust" policy that "will only lead to more and deeper suffering for both the Israeli and the Palestinian people — and is not in the long term American interest."

Although the U.S. has asked Israel to protect civilians and allow humanitarian aid, State Secretary Antony Blinken acknowledged that there is "a gap" between these appeals and "the actual results that we're seeing on the ground". The United States has not used its leverage over Israel—its weapons transfers and diplomatic support—to ensure civilian safety, leading the Washington Post to describe American rhetoric as a "good cop-bad cop approach". Aaron David Miller of the CEIP said that the Biden administration deserved credit for the humanitarian pause negotiations, but that it had "tethered" itself to Israeli war aims that cannot be achieved without bringing "grievous harm to the civilian population".

Ali Harb described the contradictions between media reports about Biden's "frustration" with Netanyahu, and his continued military support for Israel, stating, "The US keeps calling for minimising civilian casualties, but the Palestinian death toll keeps growing. The Biden administration repeatedly emphasises the two-state solution; Israeli leaders continue to explicitly say they oppose the establishment of a Palestinian state." In March 2024, Al Jazeera English senior analyst Marwan Bishara assessed a perceived shift in Biden's tone toward the war, stating, "Biden is underlining a change of tone, not a change of policy. And that explains a bit why he sounds as if he's speaking from both sides of his mouth."

In late-March 2024, Tamer Qarmout, a professor at the Doha Institute for Graduate Studies, stated, "You don't see the US using its real leverage to stop Israel or correct its behaviours." While Republican support for Israel remains strong, many Democrats are debating making future U.S. military aid conditional on Israel's behavior in the West Bank and Gaza. According to Steven A. Cook, for the United States, a more normal bilateral relationship with Israel is likely to reduce the moral costs of military aid. In an op-ed, Elias Khoury argued that the United States's support of Israel "has eroded its international authority and claim to uphold the international rules-based system".

Amidst criticism that Biden's blanket support for Israel's actions had weakened the supposed rules-based order, Lara Friedman of the Foundation for Middle East Peace, wrote, "The costs of these new rules of war will be paid with the blood of civilians worldwide for generations to come, and the U.S. responsibility for enabling, defending, and normalizing these new rules, and their horrific, dehumanizing consequences will not be forgotten."

Senator Bernie Sanders attributed Washington's reluctance to alter its stance on backing Israel to the financial influence of lobbying groups. "If you speak up on that issue, you'll have super Pacs like Aipac going after you," Sanders said.

=== U.S. isolation ===
U.S. President Donald Trump with Israeli Prime Minister Benjamin Netanyahu in the Oval Office, 28 July 2026

Israel and the United States have become increasingly isolated amid growing global calls for a ceasefire. American political scientist Ian Bremmer stated that the Biden administration's position unconditionally supporting the Israeli invasion of Gaza has left Joe Biden as isolated on the world stage as Russian president Vladimir Putin has been since the Russian invasion of Ukraine began in 2022. Jeffrey Sachs, a professor of economics at Columbia University, also stated that the United States was being isolated on the world stage due to its support for Israel. In March 2024, U.S. senator Bernie Sanders wrote the U.S. was "virtually alone in the world" in continuing to defend Israel's actions as the Palestinian death toll has sparked widespread outrage and protests.

=== Peace process ===
According to some analyses, the US-led ceasefire talks are simply buying more time for Israel's war in Gaza to continue. Following US request to Qatar to expel Hamas from the country, according to the BBC, this is the result of the Biden administration's less influence over Israel, which led them to believe that the best way to force some sort of deal was by putting pressure on Hamas. Writing in Le Monde Diplomatique, Adam Shatz said that Israel had taken advantage of the United States' facilitation of a peace process to assassinate Ismail Haniyeh and Hasan Nasrallah, writing that "Netanyahu helped the Americans to draft a ceasefire proposal he had no intention of honouring, while conspiring to kill the Arab leaders with whom the ceasefire was to be reached."

== Timeline ==
=== 2023 ===
==== October ====
- Hours after the start of the Gaza war on 7 October, the United States started sending warships and warplanes into the region, prepared to give Israel whatever it needs.
  - US secretary of defense Lloyd Austin ordered the deployment of United States Navy's Carrier Strike Group 12, led by the USS Gerald R. Ford.
  - Israel asked the United States for Iron Dome interceptors, and President Joe Biden said Washington would quickly provide additional equipment and resources, including ammunition, which are going to reach Israel within days.
  - US secretary of state Antony Blinken said Washington would provide its "full support" to Israel, with guided missile launchers and F-35 fighter jets among the equipment being sent.
- By 10 October, more ships and troops were on their way to Israel, and additional troops in the United States were being prepared to deploy if requested. One US aircraft carrier and its strike group were already in the eastern Mediterranean, and a second US carrier had left and was underway.
  - In addition, three naval warships were sent to the area. A large number of aircraft were sent to US military bases throughout the Middle East, and US special operations forces cooperated with the Israeli military in planning and intelligence.
  - As Israel prepares for a possible ground attack on Gaza, the Biden administration and prominent members of Congress are preparing an aid package from the United States with about $2 billion in additional funding to support Israel, Time reported.
- On 12 October, Secretary of State Antony Blinken reiterated America's commitment to Israel's security during a news conference with Israeli prime minister Benjamin Netanyahu.

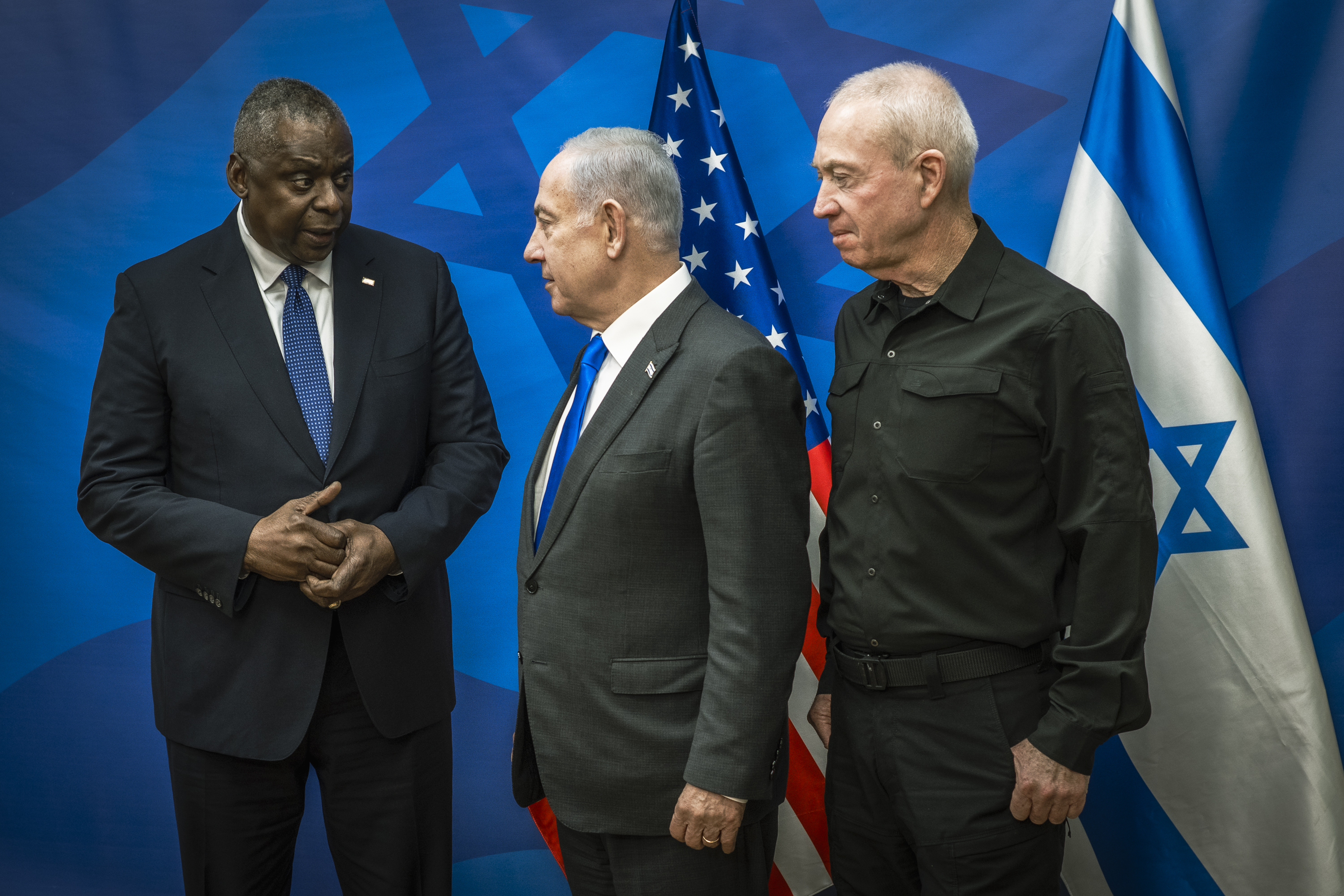
U.S. defense secretary Lloyd Austin meeting with Israeli prime minister Benjamin Netanyahu and Israeli defense minister Yoav Gallant in the city of Tel Aviv, Israel, 13 October 2023

- On 14 October, Defense Secretary Lloyd J. Austin III announced that he had dispatched a second aircraft carrier to the eastern Mediterranean "to deter hostile actions against Israel or any efforts towards widening this war". In addition, the Air Force was sending twice as many F-16, A-10, and F-15E squadrons as before to the Persian Gulf region in order to intensify its land-based assault aircraft presence there. According to officials, the United States would have an aerial armada of more than 100 attack planes when combined with the four squadrons of F/A-18 jets that were stationed onboard each carrier. Additionally, to help with intelligence gathering and preparation for any operations aimed at locating and rescuing the 150 hostages—among them some Americans—that Hamas is keeping, the Pentagon had dispatched a small team of Special Operations personnel to Israel.
- On 15 October, the White House declared that it would attempt this week to get congressional approval of a fresh $2 billion weaponry aid package for Israel and Ukraine.
  - Also US defense secretary Lloyd Austin ordered about 2,000 troops to be prepared for possible deployment to Israel, several defense officials said.
  - According to three American officials and one Israeli official, the Biden administration was discussing about the possibility of using military force if Hezbollah joins the Gaza war.
  - The United States was prepared to send more forces as a deterrent to the Middle East if necessary.
- By 17 October, five shipments of American weapons and equipment had arrived in Israel. The US put 2,000 troops on high alert and extended the deployment of an aircraft carrier in the Middle East.

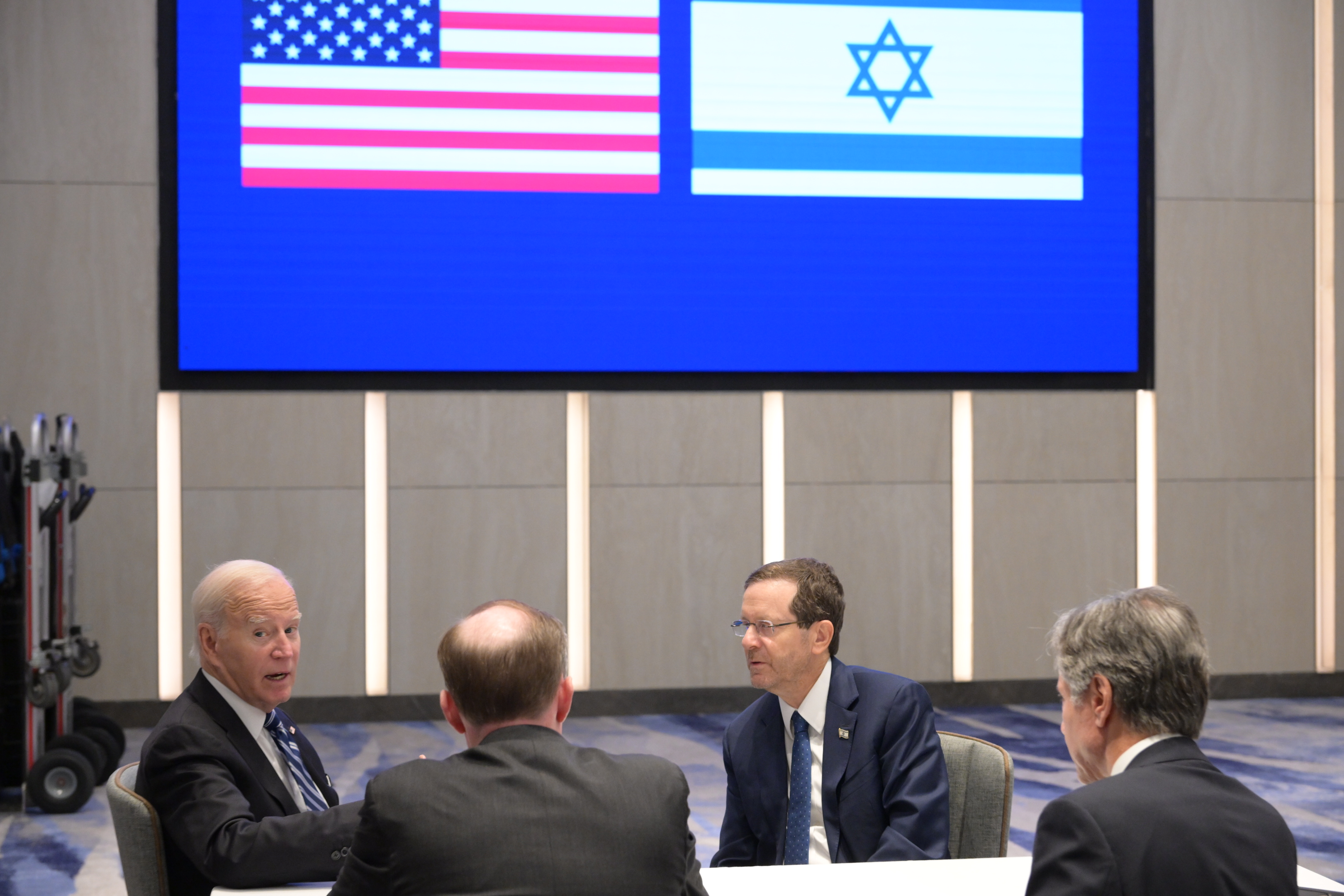
U.S. president Joe Biden, U.S. secretary of state Antony Blinken and Israeli president Isaac Herzog in Tel Aviv, Israel, 18 October 2023

- On 18 October, the US vetoed a United Nations Security Council resolution that would have condemned the Hamas attack on Israel while calling for a pause in the fighting to allow humanitarian aid into Gaza. The US said the resolution did not do enough to underscore Israel's right to self-defense. The US ambassador to the UN, Linda Thomas-Greenfield, told the council "We are on the ground doing the hard work of diplomacy. We believe we need to let that diplomacy play out".
- On 19 October, one day after traveling to Israel, President Biden urged Congress to increase military aid to Israel, claiming that Hamas aimed to "annihilate" Israeli democracy.
- On 20 October, Biden announced that the additional funds he asked Congress to authorize would come to a total of $14 billion, as part of a $105 billion military aid package that addressed Ukraine, Taiwan and Israel as well as US border security.
- On 21 October the Pentagon declared that two of its most potent missile defense systems—a THAAD battery and extra Patriot batteries—would be deployed to the Middle East.
- Craig Mokhiber of the UN High Commission for Human Rights resigned, criticising the organisation for its response to the Gaza war. He later said Israel's actions in Gaza are a "classic case of textbook genocide".

==== November ====
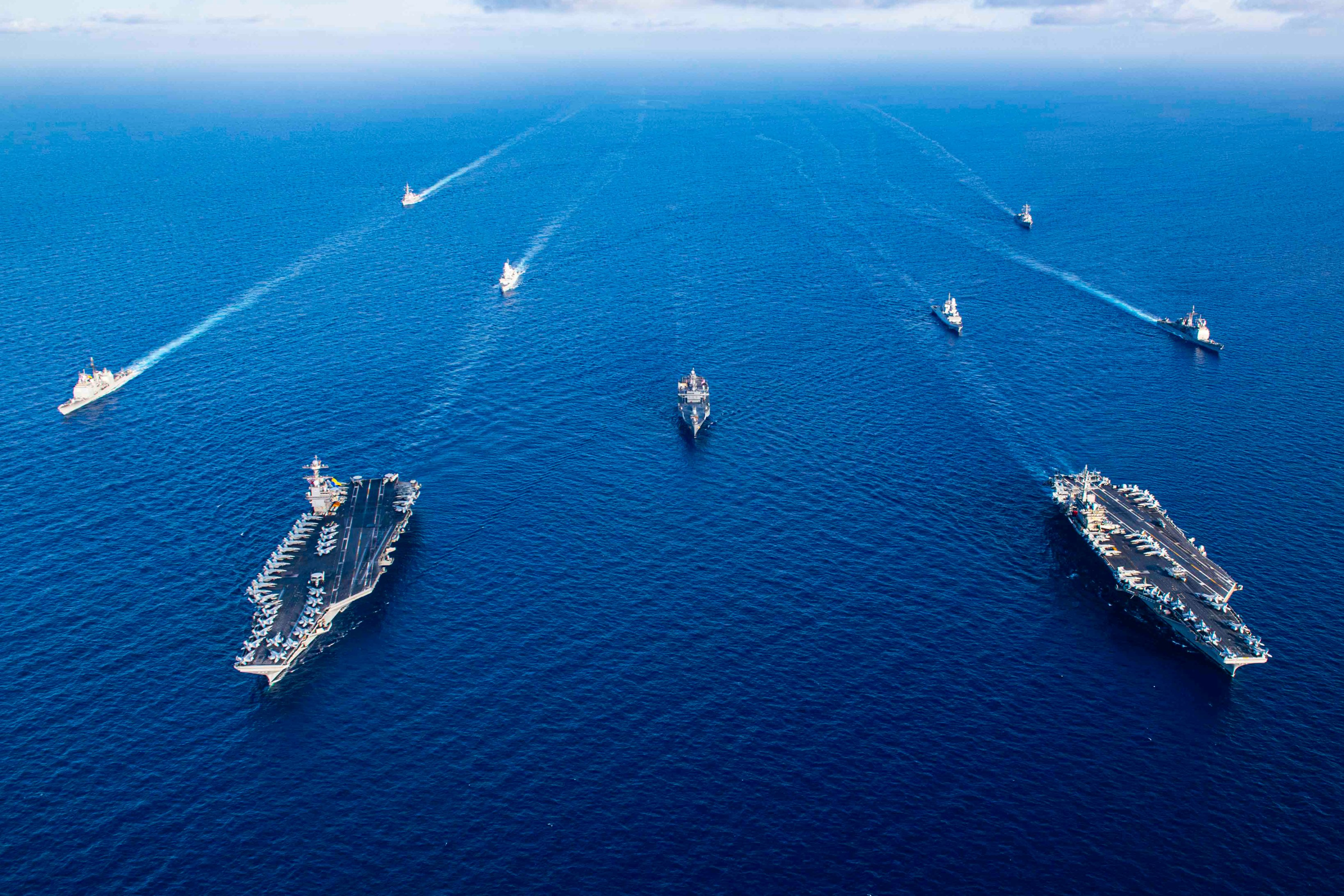
The USS Dwight D. Eisenhower and the USS Gerald R. Ford carrier strike groups in November 2023

- A Republican plan, approved by the United States House of Representatives, allocated almost $14.5 billion in military aid for Israel.

==== December ====
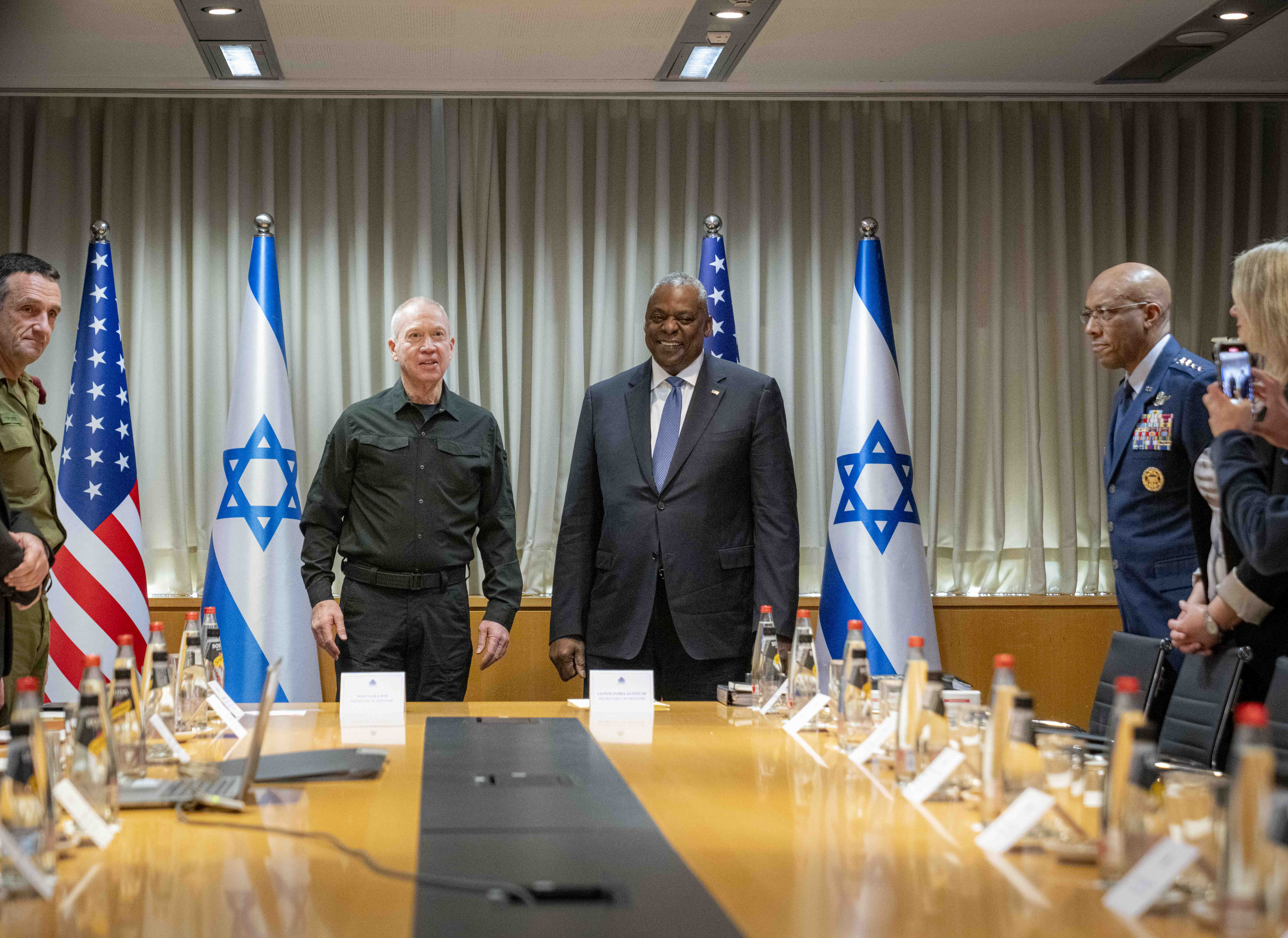
US secretary of defense Lloyd Austin, Israeli defense minister Yoav Gallant, US Joint Chiefs of Staff Chairman Charles Q. Brown Jr. and Israeli Chief of General Staff Herzi Halevi in Tel Aviv, Israel, 18 December 2023

- A Wall Street Journal report says that the United States has given Israel a range of munitions, including so-called "bunker buster" bombs, for its war in Gaza. The report stated that US arms shipments to Israel since the start of the war included 15,000 bombs and 57,000 155mm artillery shells, mostly carried on C-17 military cargo planes. U.S. has also sent more than 5,000 unguided Mk82 bombs, more than 5,400 Mk84 bombs, about 1,000 small diameter GBU-39 bombs, and almost 3,000 JDAMs. The Wall Street Journal says that some of the bloodiest Israeli attacks on the Gaza Strip have involved the use of big US-made bombs, such as the one that destroyed an apartment complex in the Jabalia refugee camp and killed over a hundred people.
- On 8 December, the US vetoed another UN Security Council resolution calling for an immediate humanitarian ceasefire. The US called it "unbalanced" because it did not condemn the Hamas attack nor acknowledge Israel's right to self-defense.
- On 9 December, the Pentagon said that on the prior day, Biden used emergency authority to skip congressional review to sell ~14,000 tank shells worth $106.5 million for immediate delivery to Israel.
- On 12 December, Biden said "Israel's security can rest on the United States" but warned that Israel was losing international support because of its "indiscriminate bombing" of Gaza.
- On 29 December, the United States government again used emergency authority to sell Israel artillery shells and related weapons worth $147.5 million in order to replenish Israeli weapons stockpiles.

=== 2024 ===
==== January ====
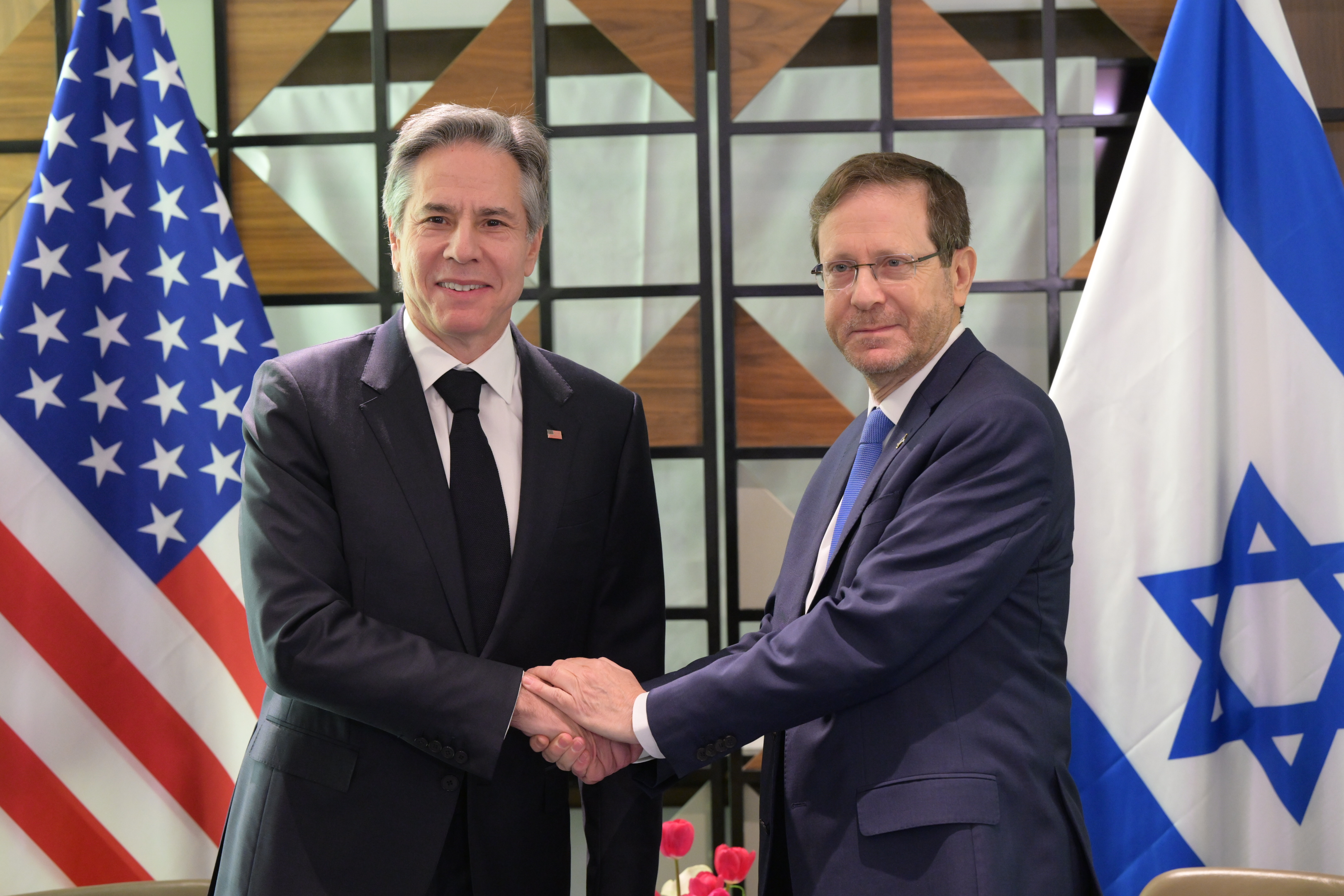
US secretary of state Antony Blinken and Israeli president Isaac Herzog in Tel Aviv, Israel, 9 January 2024

- On 4 January, John Kirby stated the United States had "not seen anything" that Israel had done that would make the US change its approach.
- On 18 January, US Department of State spokesman Matthew Miller stated, "Our support for Israel remains ironclad."
- PM Netanyahu stated that he would not support a Palestinian state and that he was proud to have thus far prevented a state, leading Biden to comment that he believed a two-state solution was still possible with Netanyahu in power.
- On 19 January, John Kirby stated, "We don't have any indications that there's deliberate efforts to commit war crimes" by Israel.
- Brett McGurk, the White House leader of post-war Gaza planning, was reportedly pushing a plan that would exchange minimal Israeli interference in the Palestinian Territories for Saudi normalization with Israel.
- The CIA established a new taskforce to provide intelligence to Israel regarding Hamas leaders.

==== February ====
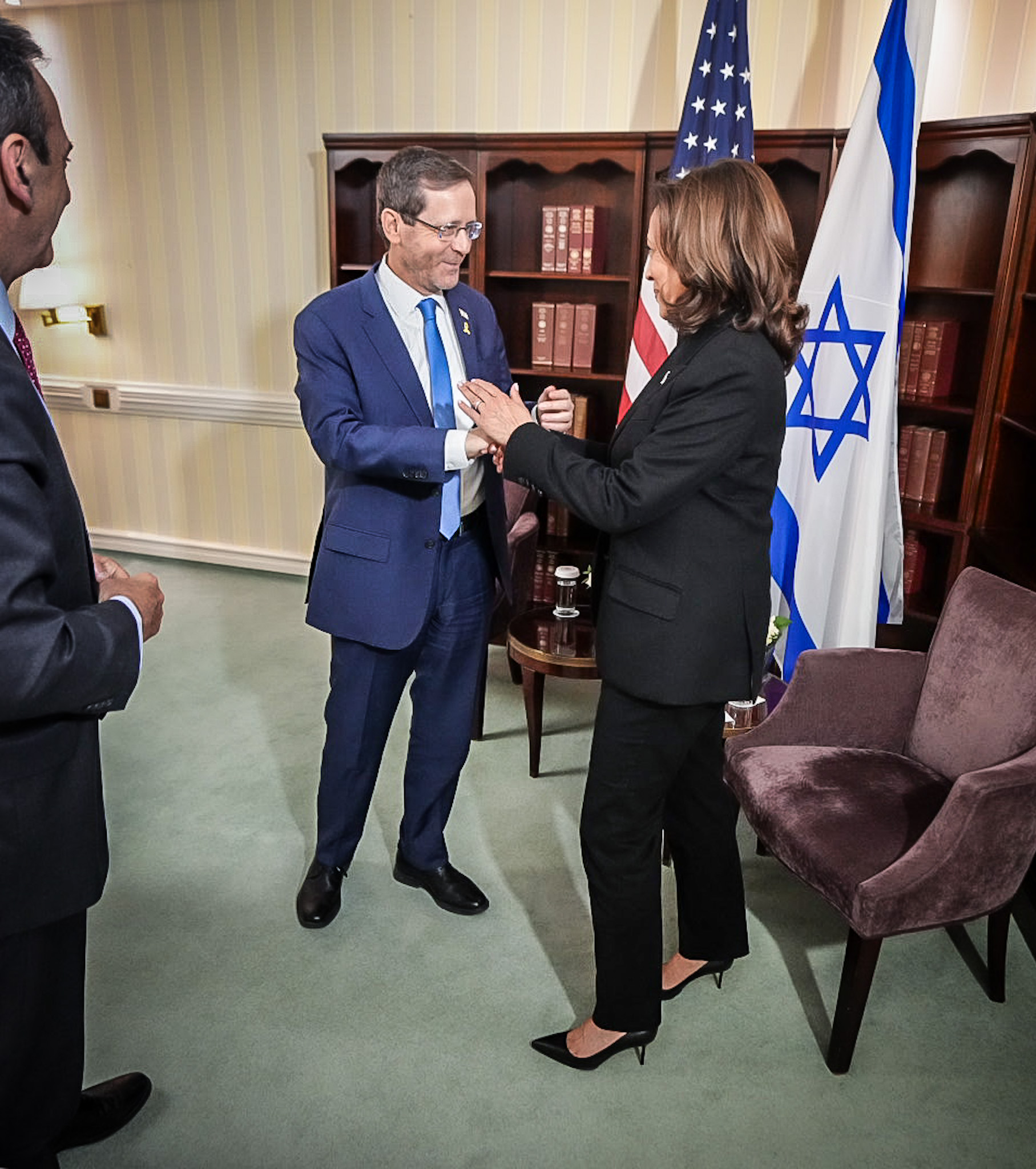
Vice President Kamala Harris with Israeli president Isaac Herzog at the 60th Munich Security Conference, 16 February 2024

- On 8 February, Biden called Israel's actions in Gaza "over the top". Following this, the Biden administration issued a national security directive demanding written assurances from Israel (and other countries) that it was using US-supplied weapons in line with international law or face a pause in weapons transfers. Israel has to prove this to the US State Department on a yearly basis or risk having its weapons supplies cut.
- In a call with Benjamin Netanyahu on 11 February, Biden said the US would not support an Israeli assault on Rafah without a "credible and executable plan" for ensuring the safety of civilians. Three anonymous U.S. officials stated that the US would not punish Israel if its forces attacked Rafah without a plan to protect civilians.
- The State Department stated it was reviewing reports of Israel harming Palestinian civilians in Gaza.
- The Senate passed a US$14 billion aid package for Israel.
- The U.S. began preparing to send Israel more weapons ahead of its planned Rafah offensive, stating, "Israel takes effective action to prevent gross violations of human rights."
- On 20 February, the US vetoed a UN Security Council resolution seeking an "immediate humanitarian ceasefire". The US envoy, Linda Thomas-Greenfield, said that the resolution would undermine ongoing hostage negotiations: "Demanding an immediate unconditional ceasefire, without an agreement requiring Hamas to release the hostages, will not bring about durable peace". Instead, the US proposed a draft UN Security Council resolution, calling for a "temporary ceasefire in Gaza as soon as practicable, based on the formula of all hostages being released". It stated that a Rafah offensive would have "serious implications" and "should not proceed under current circumstances". The US's draft resolution also rejects any Israeli attempt at demographic or territorial change in Gaza that would violate international law. The US said it would not yet put the resolution to a vote as it wanted to allow negotiations to continue.
- When asked about the deaths of Palestinian children, US Representative Andy Ogles (R) said: "I think we should kill 'em all ... Hamas and the Palestinians have been attacking Israel for 20 years. It's time to pay the piper." Supporters of Palestine, including the American Muslim Advisory Council, denounced his comments as a call for genocide.
- Aaron Bushnell immolated himself in front of the Embassy of Israel, Washington, D.C. in protest of the war.
- The Lemkin Institute for Genocide Prevention said the Biden administration was complicit in genocide in Gaza: "President Biden and key administration officials are on a path to be remembered as the principal enablers of one of the worst genocides in the 21st century." Ali Harb wrote, "US weapons have continued to flow to Israel to arm a military carrying out a suspected genocide in Gaza."
- After the US vetoed a UN ceasefire resolution, Cuban president Miguel Diaz-Canel Bermudez said, "They are accomplices of this genocide of Israel against Palestine."

==== March ====
- Following the Flour massacre, the US began airdrops of aid into Gaza. Officials stated, "Biden remains unwilling to make any major shifts in his policy toward Israel, including placing conditions on military aid to Israel".
  - Algeria proposed a motion to the UN Security Council to release a statement condemning the massacre and blaming Israel, which was blocked by the United States. The deputy US ambassador to the UN, Robert Wood, said the US was alarmed by the incident and called on Israel to investigate, but claimed "We don't have all the facts on the ground".
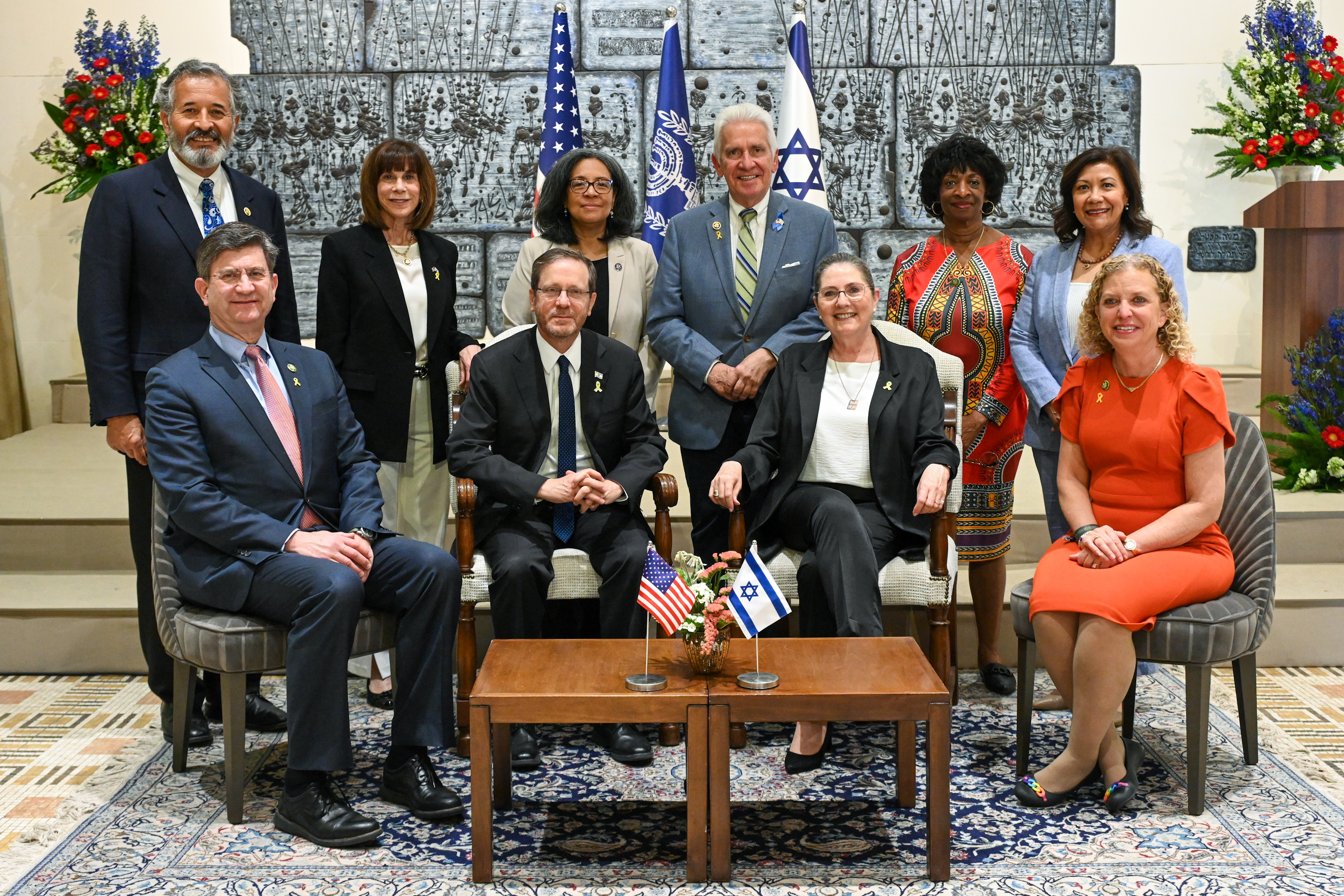
    Members of the US congressional delegation with Israeli president Isaac Herzog in Jerusalem, 28 March 2024
- Biden called on Republicans to pass his foreign aid bill to "help ensure that Israel can defend itself". He said it would also provide "critical humanitarian aid to the Palestinian people".
- On 4 March, US vice president Kamala Harris called for "an immediate ceasefire for at least the next six weeks" because of "the immense scale of suffering in Gaza". She said Israel must let more aid into Gaza and called on Hamas to accept a ceasefire deal involving the release of hostages. She added that "President Joe Biden and I are unwavering in our commitment to Israel's security". Harris was reportedly urging Biden to speak more about the high death toll and plight of survivors in Gaza.
- UN Ambassador Linda Thomas-Greenfield stated, "Not nearly enough humanitarian aid is getting into the hands of Palestinians".
- U.S. officials told Congress they had approved more than 100 arms sales to Israel since 7 October.
- Some of Biden's closest allies in the U.S. Senate — including Chris Coons, Jack Reed, Tim Kaine, and Patty Murray — were reportedly pressuring Biden to change his tactics in Gaza. Senator Bernie Sanders, along with seven other U.S. senators, warned Biden that arming Israel was a violation of the Foreign Assistance Act, which bars the U.S. from arming countries that limit humanitarian aid.
- An intelligence report found that Israel was likely to experience armed resistance from Hamas "for years to come" and that Netanyahu's viability as leader "may be in jeopardy".
- In a speech on 14 March, the Democratic US Senate majority leader, Chuck Schumer, berated Israeli PM Netanyahu as an "obstacle to peace". He said that Netanyahu "has been too willing to tolerate the civilian toll in Gaza" and that "Israel cannot survive if it becomes a pariah". Schumer added that if Netanyahu stayed in power after the war, "the United States will have no choice but to play a more active role in shaping Israeli policy by using our leverage to change the present course". President Biden praised the speech and said Schumer's "serious concerns" are shared by many Americans.
- A group of 19 Senate Democrats sent an open letter to Biden, stating, "We request the Biden administration promptly establish a bold, public framework outlining the steps necessary" to create a Palestinian state.
- Jack Lew, Joseph R. Biden's ambassador to Israel, endorsed Israel's claim that it was abiding by international law during its war on Gaza.
- Reuters reported congressional leaders and the White House had reached a deal to bar funding for UNRWA, the organization principally responsible for delivering food and providing education in Gaza, until March 2025.
  - Upon the bill's passage, Democratic U.S. Senator Chris Van Hollen stated, "Denying funding for UNRWA is tantamount to denying food to starving people and restricting medical supplies to injured civilians".
  - The bill included a long-standing provision that limits aid to the Palestinian Authority if "the Palestinians initiate an International Criminal Court (ICC) judicially authorized investigation, or actively supports such an investigation, that subjects Israeli nationals to an investigation for alleged crimes against Palestinians."
- John Barrasso stated that in a meeting with Netanyahu, senate Republicans told him that "Israel has every right to defend themselves".
- The US put forward a draft UN Security Council resolution which stated the "imperative" for "an immediate and sustained ceasefire", facilitating aid delivery and supporting ongoing talks between Israel and Hamas, linked to the release of hostages. On 22 March, the draft resolution was vetoed by Russia and China, who said the wording was ambiguous and was not a straightforward "call" or "demand" to halt hostilities.
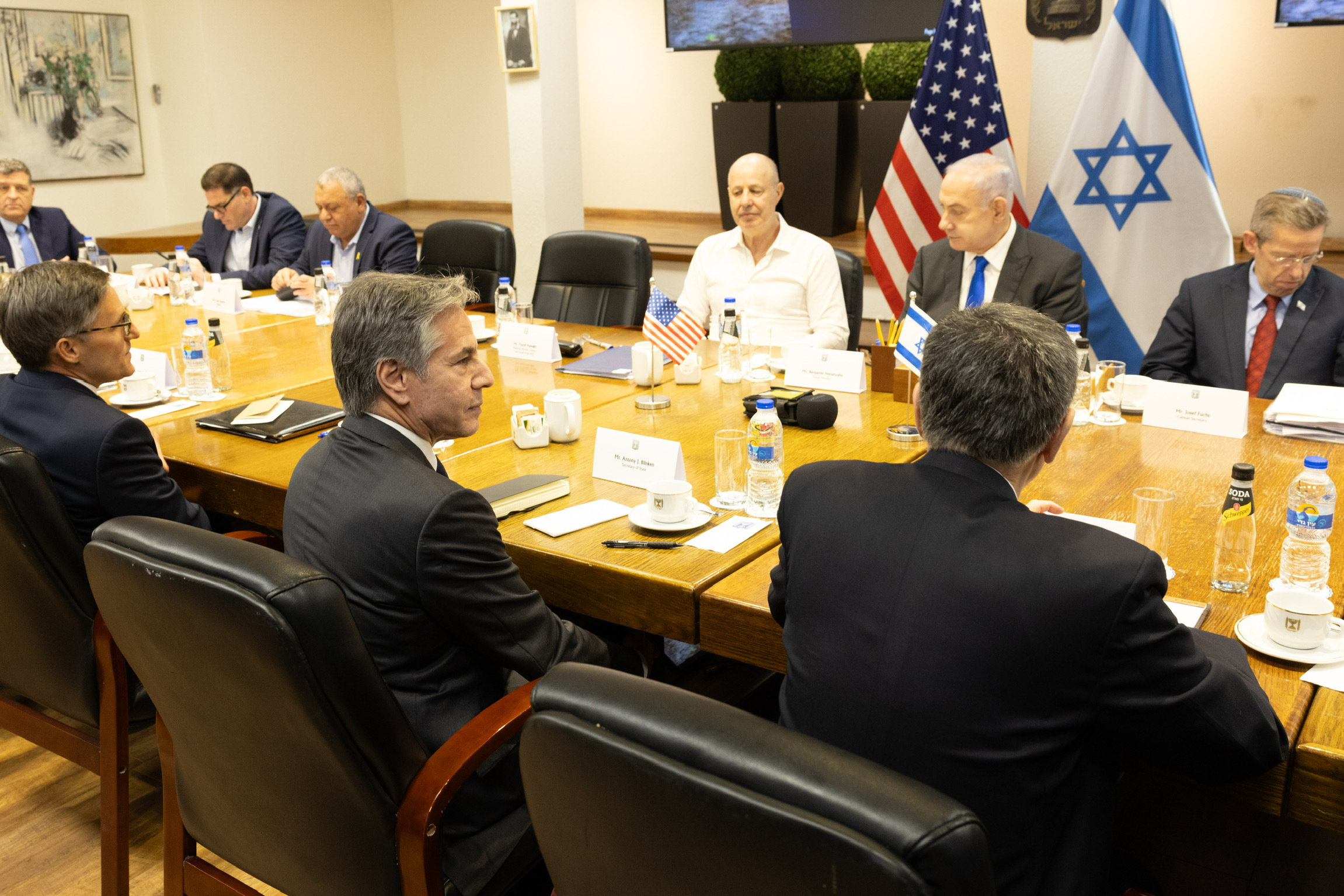
  US secretary of state Antony Blinken with Israeli prime minister Benjamin Netanyahu and the Israeli war cabinet in Tel Aviv, Israel, 22 March 2024

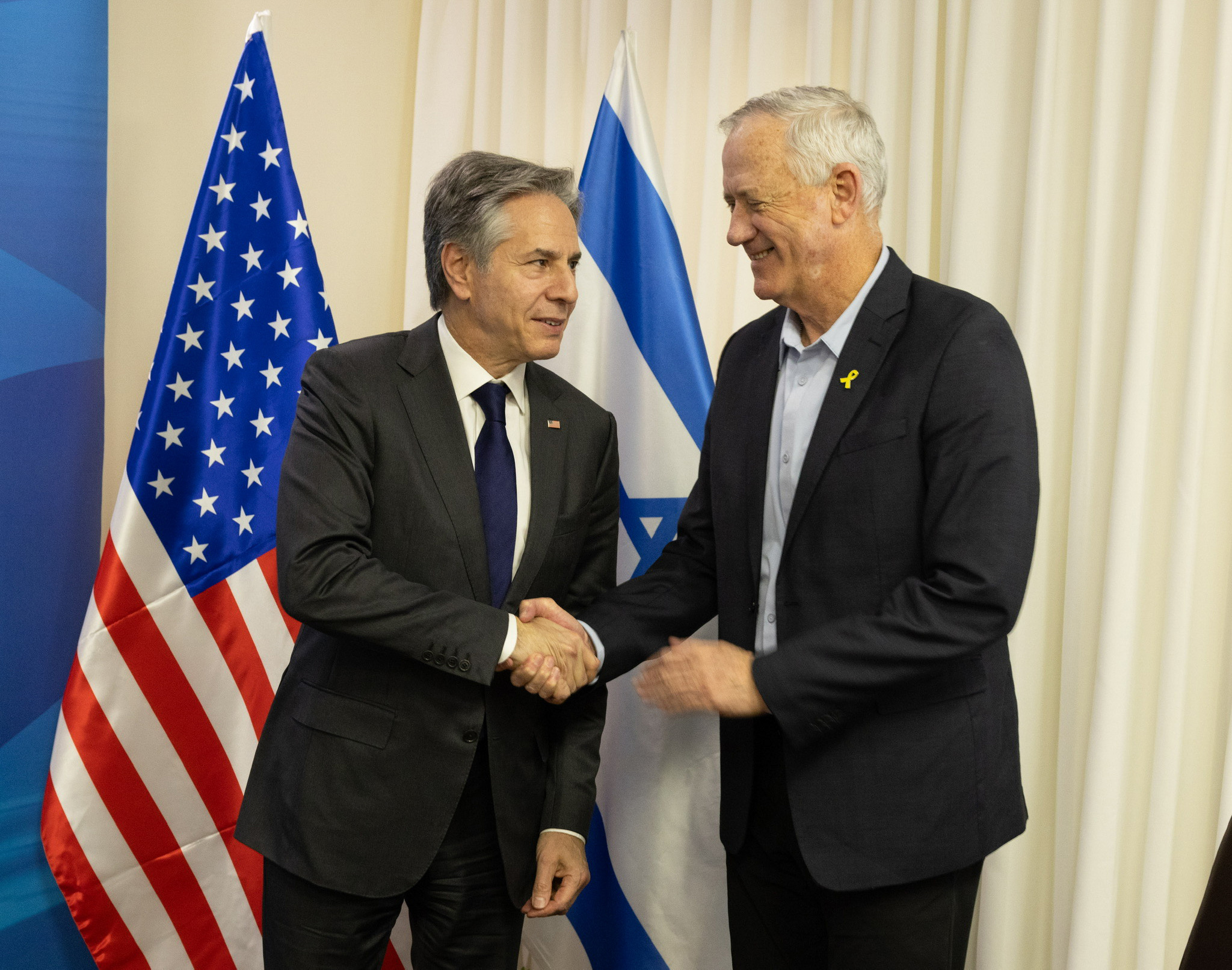
US secretary of state Antony Blinken and Benny Gantz in Tel Aviv, 22 March 2024

- On 22 March, U.S. Secretary of State Antony Blinken said he told the Israeli government that "A major military ground operation [in Rafah] is not the way to do it. It risks killing many more civilians, it risks wreaking greater havoc on the provision of humanitarian assistance, it risks further isolation of Israel around the world and jeopardizing its long-term security and standing". He added "We're looking forward to seeing Israeli officials in Washington next week to go through the details and the best way forward. We're determined that Israel succeed in defending itself".
- On 23 March, the US Defense Ministry said a planned visit by the Israeli Defense Minister to the U.S. would focus on "the progress of the fighting to dismantle Hamas in the Gaza Strip, the efforts to return the hostages held captive by Hamas, the actions being taken on the ground to bring in humanitarian aid", as well as on weapons procurement "to preserve the qualitative advantage of the State of Israel in the region".
- On 24 March, Vice president Kamala Harris replied, "I am ruling out nothing," when asked if there would be consequences for Israel if it invaded Rafah.
- A group of 17 Democratic senators urged the Biden administration to reject Israel's report stating that it was complying with international human rights law in Gaza. The following day, the U.S. Department of State accepted Israel's statements regarding its compliance.
- On 25 March, the UN Security Council passed a resolution demanding an immediate ceasefire for the remainder of Ramadan, "leading to a lasting sustainable ceasefire", and demanding the immediate and unconditional release of all hostages. The US abstained, allowing the resolution to pass. The Israeli government berated the US for not voting against the resolution, and called off a meeting between an Israeli delegation and US officials in Washington.
- The U.S. House introduced a bill to reevaluate the U.S. relationship with South Africa.
- On 30 March, the White House authorized $2.5 billion in weapons transfers to Israel.
- Republican congressman Tim Walberg suggested dropping a nuclear bomb on Gaza to "get it over quick".
- Donald Trump said that Biden "dumped Israel" due to being overly influenced by pro-Palestinian protests, that he supported Israel's ongoing offensive in Gaza, that Israel had to "finish the problem", and that the Biden administration "got soft", which some commentators viewed as a call to continue and "double down" on genocidal acts. Trump's campaign also said that, if elected, he would bar Gaza residents from entering the US.

==== April ====
- In response to a question asking whether additional weapons transfers to Israel would weaken U.S. credibility, a State Department spokesman stated, "We are committed to Israel's right to self-defence, and this is a long-term commitment the United States has made."
- Following the World Central Kitchen drone strikes, a senior U.S. official told Politico, "It's just rinse and repeat with the Israelis. The American political system can't or won't draw a real line with them and that is regrettable."
- U.S. senator Chris Coons stated, "If Benjamin Netanyahu were to order the IDF into Rafah at scale... and make no provision for civilians or for humanitarian aid, I would vote to condition aid to Israel".
- Former Speaker of the House Nancy Pelosi signed a letter urging Biden to stop sending arms to Israel.
- On 9 April, U.S. defense secretary Lloyd Austin told the Senate Armed Services Committee that the Pentagon had no evidence that Israel was carrying out a genocide against Palestinians in the Gaza Strip. He said there was "no question" that there had been "far too many" civilian casualties in the war in Gaza.
- A report by ProPublica found that U.S. secretary of state Antony Blinken had failed to take action on State Department recommendations that units in the Israeli army be sanctioned due to their involvement with rapes and killings.
- A U.S. State Department report described "allegations of numerous incidents such as arbitrary or unlawful killings, enforced disappearance, torture and unjustified arrests of journalists".
- Biden signed a $95 billion security package, which included around $26 billion in military aid for Israel and $1 billion in humanitarian aid for Gaza.
- On 24 April, twelve Republicans in the U.S. Senate; Tom Cotton, Marco Rubio, Ted Cruz, Mitch McConnell, Marsha Blackburn, Katie Boyd Britt, Ted Budd, Kevin Cramer, Bill Hagerty, Pete Ricketts, Rick Scott, and Tim Scott, sent a letter to the International Criminal Court's chief prosecutor, Karim Ahmad Khan, that warned him that any attempt by the ICC to pursue charges against Israeli officials over war crimes committed in the Gaza Strip will be interpreted "not only as a threat to Israel's sovereignty but to the sovereignty of the United States". The senators told Khan, "Target Israel and we will target you ... [and] sanction your employees and associates, and bar you and your families from the United States. ... You have been warned."
- Responding to the Republican senators, Democratic Senator Chris Van Hollen of Maryland said, "It is fine to express opposition to a possible judicial action, but it is absolutely wrong to interfere in a judicial matter by threatening judicial officers, their family members and their employees with retribution. This thuggery is something befitting the mafia, not U.S. senators."
- A joint assessment from the Bureau of Democracy, Human Rights, and Labor, the Bureau of Population, Refugees, and Migration; the Office of Global Criminal Justice and the Bureau of International Organization Affairs found that Israel is potentially violating international humanitarian law in Gaza and that Israel's claims that they are using U.S.-supplied weaponry in accordance with such laws are neither "credible or reliable".
- The U.S. Department of State found five Israeli army units responsible for "gross violations of human rights" prior to 7 October and that they remained eligible for military aid.

==== May ====
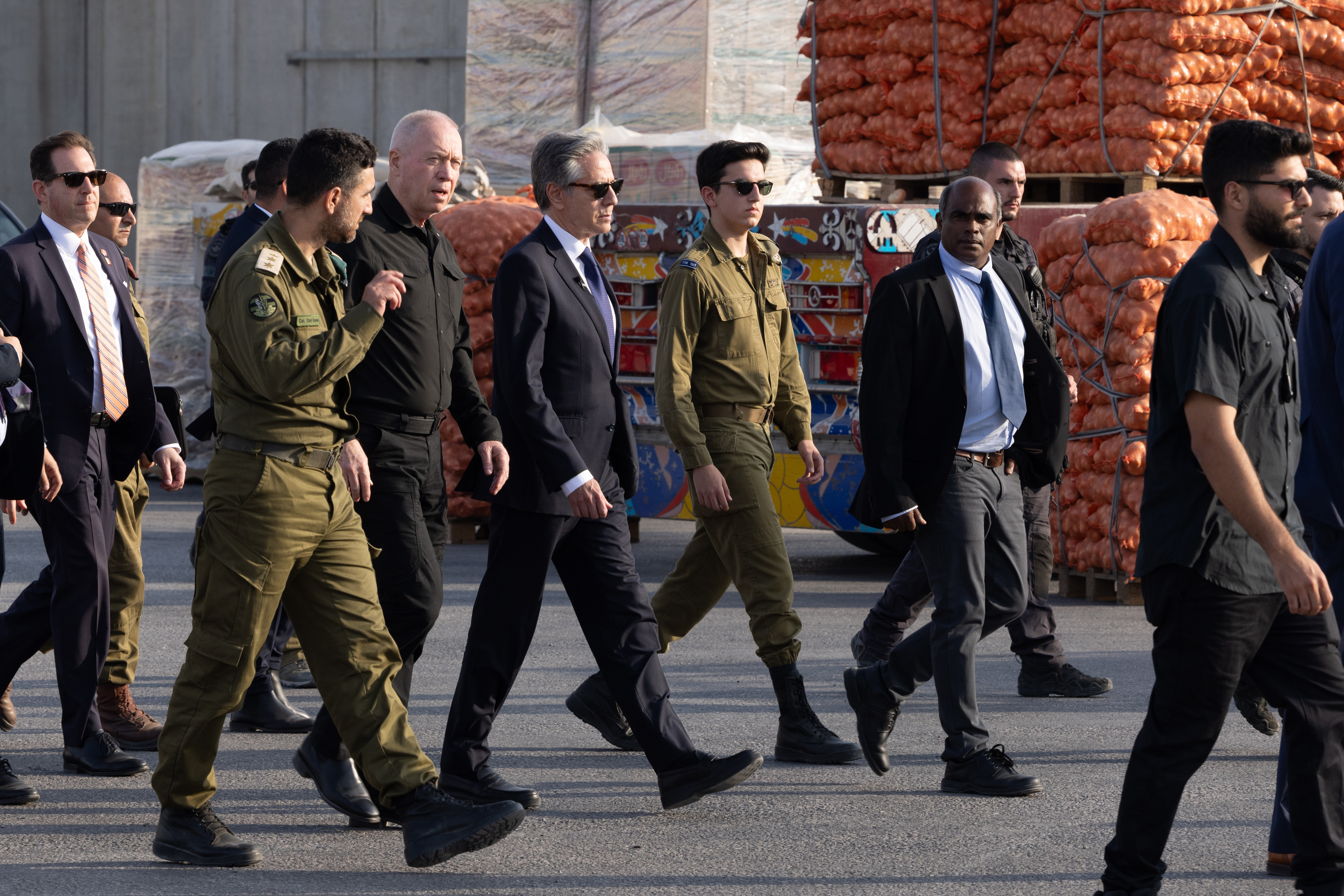
Blinken and Gallant at the Kerem Shalom border crossing in Kerem Shalom, Israel, 1 May 2024

- On 1 May 2024, U.S. senators met International Criminal Court officials online to discuss potential arrest warrants. On 3 May 2024, chief prosecutor Karim Ahmad Khan called for "all attempts to impede, intimidate, or improperly influence officials [to] cease immediately" and referred to Article 70 of the Rome Statute defining "retaliating against an official of the court on account of duties performed" as an offence.
- Tony Blinken stated the "only thing standing between the people of Gaza and a ceasefire is Hamas". Two days later, Hamas agreed to a U.S.-negotiated ceasefire, which Israel then rejected.
- A letter signed by 86 House representatives stated that Israel's restrictions on humanitarian aid called into question its assurances of compliance with the U.S. Foreign Assistance Act.
- The U.S. president stated it would halt the shipment of bombs to Israel if a "major invasion" of Rafah were launched, stating, "Civilians have been killed in Gaza as a consequence of those bombs". Less than a week later, however, Biden notified Congress about a $1 billion arms sale to Israel.
- A U.S. State Department report found Israel's use of U.S. weapons "likely" violated international law. In the same report, however, the U.S. found Israel's assurances it was following international law to be "credible". Avril Benoit, the executive director of Doctors Without Borders, stated the analysis was not a "good faith effort to uphold US law".
- On 12 May 2024, Republican presidential candidate Donald Trump stated, "(Biden) is surrendering our college campuses to anarchists, jihadist freaks and anti-american extremists who are trying to tear down our American flag. ... If you come here from another country and try to bring jihadism or anti-Americanism or anti-Semitism to our campuses, we will immediately deport you. You'll be out of that school."
- The Republican-controlled U.S. House passed legislation that would slash the U.S. military budget unless Biden sent 3,500 heavy-duty bombs to Israel. The White House said Biden would veto it if it come to his desk.
- US president Joe Biden said that the request of the prosecutor of the International Criminal Court to issue an arrest warrant against the leaders of Israel is cruel and the U.S. will always stand by Israel.
- 31 May – Biden announces an Israeli ceasefire proposal.

==== June ====
- US lawmakers have passed legislation aimed at sanctioning the International Criminal Court (ICC) over efforts by its prosecutors to issue arrest warrants for senior Israeli officials accused of war crimes in Gaza.
- The Nuseirat rescue operation was aided by intelligence support from the United States.
- Benjamin Netanyahu was invited to address a joint session of Congress, scheduled for 24 July 2024.
- The United States officially signed a Letter of Offer and Acceptance, allowing Israel to purchase 25 additional Lockheed Martin F-35 stealth fighter jets for $3 billion.
- Rep. Gregory Meeks and Sen. Ben Cardin signed off to an arms sale to Israel totaling $18 billion, after pressure from the Biden administration.
- The U.S. House passed a bill barring the U.S. State Department from using the Gaza Health Ministry's death toll statistics.

==== July ====
- U.S. vice president Kamala Harris stated that she would not preside over Netanyahu's joint session of Congress.
- The United States has resumed shipments of the 500-pound bombs, which were halted in February over concerns about the humanitarian impact of Israel's use of them in killing Palestinians in Gaza.
- Netanyahu made an address to a joint session of Congress, amidst large protests in Washington.
- Following a meeting with Netanyahu, U.S. vice president Harris stated she would "not be silent" about the suffering of Palestinians in Gaza.
- The Department of State criticized the ICJ advisory opinion on the Israeli occupation, claiming that it would make future negotiations for a Palestinian state more difficult.

==== August ====
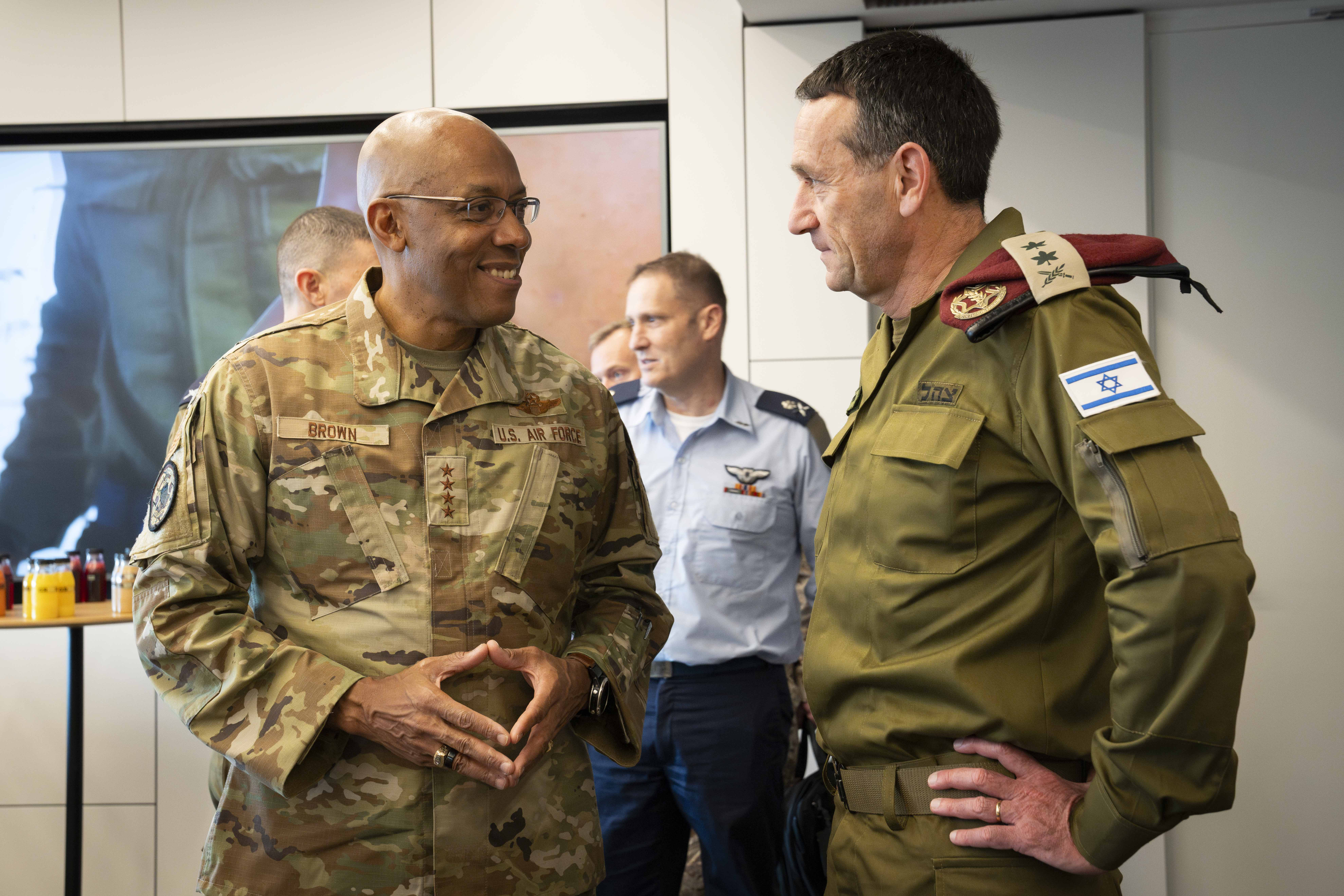
US Joint Chiefs of Staff Chairman Charles Q. Brown Jr. and Israeli Chief of General Staff Herzi Halevi in Bnei Brak, Israel, 26 August 2024

- Kamala Harris' national security advisor Philip H. Gordon said that Harris did not support an arms embargo on Israel.
- U.S. ambassador Rahm Emanuel announced he would skip the atomic bombing peace memorial in Nagasaki because of the city's decision not to invite Israel to the ceremony, along with Russia and Belarus.
- On 9 August 2024, the Department of State said the United States would send Israel an additional $3.5 billion to spend on US-made weapons and military equipment.
- On 13 August 2024, the Department of State announced that the U.S. had approved a $20 billion weapons package sale to Israel, which included fighter jets and advanced air-to-air missiles.
- The U.S. government was sued for allegedly discriminating against Palestinian American activists, including seizing personal electronic devices and placing one plaintiff on the No Fly List.
- Former president and Republican presidential nominee Donald Trump claimed that he told Benjamin Netanyahu, "It has to get over with fast... Get your victory and get it over with. It has to stop, the killing has to stop." He also made the statement, "From the start, Harris has worked to tie Israel's hand behind its back, demanding an immediate ceasefire, always demanding ceasefire," and added that it "would only give Hamas time to regroup and launch a new October 7 style attack". Trump also labelled pro-Palestinian supporters calling for an end to U.S. support for Israel's war crimes as "pro-Hamas thugs" and "jihad sympathizers". He threatened to arrest and deport them from the United States if he becomes president again.
- Following the Biden administration's decision not to sanction the Netzah Yehuda Battalion, former State Department human rights official Charles Blaha stated, "It really calls into question how much value the department gives to the lives of Palestinian-Americans."
- During the 2024 Democratic National Convention, anti-war protesters called for a ceasefire and arms embargo against Israel.

==== September–October ====
- The city council of Portland, Maine passed a resolution urging the city to divest from 80 companies which were potentially complicit in Israel's violations of international law.
- U.S. representative Rashida Tlaib submitted a list of the children killed in Gaza into the official record of the United States Congress.
- The U.S. secretary of state and Chairman of the Joints Chiefs of Staff wrote a letter to Israel threatening that weapons transfers would be affected if it didn't increase humanitarian aid into northern Gaza within 30 days.

==== November ====
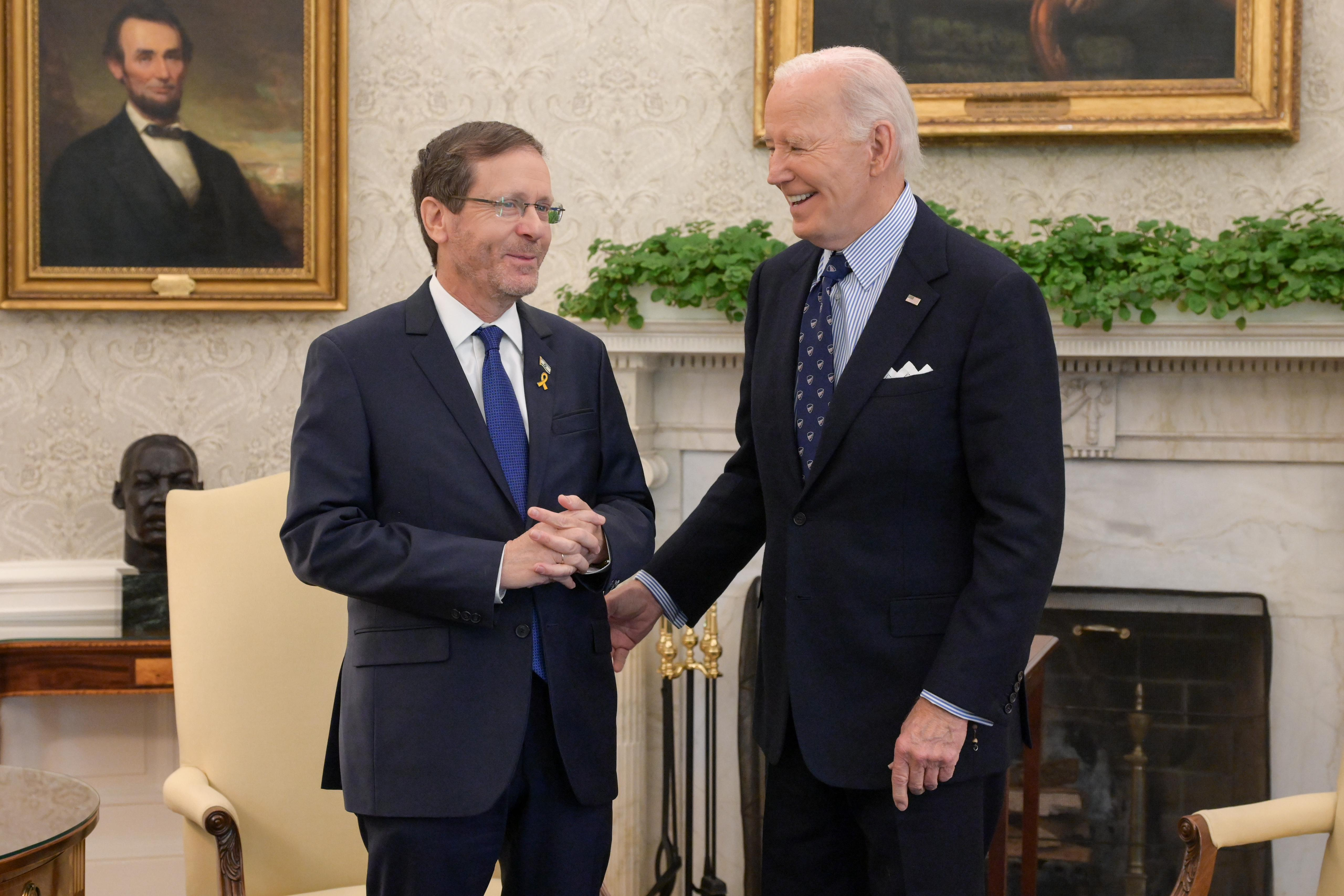
Herzog and Biden at the White House in Washington, D.C., 12 November 2024

- On 12 November, Israeli President Herzog arrived in Washington, D.C. for a state visit and met with President Joe Biden. He told Biden: "In the Bible, it says that Joseph will strengthen Israel. And clearly, Mr. President, you've done that."
- The Biden administration said on 12 November that Israel has successfully increased the flow of humanitarian aid to Gaza and will continue to receive arms transfers from US. The United States had threatened a month ago if the situation had not improved, it would halt arm transfer to Israel. The relief groups are of the opinion that conditions are now worse than they were at any point during the 13-month-old war.
- HuffPost reported that the Biden administration persuaded Democratic senators to vote against a resolution to halt the sale of tank shells to Israel, requested by prominent progressives and mainstream Democratic senators. The resolution failed by a vote of 79 to 18.

=== 2025 ===
==== February ====
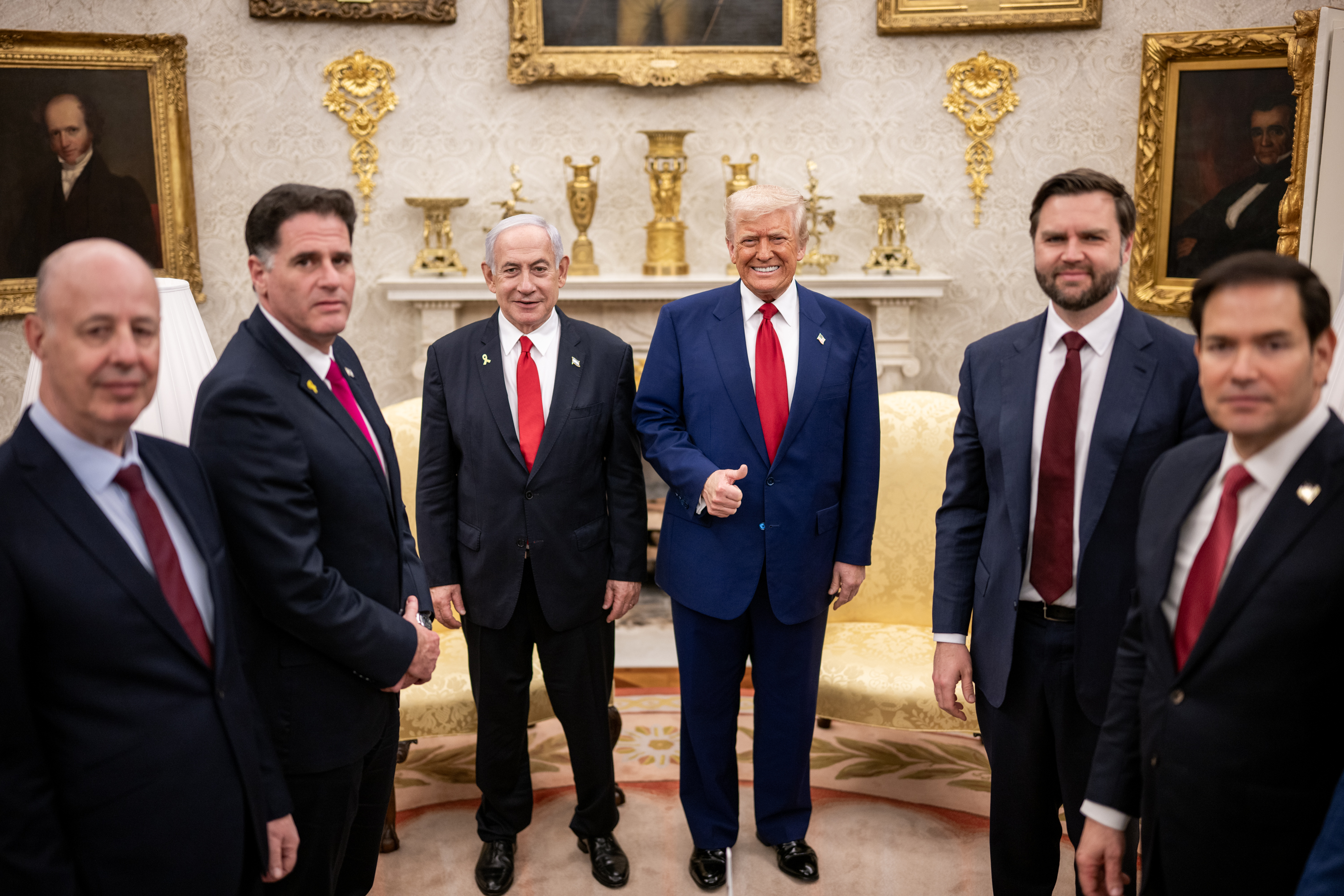
US President Donald Trump receiving Israeli Prime Minister Benjamin Netanyahu at the White House on 7 April 2025

- On 4 February 2025, in a joint press conference with Benjamin Netanyahu, President Trump proposed that the United States "take over" the Gaza Strip and re-develop it.
- On 28 February 2025, President Trump approved an over $2.5 billion arms sale to Israel, which included 35,500 MK 84 and BLU-117 bombs and 4,000 Predator warheads.

==== March ====
- Instead of continuing to the second phase of the ceasefire per the original agreement, Israel proposed a new plan (called the "Witkoff plan" after Steve Witkoff), in which Hamas would release the Israeli captives in exchange for a 50-day extension of the ceasefire, with Israel retaining the option of returning to war. Hamas rejected this new proposal, which differed from the terms agreed in January 2025.
- On 23 March 2025, President Trump's Middle East Special Envoy Steve Witkoff blamed Hamas for renewed fighting in Gaza, saying that "Hamas had every opportunity to demilitarize, to accept the bridging proposal that would have given us a 40- or 50-day ceasefire where we could have discussed demilitarization and a final truce."

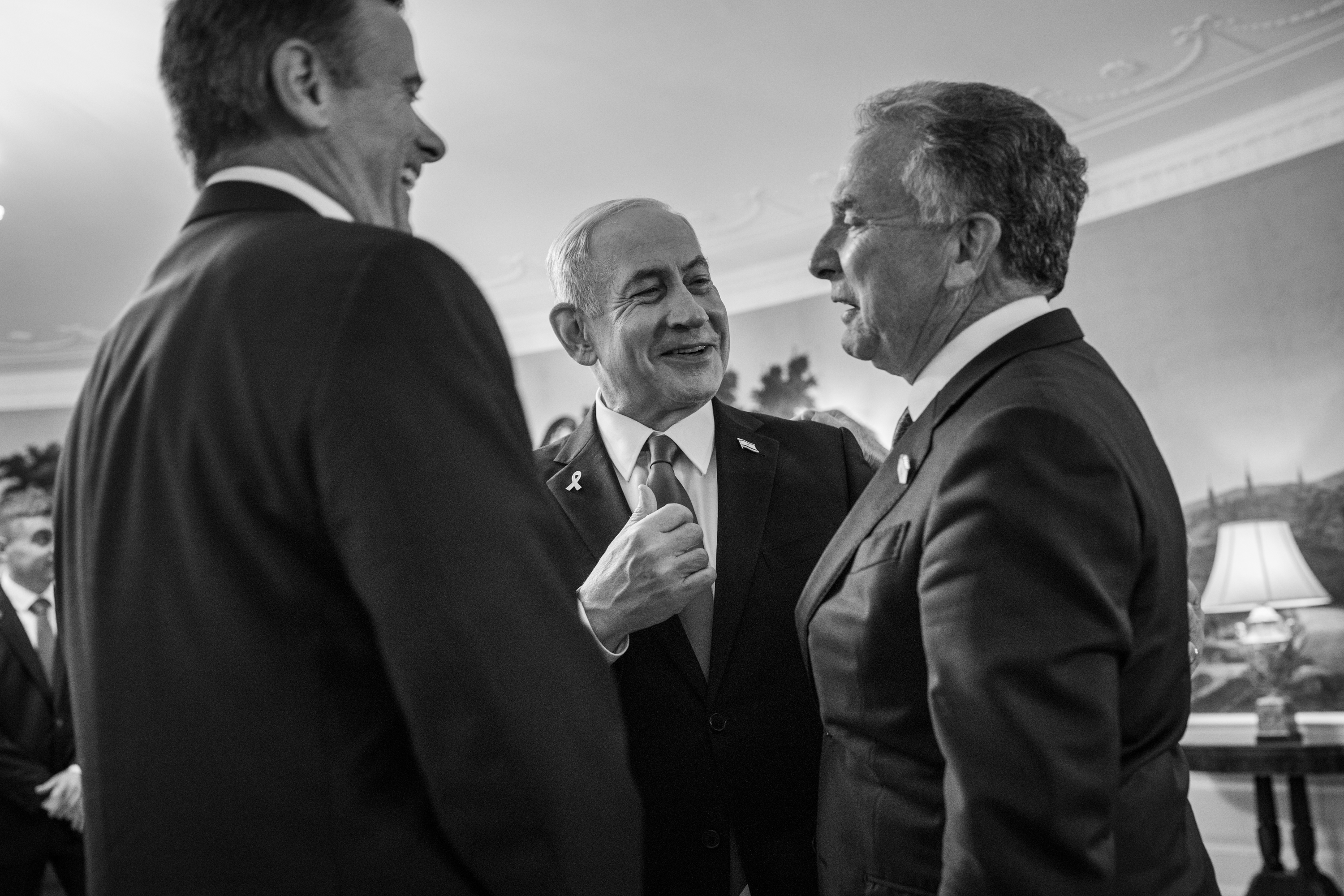
CIA Director John Ratcliffe and Trump's Middle East Envoy Steve Witkoff with Israeli Prime Minister Benjamin Netanyahu, 7 July 2025

==== June ====
- On 1 June 2025, the IDF killed at least 32 civilians and wounded over 200 at the aid centre in Rafah. Pro-Palestinian social media accounts referred to the 1 June incident as the "Witkoff massacre", referring to US Middle East envoy Steve Witkoff, who had endorsed Israel's plan to take over aid delivery in Gaza.
- In June 2025, the UN Security Council adopted a resolution urging the immediate and unconditional lifting of all restrictions on the entry of food and humanitarian aid into Gaza, citing the city's “catastrophic” situation. Fourteen countries voted in favor of the resolution, while the United States exercised its veto.
- In June 2025, American evangelical leader and businessman Johnnie Moore Jr. was appointed the executive chairman of the Gaza Humanitarian Foundation (GHS). The functioning of the organization has been marked by repeated mass killings in the vicinity of GHF distribution sites.

==== August ====
- US President Donald Trump said on Tuesday that the full occupation of Gaza was "pretty much up to Israel".
- On 16 August 2025, the US State Department has announced that it has suspended the issuance of visitor visas to people from the Gaza Strip, including children who require urgent medical care.

==== September ====
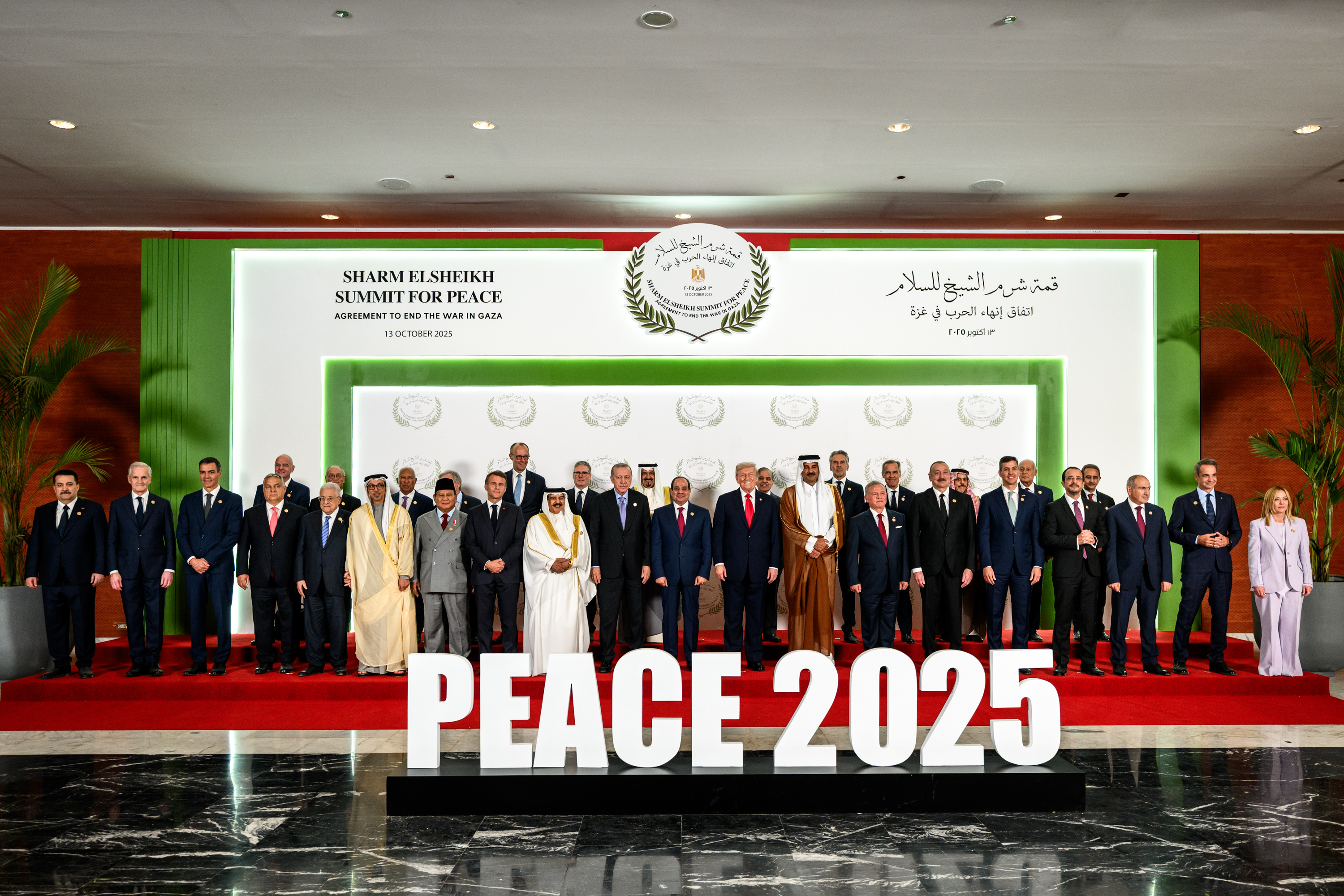
Trump at the Gaza peace summit in Sharm El Sheikh, Egypt, 13 October 2025

- The US State Department has sanctioned three Palestinian human rights groups that have called on the International Criminal Court to investigate allegations of war crimes in Gaza and arrest Israeli leaders.
- On 29 September 2025, Trump announced, alongside Benjamin Netanyahu, a 20-Point Gaza Peace Plan from the White House which consisted of 20 specific points aimed at achieving a ceasefire, the return of Israeli hostages, dismantling Hamas's military capabilities, and establishing a transitional governance structure in the Gaza Strip.

==== October ====
- Trump announced his deal for a ceasefire between Israel and Hamas had been reached and that the remaining hostages would be released.
- British journalist Sami Hamdi was detained by federal immigration authorities at San Francisco International Airport on October 26 for criticizing Israel's ongoing military operation in Gaza while giving a speech in the United States, according to Council on American–Islamic Relations.

== Pro-Israel lobby ==
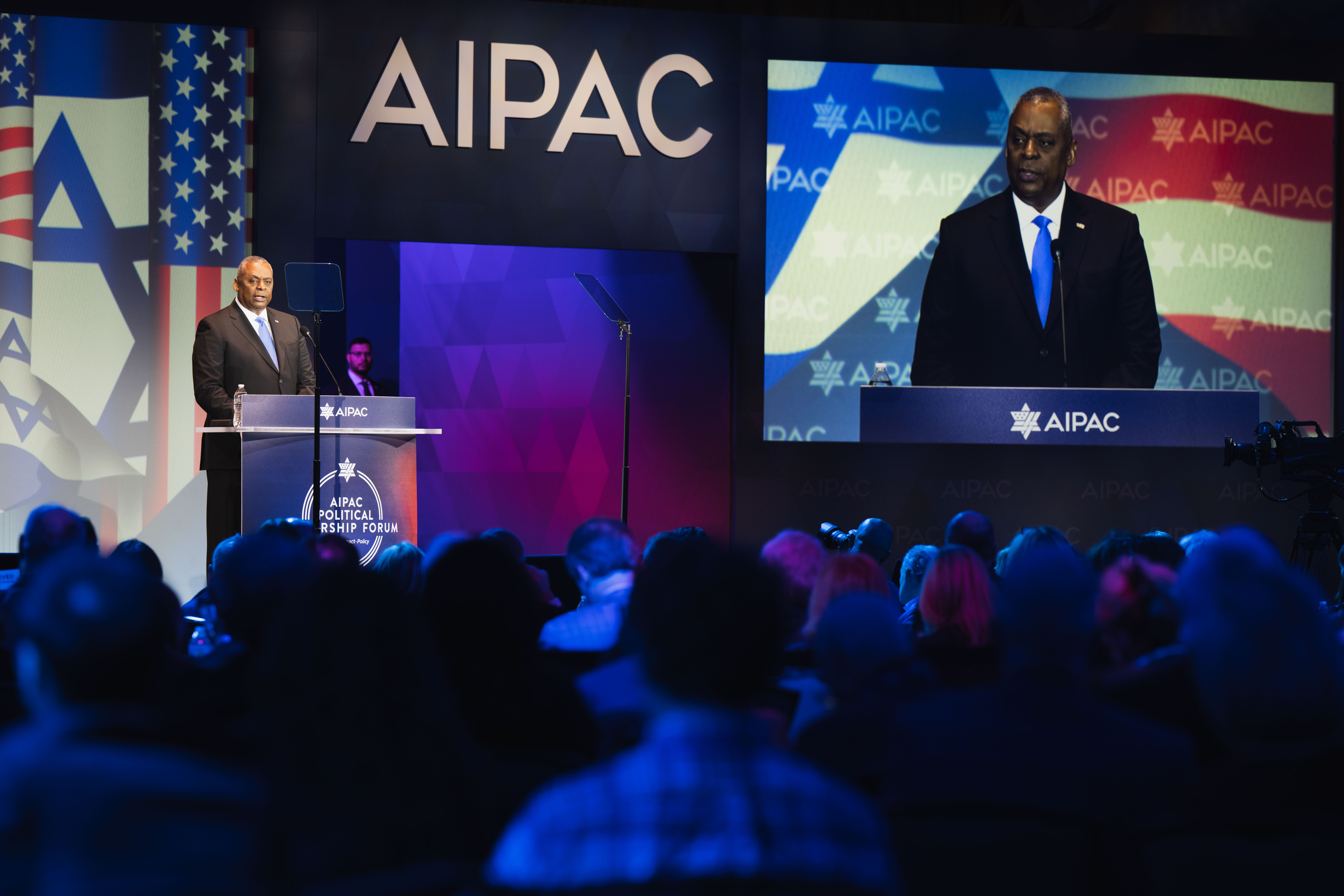
Secretary of Defense Lloyd Austin speaks at the AIPAC Political Leadership Forum in Washington, D.C., 2023

On 30 October 2023, AIPAC, a leading pro-Israel lobbying group, issued a public critique of the members of Congress who voted against House Resolution 771, which expressed support for Israel. In response, Republican Thomas Massie defended his vote by saying he objected to a broad "open-ended promise of military support," while Democrats Cori Bush, Mark Pocan and Alexandria Ocasio-Cortez accused AIPAC of harming US democracy. On 1 November, Ilhan Omar accused AIPAC of running Islamophobic ads against her. On 2 November, Rashida Tlaib, who is of Palestinian descent, was the target of a $100,000 TV ad campaign by the Democratic Majority for Israel.

The Republican-controlled House of Representatives on 5 December passed a resolution that included language that said the House "clearly and firmly states that anti-Zionism is antisemitism". The resolution also condemned the slogan "From the river to the sea," for which Tlaib was censured on 5 November. Analysis from The Guardian showed that Congress members who were supportive of Israel from the beginning of the war had received an average of $100,000 more from pro-Israel donors than their pro-Palestinian colleagues. Analysis of Federal Election Commission filings showed House Speaker Mike Johnson received $95,000 from AIPAC.

In March 2024, a group of 20 progressive political organizations formed an anti-AIPAC coalition to push back against the lobbyist group's influence on U.S. politics. In response to comments by Senator Chuck Schumer that Israel needed new elections to replace Netanyahu, J Street stated the speech "signals a historic shift from those in the Democratic party who care deeply about Israel's future". Haaretz found that hundreds of fake social media accounts were targeting Democratic Party lawmakers with messages repeating Israeli government accusations relating to UNRWA and Hamas. Haaretz found Israel targeted U.S. lawmakers with an influence campaign, primarily focused on Black politicians. In July 2024, a group of more than 30 human rights organizations requested the Biden administration investigate these influence campaigns. Politico found that AIPAC was the largest source of Republican donors' money spent in 2024 Democratic primary races.

In an early June 2024 interview by the former Fox News host Tucker Carlson, the Republican U.S. Representative Thomas Massie stated that AIPAC has designated representatives assigned to each Republican member of Congress to ensure that the lawmakers vote for bills that Israel supports. He also questioned why the lobby group and their representatives are not required to register as foreign agents, which would be the case for those advocating on behalf of all other countries.

== Antisemitism Awareness Act ==
The Antisemitism Awareness Act, spearheaded by the Republicans but also backed by many Democrats, passed the United States House of Representatives in a 320–91 vote on 1 May 2024, and proceeded to the Senate.

== See also ==
- German support for Israel in the Gaza war
- Attacks on US bases during the Gaza war
- Esther Project
- Israel–United States military relations
- Israeli government response to the October 7 attacks
- List of military aid to Israel during the Gaza war
- List of companies involved in the Gaza war
- Negroponte doctrine
- United States-Israel relations
- Palestine–United States relations
- Project Esther
- United States complicity in Gaza genocide
- United States foreign policy in the Middle East
- United States atrocity crimes
