= Pollard (surname) =

Pollard is a surname. Notable people with the surname include:

== A–B ==
- A. J. Pollard (born 1941), English medieval historian
- Al Pollard (1928–2002), American football player
- Albert Pollard, (1869–1948), British historian of Tudor era
- Albert C. Pollard (born 1967), American politician
- Alice Pollard, Solomon Islands activist
- Alfred Oliver Pollard, (1893–1960), British author, awarded Victoria Cross
- Alfred W. Pollard (1859–1944), English Shakespearian scholar and bibliographer
- Amos Pollard (1803–1836), American surgeon at the Battle of the Alamo
- Amy Elizabeth Rosalie Pollard-Imrie (known as Clare Imrie, 1870–1944), Franciscan mother abbess, builder of St Mary of the Angels RC church, Liverpool
- Sir Amyas Pollard, 3rd Baronet (1616–1701), English gentleman and royalist in the English Civil War
- Anastasia Pollard, American-born English painter
- Andrew Pollard (biologist) (born 1965), British vaccinologist
- Andrew Pollard (educator) (born 1949), British academic
- Anthony Pollard (British Army officer) (born 1937), major-general
- Ackquille Jean Pollard (born 1994), American rapper known as Bobby Shmurda
- Art Pollard (1927–1973), American racecar driver
- Asa Pollard (1735–1775), American soldier in the Revolutionary War
- Ash Pollard (born 1986), Australian cook and media personality
- Benjamin Pollard (1890–1967), English Anglican bishop
- Bernard Pollard (born 1984), NFL safety for the Tennessee Titans
- Brandon Pollard (born 1973), American soccer player
- Brian Pollard (born 1954), English footballer
- Bruce Pollard (born 1945), Australian rugby league footballer

== C–E ==
- Calvin Pollard (1797–1850), American architect
- Carl Pollard (born 1947), American linguist
- Catherine Pollard (born 1960), Guyanese diplomat, Under Secretary-General of the United Nations
- Catherine Pollard (Scouting) (1918–2006), American scout master, first female scout master in the BSA
- Charles Pollard (disambiguation), several people
- Chris Pollard, American college baseball coach
- Clare Pollard (born 1978), English poet and dramatist
- Claude Pollard (1874–1942), Attorney General of Texas (1927–1929)
- Coral Bernadine Pollard (born c. 1940), Barbadian artist
- Courtland Pollard (1899–1977), American football coach
- Daisi Pollard (born 1980), American model
- Dan Pollard, Canadian broadcaster
- D. T. Pollard (Danny Pollard), American writer
- Daphne Pollard (1891–1978), Australian-born vaudeville performer, later US film actress
- Deana Pollard Sacks (born 1964), American legal educator and writer
- Darryl Pollard (born 1964), American football player
- David Pollard (disambiguation), several people
- Derek Pollard (born 1939), British academic and nuclear chemist
- DeRionne P. Pollard, President of Montgomery College since 2010
- Devonta Pollard (born 1994), American professional basketball player
- Dick Pollard (footballer) (1913–1966), Australian rules footballer
- Doug Pollard (born 1957), Canadian soccer player
- Ed Pollard (born 1962), Barbadian boxer
- Edward A. Pollard (1832–1872), American author of The Lost Cause and newspaperman with the Richmond Examiner 1832–1872
- Edwin Pollard (born 1942), High Commissioner of Barbados in London (2003–2008)
- Eric Pollard (skier), United States freestyle skier and film editor
- Ernest Pollard (disambiguation), several people
- Eve Pollard (born 1945), British journalist

== F–J ==
- Frank Pollard (born 1957), American football player
- Frank Pollard (politician) (1870–1951), Australian politician
- Frederick Pollard (disambiguation), also Fritz Pollard, several people
- Gary Pollard (born 1959), English footballer
- George Pollard (disambiguation), several people
- Graham Pollard (1903–1976), English bookseller and bibliophile
- Greg Pollard (born 1960), Australian squash player
- Handré Pollard (born 1994), South African rugby union player playing for the Vodacom Bulls in the United Rugby Championship.
- H. B. Pollard, first postmaster of Ashland, Kentucky
- Harry Pollard (disambiguation), several people
- Helen Perlstein Pollard (born 1946), American academic ethnohistorian and archaeologist
- Henry Moses Pollard (1836–1904), American politician
- Hugh Pollard (disambiguation), several people
- Ingrid Pollard (born 1953), English artist and photographer
- J. W. H. Pollard (1872–1957), American college sports coach
- Jack Pollard (1926–2002), Australian sports writer and historian of cricket
- James Pollard (1792–1867), British painter
- James Pollard (soldier) (1919–1942), Australian private who was killed in the Ration Truck massacre
- Jamie Pollard, American athletics director
- Jane Pollard (born 1972), English artist film maker
- Jill Pollard (born 1935), British gymnast
- Jim Pollard (1922–1993), American basketball player
- John Pollard (disambiguation), several people
- Jon Pollard (disambiguation), several people
- Jonathan Pollard, US intelligence analyst; Israeli spy
- Josephine Pollard (1834–1892), US hymn writer, author and poet
- Justin Pollard (born 1968), British historian and writer

== K–P ==
- Keith Pollard (born 1950), American comic book artist
- Keith Pollard (rugby league) (born 1946), English rugby league footballer and coach
- Kerry Pollard (born 1944) an English politician
- Kevin Pollard (born 1958), Canadian politician
- Kieron Pollard (born 1987), West Indies cricketer
- Larry Pollard (born 1954), Canadian stock-car racing driver
- Lee Pollard (born 1979), English cricketer
- Leslie Pollard (born 1956), American Seventh-day Adventist minister
- Lewis Pollard (c.1465-1526), English Justice of the Common Pleas and MP
- Lindsey Pollard, Canadian animator
- Luke Pollard (born 1980), British politician
- Marcus Pollard (born 1972), American footballer
- Margaret Steuart Pollard (1904–1996), English scholar of Sanskrit and poet
- Marjorie Pollard (1899–1982), English hockey player
- Mark Pollard (born 1979), Falkland Islands politician
- Martin Pollard (born 1977), English cricketer
- Mary Pollard (1922–2005), English/Irish librarian and specialist in early printed books
- Michael Pollard (cricketer) (born 1989), New Zealand cricketer
- Michael J. Pollard (1939–2019), American actor
- Mother Pollard (c. 1882/1885–before 1963), American church elder who participated in the 1955–1956 Montgomery Bus Boycott
- Myles Pollard (born 1972), Australian actor
- Nancy Pollard, American computer scientist, roboticist, and computer graphics researcher
- Nicholas Pollard Sr. (1924–2003), Belizean politician and trade union leader
- Nick Pollard (born 1950), British journalist
- Nicole Pollard, American fashion stylist
- Odell Pollard (1927–2015), Arkansas politician and attorney
- Pam Pollard, American politician active in Oklahoma
- Paul Pollard (born 1968), English cricketer
- Percy Pollard (1883–1948), Australian politician
- Percy F. Pollard (1892–?), British socialist activist

== R–S ==
- Red Pollard (1909–1981), Canadian jockey, best remembered as the regular rider of Seabiscuit
- Reg Pollard (general) (1903–1978), Australian military officer, Chief of the General Staff from 1960 to 1963
- Reg Pollard (politician) (1894–1981), Australian politician
- Richard Pollard (disambiguation), including Dick Pollard, several people
- Robert Pollard (disambiguation), also for Bob Pollard, several people
- Robin Pollard, New Zealand academic
- Roy Pollard (1927–2012), rugby league footballer for Great Britain, England, and Dewsbury
- Royce Pollard (1939–2025), American politician, mayor of Vancouver, Washington State
- Royce Pollard (American football) (born 1989), American footballer
- Russell Pollard (born 1975), American rock musician
- Sam Pollard (missionary) (1864–1915), Bible Christian Church missionary to China and inventor of the "Pollard script"
- Scot Pollard (born 1975), American basketball player and current NBA TV analyst
- Scott M. Pollard (born 1970), American attorney and Rhode Island politician
- Sean Pollard (born 1991), Australian Paralympian
- Sidney Pollard (1925–1998), British economic and labour historian
- Snub Pollard (1889–1962), Australian-born vaudevillian, American silent film comedian
- Stephen Pollard (born 1964), British journalist, editor of The Jewish Chronicle
- Stephen Pollard (cricketer) (born 1971), English cricketer
- Stu Pollard (born 1967), American film producer, writer and director
- Stuart Pollard, Australian sailor and property developer
- Su Pollard (born 1949), English comedy actress who starred in the BBC TV sitcom Hi-de-Hi!

== T–W ==
- Terry Pollard (1931–2009), American jazz pianist and vibraphone player
- Thomas Pollard (actor) (1597–1649×1655), English actor in the King's Men
- Thomas D. Pollard (born 1942), American biologist
- Tiffany Pollard (born 1982), American reality television star
- Tim Pollard (1964–2025), English actor and entertainer
- Timothy Pollard, American basketball player
- Tom Pollard (opera producer) (1857–1922), New Zealand comic opera producer and manager
- Tom Pollard (footballer) (1894–1941), Australian rules footballer
- Tommy Pollard (1923–1960), British piano and vibes player, co-founder of Club Eleven
- Tony Pollard (born 1997), American football player
- Tony Pollard (archaeologist) (born 1965), British battlefield archaeologist and television presenter
- Trent Pollard (born 1972), American footballer
- Velma Pollard (1937–2025), Jamaican poet and writer
- Vic Pollard (born 1945), English-born cricketer, active in New Zealand
- Walter Pollard (1906–1945), English footballer with Burnley, West Ham, Fulham and Southampton
- William Pollard (Quaker) (1828–1893), British Quaker minister
- William B. Pollard III (born 1947), American military judge
- William G. Pollard (1911–1989), American physicist
- William L. Pollard, American college/university President/Dean of multiple institutions
- William Pollard-Urquhart (1815–1871), American writer on economic and policy issues

== Fictional characters ==
- Cayce Pollard, fictional protagonist of William Gibson's novel Pattern Recognition (2003)
- Charley Pollard, character from the Big Finish Doctor Who releases
- Eric Pollard, character from British soap opera Emmerdale
- Val Pollard, character from Emmerdale, formerly married to Eric
- Vicky Pollard, character from British comedy show Little Britain
- Henry Pollard, character from the American comedy show Party Down

== See also ==
- Pollard (disambiguation)
