= Pollard =

Pollard may refer to:

== Places in the United States ==
- Pollard, Alabama, a town
- Pollard, Arkansas, a city
- Pollard, Kansas, an unincorporated community

== People ==
- Pollard (surname), a list of people with the surname
- Pollard Hopewell (between 1786 and 1789 – 1813), midshipman in the United States Navy
- Charles Pollard Olivier (1884–1975), American astronomer
- James Pollard Espy (1785–1860), American meteorologist
- Ngoia Pollard Napaltjarri (c. 1948–2022), Australian indigenous (Warlpiri people) artist
- Thomas Pollard Sampson (1875–1961), Australian architect

== Flora and fauna ==
- Pollard, a tree affected by pollarding (cropping of the upper branches)
- Pollard, a deer which has cast its antlers
- Pollard or polled livestock, hornless livestock of normally-horned species
- Pollard, the European chub (Squalius cephalus), a freshwater fish

== Mathematics ==
- Several algorithms created by British mathematician John Pollard:
  - Pollard's kangaroo algorithm
  - Pollard's p − 1 algorithm
  - Pollard's rho algorithm

== Other uses ==
- Pollard (coin), a medieval coin made in Europe in imitation of the English penny, outlawed under Edward I
- Pollard (novel), a novel by Laura Beatty
- Pollard, a mixture of fine bran and a small amount of flour
- Pollard railway station, former station in Victoria, Australia
- Pollard script, a writing system devised in 1905 for the A-Hmao language
- Polland
