= Jon Pollard =

Jon Pollard may refer to:

- Jonathan Pollard (born 1954), a former civilian intelligence analyst who was convicted of spying for Israel
- Jon Pollard (actor), Australian actor in Doom Runners (1997)

== See also ==
- John Pollard (disambiguation)
- Jon
- Pollard (disambiguation)
