= Rafi Eitan =

Israeli politician and intelligence officer (1926–2019)

- רפי איתן
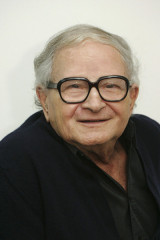

Ministerial roles
- 2006–2009: Minister of Pensioner Affairs

Faction represented in the Knesset
- 2006–2009: Gil

Personal details
- Born: 23 November 1926 Ein Harod, Mandatory Palestine
- Died: 23 March 2019 (aged 92) Tel Aviv, Israel

Rafael Eitan (Hebrew: רפי איתן; 23 November 1926 – 23 March 2019) was an Israeli politician and intelligence officer. He also led Gil and served as Minister of Senior Citizens. He was in charge of the Mossad operation that led to the arrest of Adolf Eichmann. He served as an advisor on terrorism to Prime Minister Menachem Begin, and in 1981 he was appointed to head the Bureau of Scientific Relations, then an intelligence entity on par with Mossad, Aman and Shabak. Eitan assumed responsibility for and resigned over the Jonathan Pollard affair, and the Bureau was disbanded. He was subject to an arrest warrant issued by the United States FBI. From 1985 until 1993, he was head of the government's Chemicals company, which was expanded under his leadership. After 1993, he became a businessman, noted for several large scale agricultural and construction ventures in Cuba. He was the chairman of the Vetek (Seniority) Association – the Senior Citizens Movement.

== Biography ==
Raphael (Rafi) Hantman (later Eitan) was born on Kibbutz Ein Harod during the Mandate era. His parents were Zionist immigrants from Russia who came to Palestine in 1923. His father, Noah Hantman, was a farmer and poet, and his mother Yehudit Volwelsky was a social activist. They had four children, Rafi, Oded, Rina and Ami (Yechiam) and lived in Shalom, later Ramat HaSharon, then a small settlement of 100 families. Eitan went to a regular public junior high school, but finished his high school studies at the Agricultural School in Givat HaShlosha in 1940 before going to the London School of Economics for his BSc in Economics.

Eitan was an avid sculptor. Over the 30 years that he sculpted, Eitan produced over 100 pieces. He had a one-man show at the offices of the high-tech company "Brown".

Eitan died at Ichilov Hospital in Tel Aviv on 23 March 2019, at the age of 92. His funeral took place the following day. He was buried in Netanya in a civil ceremony.

== Military career ==
Eitan joined the Haganah and then the Palmach, the elite unit of the Haganah, upon completion of high school in 1944. Through clandestine operations, he was to assist the illegal immigration of Jewish refugees from Europe, who were fleeing Nazism, into Palestine. It was also during this time that he met Yitzhak Rabin, who would later become Israeli Prime Minister. He also took part in a raid on the Atlit detainee camp to free illegal Jewish immigrants being detained by the British, the Night of the Bridges, and the November 1946 killings of two Templers to deter the rest of the German Templer community from returning to their homes in Palestine following World War II. His most famous operation at this time was blowing up the British radar on Mount Carmel near the port city of Haifa, which was being used to track ships carrying illegal Jewish immigrants. To reach it, Eitan had to crawl underground through sewers, thus earning the name 'Rafi the Stinker', which would differentiate him in later years from the other Rafael Eitan, a well-known Israeli Chief of Staff and politician. While on an operation to assist illegal Jewish immigrants, he was injured in a mine explosion while planting mines to prevent the British from interfering and was rendered almost totally deaf. He relied on hearing aids for the rest of his life.

During the 1947–1948 civil war in Mandatory Palestine and the 1948 Arab-Israeli War Eitan served as a soldier in the Yiftach Brigade, participating in combat operations, and was wounded in combat on the day after Israeli independence was declared. He also served as an intelligence officer.

== Intelligence career ==
From his service as an intelligence officer, he was propelled to commanding posts in the internal intelligence agency (Shin Bet). Later, Eitan served as Chief of Coordination between Shin Bet and Mossad. This position would allow him the biggest triumph in a post-Holocaust Israel: the capture of Adolf Eichmann. After Mossad located Eichmann and his family living in Argentina under assumed names, Eitan and his team were sent by the Israeli government on a covert mission to capture Eichmann and extract him to Israel, as it was unlikely the Argentine government would respond favorably to an extradition request. The mission was a major success. Eichmann later stood trial in Jerusalem for atrocities against the Jewish people during World War II. After being convicted by an Israeli court, Eichmann was executed. While working to apprehend Eichmann, Eitan personally vetoed a proposal to also capture and extract Josef Mengele. Like Eichmann, Mengele fled to South America in 1945 and at the time was also living in Argentina while under Mossad surveillance. Eitan argued that redirecting the mission's focus to incorporate also capturing Mengele could jeopardize the larger goal of bringing Eichmann to justice.

During 1964–1966, Eitan headed a two-year operation in which armaments sold and delivered by the Germans to the Egyptian government 'disappeared'. In those days, Israel had no peace treaty with Egypt.

In 1968 Eitan, posing as an Israeli Ministry of Defense chemist, visited the U.S. Nuclear Materials and Equipment Corporation (NUMEC) nuclear fuel plant. It emerged that 200 pounds (91 kg) of highly enriched uranium had disappeared from the plant, and it was alleged that the material had been diverted to Israel in an operation that became known as The Apollo Affair.

Eitan was also involved in the planning and implementation of the attack on the Iraqi Osirak nuclear reactor in June 1981. In June 1984, Eitan was responsible for an espionage operation against the United States during which he recruited Naval Intelligence Analyst Jonathan Jay Pollard to steal American intelligence material. The operation lasted eighteen months and was shut down after the arrest of Pollard, who was convicted and served 30 years of a life sentence.

Eitan continued his work in intelligence until 1972, when he left the organization and went on to the private sector, raising tropical fish and other agricultural ventures. But in 1978, the government of Menachem Begin, the then Prime Minister of Israel, called him back to be his advisor on terrorism, as Eitan was regarded and admired as one of the most respected experts in this field. In 1981, Eitan was named head of the Defense Ministry's Lekem, the Bureau for Scientific Relations, replacing Israeli spy-master Benjamin Blumberg, where he continued work on counter-terrorism. According to the British journalist, Gordon Thomas, Eitan then participated in a partnership between Israeli and U.S. intelligence during the early 1980s in selling to foreign intelligence agencies in excess of $500 million worth of licenses to a trojan horse version of the Washington, D.C.–based, Inslaw Inc.'s people-tracking software called PROMIS, in order to spy on them. In 1984, Lekem was put in touch with Jonathan Pollard, an American citizen, who worked on anti-terrorist activities at the US Naval Investigative Services. According to Jefferson Morley, Pollard was an agent run by Eitan. Pollard had contacted the Israeli government with top secret information on the terrorist activities of Israel's enemies. Jonathan Pollard was exposed and arrested in the US in 1985. His arrest revealed the existence of Lekem to US authorities.

Also in California, a US Aerospace Engineer, Richard Kelly Smyth, the president of a company called MILCO, was indicted in 1985 for smuggling over 800 krytrons to Israel without the required US State Department Munitions Export License. Because of their potential for use as triggers of nuclear weapons, the export of krytrons is tightly regulated in the United States. A number of cases involving the smuggling or attempted smuggling of krytrons have been reported, as countries seeking to develop nuclear weapons have attempted to procure supplies of krytrons for igniting their weapons. Just before trial, and facing a possible 105 years in prison, Richard Kelly Smyth and his wife suddenly disappeared. Sixteen years later they were discovered and arrested while living as fugitives in Málaga, Spain, and extradited back to the United States where he was convicted in the case. The krytrons shipped by Smyth were sent to an Israeli company called Heli-Trading Ltd. owned by prominent Israeli movie producer Arnon Milchan. Before his prominent Hollywood career, Milchan had served for decades as a Lekem agent, under the direct command of Eitan's predecessor, Benjamin Blumberg. It later became clear that the company MILCO served as a Lekem front company for obtaining sensitive equipment, technologies and materials for Israeli secret defense-related programs, and in particular its nuclear program.

The Israeli government asserted that the MILCO krytron incident was a simple mistake by the "exporter" MILCO, and that the Pollard operation was an unauthorized deviation from its policy of not conducting espionage in the United States, before an admission in 1998 of Israeli responsibility. In 1987 the Israeli government set up a commission to investigate Lekem's failure, which found it would be in Israel's interest to take responsibility for the Pollard case. In 1987 following the difficult Pollard and MILCO cases, the Israeli government decided to disband Lekem, whose functions were assigned to the Director of Security of the Defense Establishment, adding technical and scientific intelligence to its responsibilities which include internal investigations of the defense ministry.

Following the disbandment of Lekem, Eitan was offered the position as head of the state-owned Israel Chemicals Corporation, from which he retired in 1993 at the age of 67. During his tenure, the company underwent a rapid expansion in terms of sales, development and manpower, making it the largest government-held firm in the country. In 1998 he appeared in the documentary special The Spy Machine, produced by Open Media and Israfilm and shown on Channel 4.

=== Advisor on counter-terrorism ===
Further revelations from the book Gideon's Spies:The Secret History of the Mossad by Gordon Thomas, describe how the Margaret Thatcher government in Britain during the mid-1980s developed a relationship with Eitan as an advisor to the Secret Intelligence Service (MI6) on counterterrorism operations in Northern Ireland. This relationship came to a head in 1985, when Mossad agents helped track a Provisional Irish Republican Army (IRA) bomb team in Gibraltar. The three-member IRA team was killed (Operation Flavius) by the British Special Air Service, under highly controversial circumstances. It was subsequently reported in British papers that Eitan and Mossad had played a surveillance role in the operation, and IRA command put out orders for assassination teams in Ireland and Britain to find and kill Rafi Eitan. Due to this threat of assassination, and the embarrassment of the Israeli government over Eitan's unauthorized relationship with the operation, Eitan left Britain and ended his relationship with Britain's intelligence services. This incident strained Israeli/British relations for several years.

== Business career ==
In 1992, Eitan was approached to bid on a contract for an agricultural deal in Cuba, which involved the cultivation of the largest citrus grove cooperative on the island. After winning the bid, Eitan built a partnership with four other international entrepreneurs to run the deal. The company BM Group was incorporated in Panama, and traded with Israeli suppliers.

Due to the success of the venture and the connections acquired, BM also won the contract to build the world trade center in Havana, and a Holocaust Memorial at the center of the Old City of Havana. Recently, GBM was awarded the "Medal for Agricultural Work" by the Cuban government.

In addition to this deal, BM has started expanding its business deals to the rest of Latin America. It runs various agricultural projects in the Dominican Republic, among others.

== Political career ==
Eitan was asked to represent the pensioners' party Gil in the 2006 Knesset elections. The party went on to win seven seats, despite predictions that it would not secure more than three, at best, and would not pass the vote threshold, at worst. In the 2009 elections the party failed to cross the electoral threshold, and Eitan lost his seat.

In February 2010, Eitan remarked "In principle, when there is a war on terror you conduct it without principles. You simply fight it.".

In 2018 Eitan caused surprise and shock in Israel and Germany when he publicly endorsed the far-right Alternative for Germany (AfD) party. He said: “Please understand that all of us in Israel appreciate your attitude toward Judaism. In any case, I’m sure that if you work wisely strongly and most important realistically… I’m sure that instead of ‘Alternative for Germany,’ you might become an alternative for all of Europe.” Jeremy Issacharoff, Israel’s Ambassador to Germany, wrote: “It is hard to believe how the person who captured Eichmann … is able to praise German right-wingers who so admire the Nazi past and wish on us that they become the alternative of Europe! Sad and shameful.”

== Published works ==
- Ish Hasod ("The Secret Man"), 2020
