= Director of Security of the Defense Establishment =

Israeli government position

Malmab
Agency overview
- Formed: 1958
- Jurisdiction: Israel; Shimon Peres Negev Nuclear Research Center; Israel Institute for Biological Research
- Agency executive: Gil Reich
- Parent department: Ministry of Defense

The Director of Security of the Defense Establishment, Ministry of Defense Security Authority, Malmab (Hebrew: הממונה על הביטחון במערכת הביטחון, Ha-Memune al ha-bitahon be-Ma'arechet Ha-Bitahon), or simply Malmab, is a department in the Ministry of Defense that is responsible for deep security operations protecting military secrets, especially surrounding Israeli weapons industries. Their jurisdiction covers institutions dealing in the development and production of weapons of mass destruction, defensive centers such as the Negev Nuclear Research Center, Israel Institute for Biological Research and military units engaged in these areas.

Malmab was established in 1958, under the leadership of Haim Kermun, former Shin Bet officer.

Malmab investigates the function of the workers, security audits, certification of the exposure technology, corruption and preventing leakage of classified information.

Malmab also operates as an Intelligence Agency—as Malmab runs agents who are responsible for dealing with obtaining technological information and intelligence in foreign countries. This area was previously the responsibility of Science Affairs Bureau (or Lekem), but in 1986, after the Pollard affair, the Lekem powers were transferred.

== Directors of Malmab ==
No.	Image	Name	Term start	Term end	Ref.
1		Haim Kermun	1958	1986	
2		Yehiel Horev	1986	2007	
3		Amir Kane	2007	2015	
4		Nir Ben Moshe	2015	2021	
—		Gil Ben Ami	February 2021	October 2021	
5		Youval Shimoni	October 2021	May 2026	
6		Gil Reich	June 2026		

== See also ==
- National Administration for the Protection of State Secrets
