= Andrew Pollard =

Andrew Pollard may refer to:

- Andrew Pollard (educator) (born 1949), British educator
- Andrew Pollard (immunologist) (born 1965), British immunologist
