= Capturing Jonathan Pollard =

2006 book by Ronald J. Olive

- Author: Ronald J. Olive
- Language: English
- Subject: Jonathan Pollard
- Publisher: Naval Institute Press
- Publication date: August 11, 2006
- Publication place: United States
- Pages: 299
- ISBN: 1-59114-652-6

Capturing Jonathan Pollard: How One of the Most Notorious Spies in American History Was Brought to Justice is a book about the Jonathan Pollard espionage case. It was written by the Navy counterintelligence special agent Ronald J. Olive, who led the effort to capture Pollard. The book was published by the Naval Institute Press in 2006.

== Reception ==
Parameters called it a "powerful and sobering book" which is not primarily about the relationship between Israel and the United States, but about faltering systems for protecting very sensitive material.

== See also ==
- 1985: The Year of the Spy
- Lekem
- List of American spies
