= Multiple Threat Alert Center =

US Navy threat intelligence center

The United States Department of the Navy's Multiple Threat Alert Center (MTAC) provides indications and warning for a wide range of threats to Navy and Marine Corps personnel and assets around the world.

Operated by the Naval Criminal Investigative Service (NCIS), the MTAC utilizes NCIS' worldwide presence and combination of law enforcement, counterintelligence, intelligence and security capabilities to identify all available threat indicators. Analysts, special agents, and military personnel work in the MTAC around the clock to produce indications and warning of possible terrorist activity, foreign intelligence threats and criminal threats that may affect naval operations. MTAC is located at NCIS headquarters in Quantico, Virginia.

The MTAC is an outgrowth of the Navy Anti-Terrorist Alert Center (ATAC). The ATAC was established in December 1983 to address the terrorist threat after the bombing of the Marine Corps barracks in Beirut, Lebanon, and the murders of Navy officers in Greece by the Revolutionary Organization 17 November and in El Salvador by the FMLN. As the first 24-hour terrorism watch center in the U.S. Intelligence Community, the ATAC successfully supported the Navy and Marine Corps team for nearly two decades.

The MTAC epitomizes the multi-faceted nature of the NCIS mission by linking terrorism, counterintelligence, intelligence, cyber, criminal, and security information. The MTAC is a unique platform in that it merges intelligence from other agencies with information from NCIS source networks and law enforcement activities worldwide to provide the most relevant operational support to Navy and Marine Corps commanders.

== Jonathan Pollard ==
Convicted Israeli spy Jonathan Pollard was a civilian intelligence analyst at the ATAC from June 1984 until his arrest in November 1985. Retired Naval Investigative Service/NCIS Special Agent Ron Olive outlines Pollard's espionage activities in the 2006 book Capturing Jonathan Pollard.

== USS Cole incident ==
A growing appreciation of the changing threat facing the Department of the Navy in the 21st century, culminating with the terrorist attacks against USS Cole in Aden, Yemen, and September 11, 2001, led NCIS to transform the ATAC into the MTAC in 2002.

== In popular culture ==
A version of the Multiple Threat Alert Center is featured on the drama television show, NCIS. However, within the series, it is called the "Multiple Threat Assessment Center" and is located at the Washington Navy Yard, where the series takes place.
