= Deana (disambiguation) =

Deana most often refers to Deana, a genus of moths.

Deana may also refer to:

== Surname ==
- Steven Deana (b. 1990), Swiss professional footballer and goalkeeper

== Given name ==
- Deana Carter (b. 1966), American country music singer-songwriter
- Deana Haggag, American arts organization leader
- Deana Horváthová, Slovak producer and actress
- Deana Lawson (b. 1979), American artist, educator and photographer
- Deana Martin, American singer and actress, daughter of singer Dean Martin
- Deana Pollard Sacks, American legal educator, author, and professor of law
- Deana Uppal (b. 1989), English beauty pageant titleholder, actress and business entrepreneur
- Deana L. Weibel, anthropologist and author in the United States

== See also ==
- Deanna
