= Harry Pollard =

Harry Pollard may refer to:

- Harry Pollard (mathematician) (1919–1985), American mathematician
- Harry Pollard (photographer) (1880–1968), Canadian photographer
- Harry A. Pollard (1879–1934), American silent film actor, director, and screenwriter
- Snub Pollard (Harry Pollard, 1889–1962), Australian-born silent movie comedian
