= Mary James (educator) =

British academic

Mary James FAcSS retired in January 2014 as Professor and Associate Director of Research at the University of Cambridge, Faculty of Education. In the same year she completed her four-year term as Vice President and President of the British Education and Research Association.

She was born in Dorking, Surrey, England on 21 March 1946. Her father was a carpenter and joiner and her mother was a factory worker. Mary was educated at Sondes Place Secondary Modern School and West Ewell Country Secondary School before qualifying as a teacher at Brighton College of Education. She was then in the first cohort to be awarded a BEd degree from Sussex University in 1968. Subsequently, she gained an MA from the Institute of Education University of London (1979) and a PhD from the Open University (1990).

== Biography ==
Mary taught for ten years in secondary schools, including:

- Park Barn County Secondary School, Guildford (1968–1970)
- Portsmouth Southern Grammar School for Girls (1970–1974)
- Hatch End High School, Harrow (1974–1979)

In 1979 she started a career in educational research at the Open University and subsequently moved to Cambridge Institute of Education as a tutor (in 1989). The Cambridge Institute became incorporated in the University of Cambridge in 1992 where she became a Senior Lecturer and then a Reader. She was also elected as a Fellow of Lucy Cavendish College Cambridge in 1996. In 2005 she left Cambridge to take up a Chair in Education at the Institute of Education. From 2002 to 2007 she was Deputy Director of the ESRC’s Teaching and Learning Research Programme. She held an Economic and Social Research Council Director's Fellowship in 2008. At the end of 2008 she took up a part-time post as Associate Director of Research at the University of Cambridge Faculty of Education. From 2013-2015 she was also Non-executive Director of Bell Educational Services.

== Research interests ==
Throughout her career in teaching and research, Mary has been interested in finding out what teachers might do to improve learning by investigating what happens in their interactions with students, the curriculum and school structures. After moving into higher education, this interest initially developed into research and teaching on school self-evaluation and teacher action-research. During a period of five years (1985–90) when she was involved in a large government-funded evaluation of records of achievement schemes (PRAISE), she became increasingly interested in the idea that assessment by teachers in classrooms could be a powerful tool for improving learning. This often requires them to rethink what it means ‘to teach’ and ‘to assess’ and to place more emphasis on eliciting and interpreting evidence of learning as a basis for planning teaching to support learners in their efforts to improve.

Traditional views of practice, cultural and institutional expectations, and external policy sometimes inhibit change, therefore, another area of research interest has been the impact of national, local and school policy on classroom practice and students’ experience. She has published widely in all these areas. In 2013 her selected works were published by Routledge in their World Library of Educationalists.

These two complementary strands of research activity also found expression in her work as founding editor (1990–1996) of The Curriculum Journal, and in her membership of the Assessment Reform Group from 1992.

Mary's research interests in assessment, teaching, learning, curriculum, teacher development and school improvement came together in a major ESRC TLRP development and research project: Learning How to Learn – in classrooms, schools and networks’. This involved collaborative work over four years (2001–2005) among five universities (Institute of Education, Cambridge University, University of Reading, The Open University and King's College, London) and 40 primary and secondary schools. Its overarching aim was to develop and test a model of how pedagogical knowledge about how pupils learn how to learn, building on assessment for learning, is created and applied in classrooms under particular organisational conditions. It also investigated how this knowledge can be successfully transferred between teachers and between schools. Publications from this project can be accessed via the TLRP website.

From 2002-2008 she was also Deputy Director of the Teaching and Learning Research Programme as a whole, with special responsibility for 22 projects and for synthesising findings into 10 evidence-informed principles for effective teaching and learning.
