= Shelbourne railway station =

Former railway station in Victoria, Australia

Shelbourne

General information
- Coordinates: 36°55′19″S 144°03′36″E
- Line: Shelbourne
- Platforms: 1
- Tracks: 3

Other information
- Status: Closed and Demolished

History
- Opened: 1891
- Closed: 1970

Services
Preceding station	Disused railways	Following station
Pollard	Shelbourne	Terminus
	List of closed railway stations in Victoria	
Location

Shelbourne railway station was the terminus of the short Shelbourne branch line, located in the locality of Shelbourne, Victoria Australia. An extension of the line was partially constructed, and was planned to terminate at Laanecoorie, Victoria. This extension was never used, and Shelbourne station was the terminus for as long as the line was open. Some embankments and cuttings of this extension still survive, as do cattle pits and remnants of two trestle bridges that were built over Bradford Creek.

The last service ran on 15 January 1969. Bushfires destroyed several of the trestle bridges and this was used as a reason to close the line.

The only things that remain are two old grain silos and remnants of the passenger platform. The station is located on private property, with the grain silos in fair condition.
