= Yosef Amit =

Israeli military intelligence major (born 1945)

- Born: יוסף עמית; 1945; Kiryat Bialik, Israel
- Died: 2025 (aged 79–80)
- Education: Naval Officers' School in Acre
- Spouse: Tzila
- Children: 2
- Espionage activity
- Allegiance: Israel / United States
- Service branch: Shin Bet
- Service years: 1963–1978
- Rank: Major

Yosef Amit (Hebrew: יוסף עמית; 1945 – June 2025) was a former Israeli military intelligence major who was convicted of espionage in 1987. Amit is thought to have spied for the United States and a European NATO country, though this has never been confirmed by the Israeli government.

== Early life and career ==
Amit was born in Kiryat Bialik in 1945 to Eliyahu and Tova Lizra. He was conscripted into the Israel Defense Forces (IDF) in 1963, serving in the Paratroopers Brigade, later transferring to the Israeli Navy and graduating from the Naval Officers' School in Acre. In 1967 he left the IDF to work as a policeman, rejoining the army in 1970. Amit was wounded in a clash with Palestinian guerrillas on the Lebanese border in 1972. He worked as a military intelligence officer from the Yom Kippur War until 1979. Amit reached the rank of major, and was placed in command of a military intelligence base on the Lebanese border. He served in Unit 504 of military intelligence, whose function was to operate agents in Arab countries. During his tenure as a military intelligence officer, Amit tried to profit by selling drugs, and he was arrested for drug dealing in 1978. Prior to his court-martial, he was declared mentally unfit to stand trial. He was discharged from the IDF, and spent three years in a psychiatric hospital. Following his release, Amit studied at the University of Haifa from 1982 to 1984, when he dropped out to work as a private investigator.

Amit's wife, Tzila, was a physical education teacher at the Yavnieli school in Haifa. They had two sons: Yuval and Oded.

== Espionage ==
While working as a private investigator, Amit met an American naval officer whose ship had docked in Haifa at a bar in the city, and Amit told him about his experiences in Israeli intelligence. The officer informed his superiors, and a plan to recruit Amit as a spy was devised. The officer told Amit that he intended to retire from the US Navy, settle in West Germany and start a business. Amit responded that he had a wish to make good money, and suggested that they do business together, to which he agreed. Amit travelled to West Germany sometime later, where he met the officer, who introduced him to his "friends", who were in fact CIA officers from the U.S. Embassy in Bonn. They successfully recruited Amit as a spy. His handler was Tom Waltz, a Jewish CIA officer from the CIA station at the US embassy in Tel Aviv. Waltz instructed Amit on which kind of material was needed. Above all, the CIA was interested in Israeli troop movements and intentions in Lebanon and the Palestinian territories. Amit was also alleged to have passed classified information to an unidentified NATO country in Europe. Amit continued spying almost until his arrest.

== Arrest and conviction ==
Shin Bet and the Israel Police began to suspect Amit after one of his friends reported that he had spoken of links with US intelligence.

Amit was arrested in the parking lot of his Haifa apartment building on 24 March 1986. During his interrogation, he made a full confession and provided the names of individuals he had met with, as well as meeting locations and dates, and the payment he had received. When his house was searched, classified military and Shin Bet documents were found. Under questioning, Amit admitted that he had obtained the documents from a childhood friend who worked in Shin Bet, and had persuaded him to give him the documents on grounds that it would assist him in some private investigations. Amit's friend was then arrested and admitted to having given Amit the documents, but expressed remorse and denied knowing that Amit was using them for other purposes. He was subsequently sentenced to a three-month prison term and a one-year suspended sentence, and was fired from Shin Bet.

After a lengthy closed trial in the Haifa District Court, Amit was sentenced to 12 years in prison in April 1987 (at the time 15 years was the maximum sentence). Israeli media was prohibited from mentioning the case by military censorship, while some inaccurate accounts appeared in the non-Israeli press.

== Prison term ==
Amit served his sentence in Ayalon Prison, a maximum-security prison in Ramla. According to a television report, he was held in the prison's psychiatric ward and was allowed visits, while other sources claimed that he was held in solitary confinement for many years.

Yossi Melman wrote in Haaretz in 2021 that Amit was severely tortured in prison, including hospitalization and electric shock treatments in the Mizra mental health hospital near Acre, and his family suffered threats and harassment.

The Israeli Supreme Court rejected an appeal by him in 1989. The case was kept secret on security grounds until June 1993, when the Israeli government allowed the publication of Amit's name, conviction, and sentence in response to a petition from the publishers of Haaretz.

At one point, Israeli officials considered offering to exchange Amit for Jonathan Pollard, a US naval intelligence analyst who had spied for Israel and had been sentenced to life imprisonment in 1987. However, when Amit heard of this, he sent a letter to the State Attorney's Office, stating that he had no desire to be any part of such an exchange, and claimed that his confession had been extracted illegally.

In 1990, while still in prison, Amit sued Yedioth Ahronoth and Maariv for libel over articles those papers had published in 1986 stating that an IDF intelligence major had been convicted of spying for Syria. Although the articles didn't mention Amit by name, Amit contended in his suit that prison guards and fellow inmates had formed the connection, and the false accusation that he had spied for Israel's worst enemy had severely hurt his reputation and led other prisoners to harass him. Like Amit's trial, this case was kept secret until June 1993. Amit dropped the suit in June 1993 after the papers agreed to publish corrections.

During Amit's imprisonment, his father, who died a year before he was released, made repeated unsuccessful attempts to have more details on the case publicized.

In October 1993, Amit was released from prison after serving two-thirds of his sentence. Some sources maintain that he was pardoned by President Ezer Weizman. He was paroled on grounds of good behavior, even though he had often violated prison regulations, and also due to psychological considerations.
