= Sumner Shapiro =

United States Navy Rear Admiral (1926–2006)

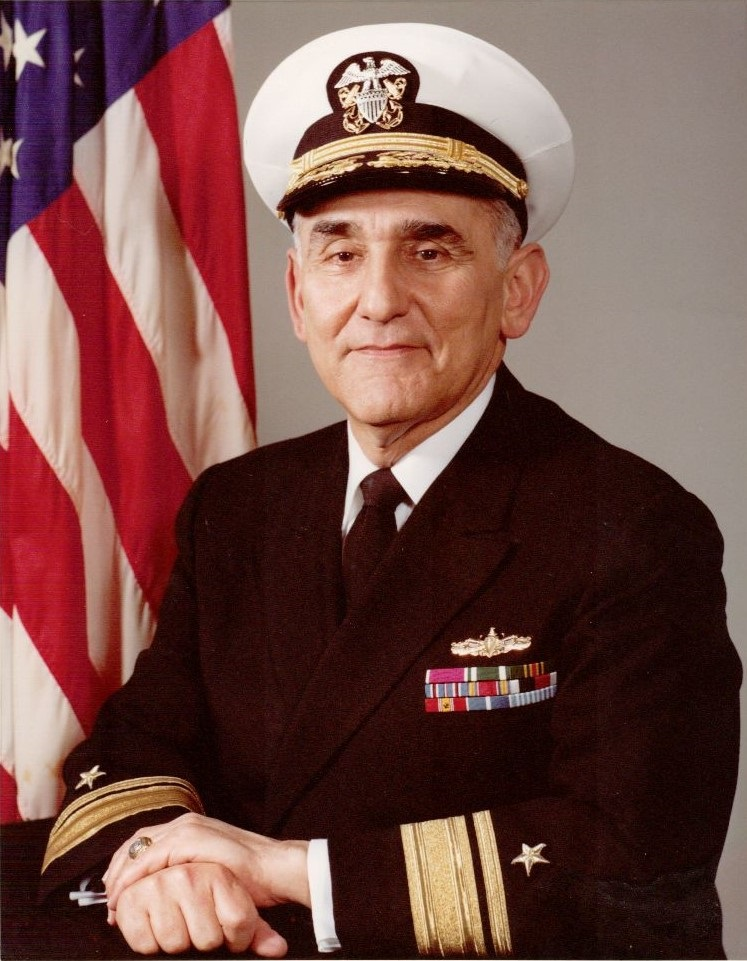
- Born: January 13, 1926; Nashua, New Hampshire, US
- Died: November 14, 2006 (aged 80); McLean, Virginia, US
- Burial place: U.S. Naval Academy
- Spouse: Eleanor Hymen "Jimmie" Shapiro
- Military career
- Allegiance: United States
- Branch: United States Navy
- Service years: 1949–1982
- Rank: Rear Admiral
- Nickname: Shap
- Commands: Naval Intelligence Command; Office of Naval Intelligence
- Conflicts: Korean War
- Awards: Navy Distinguished Service Medal; Legion of Merit; Navy Commendation Medal; National Intelligence Distinguished Service Medal; With Sword, Commander, Naval Order of Merit (Brazil); With Sword, Officer, National Order of Merit (France); Meritorious Unit Commendation; American Theater Medal: Korean Theater Medal; World War II Victory Medal; Navy Occupation Medal; American Defense Medal; United Nations Medal
- Other work: Vice President, BDM

Sumner Shapiro (January 13, 1926 – November 14, 2006) was a United States Navy rear admiral who served as Director of the Office of Naval Intelligence from 1978 to 1982.

== Early life and education ==
Shapiro was born on January 13, 1926 in Nashua, New Hampshire. He attended the University of New Hampshire before serving in World War II with the U.S. Army Air Corps. He graduated from the United States Naval Academy in 1949 and was a veteran of the Korean War. He earned a Master's degree in International Affairs from George Washington University.

== Military career ==
Throughout the 1950s, Shapiro served in the Office of Naval Intelligence, reporting to Chief of Naval Operations Arleigh Burke, as well as serving stints in Moscow and London. He was a graduate of the Naval War College and the U.S. Army's Institute for Advanced Soviet and Eastern European Studies in Germany. He was promoted to Rear Admiral on September 1, 1976 and served simultaneously as D/DNI and commander of Naval Intelligence Command. From 1978 to 1982, he served as the 51st Director of Naval Intelligence.

During his career, Shapiro received the Navy Distinguished Service Medal, the Legion of Merit, and the Navy Commendation Medal. Shapiro had a strong influence on United States Cold War naval strategy.

== Jonathan Pollard ==
Shortly into his career as an intelligence analyst, convicted Israeli spy Jonathan Pollard had his security clearance reduced by Shapiro after presenting a plan to garner intelligence from South Africa. According to The Washington Post, Sumner dismissed Pollard as a "kook". "I wish the hell I'd fired him," Shapiro would later opine.

Shapiro, who was himself Jewish, stated that he was troubled by the support of Jewish organizations for Pollard: "We work so hard to establish ourselves and to get where we are, and to have somebody screw it up... and then to have Jewish organizations line up behind this guy and try to make him out a hero of the Jewish people, it bothers the hell out of me."

Shapiro was among four former directors of Naval intelligence (alongside William Studeman, John Butts and Thomas Brooks) who wrote a livid response to Israeli negotiations to free Pollard, which was published in the Washington Post:

We... feel obligated to go on record with the facts regarding Pollard in order to dispel the myths that have arisen from this clever public relations campaign... aimed at transforming Pollard from greedy, arrogant betrayer of the American national trust into Pollard, committed Israeli patriot

== Personal life ==
Shapiro and his wife Eleanor Hymen "Jimmie" Shapiro are buried at the United States Naval Academy Cemetery.

== Memorials ==
The National Intelligence Professionals society offers a scholarship named for RADM Sumner Shapiro.
