= Pollard railway station =

Former railway station in Victoria, Australia

Pollard

General information
- Coordinates: 36°55′20″S 144°03′37″E
- Line: Shelbourne
- Platforms: 1
- Tracks: 1

Other information
- Status: Closed

History
- Opened: 1891
- Closed: 1970

Services
Preceding station	Disused railways	Following station
Maldon	Shelbourne Line	Shelbourne
	List of closed railway stations in Victoria	
Location

Pollard was a railway station on the Shelbourne line between the townships of Bradford and Nuggetty. It opened with the line on 24 March 1891, and was originally called Bradford Station.

There was a ticket office, shelter and toilets.

There were no sidings at Pollard, so any wagons that needed loading or unloading at the station had to be left on the mainline. Wagons to be left at Pollard were attached behind the guards van when a train left Shelbourne and dropped off at Pollard. The next train to Shelbourne train would propel the wagons to Shelbourne, where they would become included in the consist of the return train.

The station was closed in September 1952. Nothing remains of it today, other than the platform mound.
