= John Pollard =

John Pollard may refer to:

== Politicians ==
- John Pollard (speaker) (died 1557), Speaker of the British House of Commons
- John Pollard (died 1575), MP for Plympton Erle, Barnstaple, Exeter and Grampound
- John Garland Pollard (1871–1937), American politician who served as governor of Virginia, 1930–1934
- John Pollard (politician), former Northwest Territories MLA and Mayor of Hay River

== Others ==
- John Pollard (footballer) (born 1971), English footballer
- John Pollard (mathematician) (born 1941), British mathematician
- John Pollard (priest) (fl. 1544–1554), Archdeacon of Barnstaple
- John Pollard (Royal Navy officer) (1787–1868), credited with killing the Frenchman who shot Nelson
- John Pollard (writer) (1914–2013), English writer
- John Beverly Pollard (1880–1960), US Navy captain and college football player
- John D. Pollard (born 1941), professor of neurology at the University of Sydney
- John F. Pollard (born 1944), British historian
- John W. Pollard (c. 1846 – 1932), American soldier
- J. W. H. Pollard (John William Hobbs Pollard, 1872–1957), American football player and coach
- Red Pollard (John Pollard, 1909–1981), Canadian–American jockey and founding member of the Jockeys' Guild
- Jack Pollard (1926–2002), Australian sportswriter

== See also ==
- Jon Pollard (disambiguation)
- Jonathan Pollard (born 1954), civilian defense analyst convicted of espionage for Israel
- John Pollard Seddon (1827–1906), architect
