= Richard Pollard =

Richard Pollard may refer to:

- Richard Pollard (MP) (fl.1515–1542), English MP
- Dick Pollard (1912–1985), England Test cricketer
- Dick Pollard (footballer) (1913–1966), Australian rules footballer
