= 1985: The Year of the Spy =

Year with most spies arrested in US

The American media referred to 1985 as the Year of the Spy because law enforcement arrested many foreign spies operating on American soil. However, the preceding year, 1984, actually had more arrests for espionage in the United States.

The eight major agents who became infamous in 1985 for espionage against the United States were John Anthony Walker, Richard Kelly Smyth, Sharon Scranage, Larry Wu-Tai Chin, Jonathan Pollard, Ronald Pelton, Randy Miles Jeffries, and Edward Lee Howard.

== Political climate ==
All were charged with spying for Communist nations with the exception of Jonathan Pollard and Sharon Scarange. Their arrests in 1985 heightened tensions between the United States and the Soviet Union at a crucial point in the Cold War; Mikhail Gorbachev rose to power as Soviet general secretary in the same year.

These high-publicity cases added to the American public's suspicion of the Soviets at a time when the Soviet Union was transitioning into new leadership and reforms under Gorbachev. Even Gorbachev's meeting with President Ronald Reagan at the November Geneva Summit did little to reduce uncertainty as to the future of U.S.–Soviet relations.

The arrest of so many foreign spies working within the United States Intelligence Community sparked two demands among the American public: more internal government security and protection against infiltration, and more and better public access to government information.

== Aftermath ==
As a result, journalists and researchers who had been demanding and obtaining government information sought to store it in one central location and in 1985 created the National Security Archive at the Brookings Institution annex at 1755 Massachusetts Ave., NW. Suite 500 in Washington, D.C.

=== John Anthony Walker ===
John Anthony Walker was born on July 28, 1937, in Scranton, Pennsylvania, to Margaret Scaramuzzo and James Vincent Walker. James drank heavily and frequently beat Margaret and their children.

As a child, Walker was a rebellious practical joker. At his Catholic high school, he performed poorly academically and did not participate in sports. When he was 17, he was arrested for robbing a gas station, and he admitted to six other burglaries. In court his older brother, a U.S. Navy petty officer, urged the judge to give him probation so that he might enlist in the Navy and gain discipline.

Walker enlisted in the Navy in 1956.

In 1967, he walked into the Soviet embassy in Washington, D.C. and offered to steal codes, code machines, and classified documents from the Navy for the initial price of $500 to $1,000 per week.

He later recruited his wife Barbara, his friend Jerry Whitworth, his older brother Arthur, and his son Michael to aid him in his espionage activities.

Barbara eventually disclosed the ring's activities to the FBI. After completing a dead drop coordinated with a Soviet operative north of Washington, D.C., Walker searched for $200,000 that the Soviet operative was supposed to have dropped five miles away. He could not find the package, and checked into a local inn to regroup. The FBI had arranged a sting. The hotel's front desk worker lured him from his room at 3:30 a.m. on May 20, 1985, with a phone call about damage to his van in the hotel's parking lot, at which point two FBI agents apprehended him.

The Walker case stunned America as the last major spy case involving Americans was the Julius and Ethel Rosenberg case of the 1950s.

=== Richard Kelly Smyth ===
Richard Kelly Smyth was an American physicist, businessman, and NATO and NASA consultant on aerospace guidance technology. His Huntington Beach, California, business, Milco International Incorporated, was a leading contractor to the U.S. government on aerospace technology and an exporter of this technology. It later became clear that Milco was a front company of Lekem for obtaining sensitive equipment, technologies and materials for Israeli secret defense-related programs, and in particular its nuclear program.

Between January 1980 and December 1982, Smyth allegedly illegally exported 15 shipments of 810 krytrons total to Israeli-intermediary, businessman (and film producer) Arnon Milchan of the Israeli company Heli Trading Company. Milchan then mediated the transfer of the krytrons to the Israeli government.

Because krytrons are electronic switches capable of triggering nuclear explosive devices, the U.S. government deems them munitions and only allows their legal export via a stringent licensing process, though krytrons much smaller than those Smyth exported are central components of common items like copy machines and strobe lights.

Operation Exodus, a US Customs program, was instrumental in Smyth's capture. President Ronald Reagan's administration designed Operation Exodus to cut off smuggling of technology and goods to Soviet countries and funded the program by taking $30 million from the Department of Defense and giving it to Customs.

Smyth was arrested in May 1985 but he fled with his wife while awaiting trial. The couple was discovered in Málaga, Spain in July 2001. After his extradition to the US, he pleaded guilty in December 2001 to violating the Arms Export Control Act and to making false statements to US Customs. His sentence included 40 months in prison and a $20,000 fine, though he was immediately eligible for parole because of his age. He was 72 at the time of sentencing.

The high drama of the covert relationship between Smyth, Hollywood producer Arnon Milchan, and the entire episode that became known as the Krytron Affair, was documented in the 2011 book Confidential, The Life of Secret Agent Turned Hollywood Tycoon Arnon Milchan.

=== Sharon Scranage ===
Sharon Scranage was a young American CIA secretary serving in Accra, the capital of Ghana. The Ghanaian government used Michael Agbotui Soussoudis, a young male intelligence officer to target her, romance her, and solicit U.S. intelligence from her.

Scranage disclosed to Soussoudis the identities of CIA informants in Ghana as well as plans for a coup against the Ghanaian government by dissidents. Soussoudis then passed the information to Ghanaian intelligence chief and Marxist Kojo Tsikata, who then passed it to Cuba, Libya, and East Germany. Eight Ghanaian citizens who had been spying for the CIA were arrested and one was allegedly killed.

According to a study by the Adjudicative Desk Reference, the U.S. government's guidelines for a person's eligibility for access to classified information, it is not uncommon for foreign intelligence agents, especially in Communist nations, to use the promise of sex and romance against operatives to gain trust and obtain information.

On September 27, 1985 Scranage began her sentence of five years in prison for espionage and violating the Intelligence Identities Protection Act, legislation that made it illegal to disclose the identities of or personal information about intelligence officers. She earned parole after serving 18 months. Soussoudis received a sentence of 20 years but permanently left the U.S. in exchange for a suspended sentence.

=== Larry Wu-Tai Chin ===
Larry Wu-Tai Chin was born in Beijing. He began his U.S. government career as translator for the U.S. Army during World War II. He performed the same job for the U.S. consulate in Shanghai, the State Department, and the CIA's Foreign Broadcast Information Service.

He spied for China for 30 years. He told the Chinese government Richard Nixon's secret diplomatic goals before Nixon's visit to China, and China was able to strategically prepare for negotiations. Chinese intelligence agents then passed Chin's secrets on to the Vietnamese.

China paid Chin between $500,000 and $1 million, with which he accumulated 29 rental properties and Las Vegas gambling debts totaling more than $96,000. Chin channeled his compulsive gambling habit and used it as a way to hide his espionage profits.

After federal district judge Robert Mehrige found him guilty of spying for China on February 7, 1986, Chin suffocated himself with a plastic bag in his Virginia prison cell.

=== Jonathan Pollard ===
Jonathan Pollard grew up in South Bend, Indiana. His family lost 70 relatives during the Holocaust, and he dreamed of avenging these wrongs. He attended Stanford University where he falsely boasted that Israeli intelligence paid his tuition and his father worked for the CIA.

After leaving graduate school at Tufts University, he became a civilian U.S. Naval intelligence officer in 1979. He earned a promotion in 1984 and immediately passed satellite imagery and CIA reports to Israeli agents, unsolicited. Apart from cash, he received jewelry and a honeymoon on the Orient Express for his wife Anne Henderson.

Pollard reportedly admitted to selling materials that could fill a 10-foot by 6-foot by 6-foot space to Israeli intelligence, from where, it is claimed some intelligence specialists believe that the Soviet moles then passed those secrets along to Moscow.

Pollard's need to constantly handle classified materials drew too much attention, and he was arrested by the FBI on November 18, 1985. He pleaded guilty to espionage and received a sentence of life in prison on June 4, 1986. After Anne served her 5-year sentence for unauthorized possession of government documents, she divorced Pollard.

In April 2008, federal prosecutors accused 84-year-old retired U.S. Army engineer and New Jersey resident Ben-Ami Kadish of passing intelligence to an Israeli official who also received information from Pollard.

=== Ronald Pelton ===
Ronald Pelton was born in 1942. After attending Indiana University, he joined the U.S. Air Force and analyzed SIGINT in Pakistan. He had a photographic memory.

He began working for the National Security Agency as a communications specialist in 1966. He personally went to the Soviet embassy in Washington, D.C. and volunteered to spy after he retired in 1979.

He eventually disclosed to the Soviets intelligence about Operation Ivy Bells, a plan to monitor underwater Soviet communication cables. At the time, the information Pelton had disclosed was so sensitive that CIA director William Casey and NSA director William Odom asked the media to report any leaked information to them before going to press.

Alleged Soviet defector Vitaly Yurchenko was a KGB colonel who revealed Pelton's identity during an interrogation by the CIA.

Pelton received three concurrent life sentences in 1986.

=== Randy Miles Jeffries ===
Randy Miles Jeffries worked as a clerk for the FBI from 1978 to 1980. In 1983 he received a one-year suspended sentence for heroin possession and attended rehab. A social service worker referred him to Acme Reporting Company, a stenography and reporting company that frequently contracted with federal agencies. Here Jeffries was responsible for photocopying, bundling, and handling classified documents and later disposing of them, unshredded, in a dumpster.

On December 14, 1985, Jeffries conspired with a coworker to attempt to sell to the Soviet Military Office in northwest Washington three classified documents including one titled “US House of Representatives, Department of Defense Command Control Communication and Intelligence Programs, C31, Closed Session, Subcommittee on Armed Services, Washington, D.C.” At 4:45 p.m. he hand-delivered sample documents to the Soviet Military Office. He returned on December 17, at which time Soviet agents paid him $60. On December 20 he met with an undercover FBI agent who was posing as a Soviet. Law enforcement arrested Jeffries later that night.

A subsequent federal audit of Acme Reporting Company revealed that their security system was a total failure. Background checks were inadequate, employees worked on classified materials from home, and no proper document destruction procedures were in place.

In response to the Jeffries case, the Defense Investigative Service started Project Insight in 1986 to gather and analyze industrial security data and develop recommendations for new techniques.

On March 13, 1986, a federal judge sentenced Jeffries to 3 to 9 years imprisonment.

=== Edward Lee Howard ===
Edward Lee Howard was a Boy Scout, an altar boy, and a returned Peace Corps volunteer who served in Colombia. After a period spent doing international development work with USAID, Howard went to work for the CIA in 1981.

On May 2, 1983, the CIA fired him after noting discrepancies in his polygraph tests regarding past drug use and petty theft. Howard promptly made drunken phone calls to the U.S. embassy in Moscow using a phone line he knew Soviets were monitoring, and thereby exposed his former supervisor as a CIA employee.

In 1984 Howard allegedly sold U.S. intelligence to KGB agents in Austria. In 1985 he vanished into the New Mexico desert after Soviet defector and KGB deputy chief Vitaly Yurchenko gave the FBI information which caused them to heavily surveil Howard. He escaped with the help of his wife Mary, who drove home from the desert with a dummy decoy in the passenger seat of the car, and played a recording of Howard's voice on a phone line she knew the FBI was tapping.

Howard defected to Russia where the Soviets granted him asylum, an apartment, and a new identity.

Howard died on July 12, 2002, at the age of 50, according to former KGB chief Vladimir A. Kryuchkov and State Department spokesman Richard A. Boucher.

== See also ==
- Espionage Act of 1917
