= Lekem =

Defunct Israeli intelligence agency

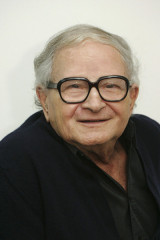
Rafi Eitan

Lekem, (also pronounced "Lakam") an acronym for ha-Lishka le-Kishrei Mada (Hebrew: הלשכה לקשרי מדע, Bureau of Scientific Relations), was an Israeli intelligence agency headed by Benjamin Blumberg (1957–1981), and Rafi Eitan (1981–1986). It collected scientific and technical intelligence abroad from both open and covert sources, particularly for Israel's nuclear program. It was disbanded in 1986 following the arrest of Jonathan Pollard for espionage on behalf of Israel. Pollard was a United States Navy intelligence employee in the Naval Antiterrorist Alert Center in Washington, D.C. He was paid for delivering large amounts of classified documents to Lekem agents. Pollard was convicted and sentenced to life imprisonment.

The high-profile Pollard case was not the only problematic case for Lekem in 1985. In California, a US aerospace engineer, Richard Kelly Smyth, the president of a company called MILCO, was indicted that same year for smuggling over 800 krytron switches (a component used in nuclear weapons) to Israel without the required US State Department Munitions Export License. Just before trial, and facing a possible 105 years in prison, Richard Kelly Smyth and his wife suddenly disappeared. Sixteen years later they were discovered and arrested while living as fugitives in Málaga, Spain, and extradited back to the United States where he was convicted in the case. The krytrons shipped by Smyth were sent to an Israeli company called Heli-Trading Ltd. owned by notable Israeli movie producer Arnon Milchan. Before his prominent Hollywood career, Milchan had served for decades as a Lekem agent, under the direct command of Lekem spy-master Benjamin Blumberg. It later became clear that the company MILCO served as a Lekem front company for obtaining sensitive equipment, technologies, and materials for Israeli secret defense-related programs, and in particular its nuclear program.

The Israeli government asserted that the Krytron incident was a simple mistake by the "exporter" MILCO, and that the Pollard operation was an unauthorized deviation from its policy of not conducting espionage in the United States, before an admission in 1998 of Israeli responsibility. In 1987 the Israeli government set up a commission to investigate the Pollard affair, which found it would be in Israel's interest to take responsibility for the case. In 1987 following the difficult Pollard and MILCO cases, the Israeli government decided to disband Lekem, whose functions were assigned to the Director of Security of the Defense Establishment, adding technical and scientific intelligence to its responsibilities, which include internal investigations of the defense ministry.
