= Miriam David =

Educator, academic (born 1945)

Miriam David FRSA, FAcSS
- Born: 9 August 1945 (age 81)
- Education: University of Leeds; University of London
- Occupation: Educator
- Employer: Institute of Education
- Title: Associate Director of Teaching and Learning Research Programme

Miriam E. David FRSA FAcSS (born 9 August 1945) is a British educator. She was Professor of Education at the Institute of Education, University of London and associate director of the Teaching and Learning Research Programme.

== Education and career ==
David earned a BA (Hons) degree in sociology in 1966 from the University of Leeds. In 1975, she earned her Ph.D. in economics of education from the University of London. From 1988 - 1997 she taught at London South Bank University, and from 1997 - 1999 at University of the Arts. In 1993, she was elected Fellow of the Royal Society of Arts (RSA), and in 1999 she was Elected Academician of the Academy of Learned Societies in the Social Sciences (AcSS).

David has held the following recent major positions:

- 1998–2005 – Visiting Professorial Fellow, Institute of Education.
- 2002–2004 – Director of the Graduate School of Social Sciences, Keele University.
- 2004–2005 – Research Dean, Faculty of Humanities and Social Sciences, Keele University.
- 1999–2005 – Visiting professor of Policy Studies in Education, Keele University.
- 2004–2006 – Professor of Education, Institute of Education, The School of Educational Foundations and Policy Studies.
- 2007 (March–April) – ESRC/SSRC Fellowship as visiting professor at Harvard University, Graduate School of Education, Ontario Institute for Studies in Education, University of Toronto, University of Wisconsin–Madison, Faculty of Education.
- 2004–2008 – Associate Director, Teaching and Learning Research Programme

David is currently Professor Emerita at the Institute of Education.

== Collections ==
The Institute of Education, University College London holds David's archive relating to her academic work. The collection contains correspondence, papers, talks, and research papers. David donated the material in 2010.
