= Teaching and Learning Research Programme =

TLRP-TEL Stand at the Artificial Intelligence in Education Conference 2009, in Brighton, UK

The Teaching and Learning Research Programme (TLRP) was the United Kingdom's largest investment in education research. It was initiated in 2000, ended in 2011 and was managed on behalf of the Higher Education Funding Councils by the Economic and Social Research Council. The programme engaged 700 researchers in some 70 major projects. These covered all education sectors - from Early Years to Higher Education and Workplace Learning. The TLRP researchers work closely in partnership with practitioners to ensure the relevance and application of findings to policy and practice. Thematic work across the diverse range of projects enabled analysis of themes and the identification of 'ten principles for effective teaching and learning'.

During the project an interest emerged in Technology-Enhanced Learning (TEL). It began with a call for proposals in 2006, additional funding having been made available by the Engineering and Physical Sciences Research Council.

From 1995 to 2011, the Teaching and Learning Research programme was based at the Institute of Education, University of London. Prior to this, it was managed from the University of Exeter and University of Cambridge.

== Teaching and Learning Research Programme generic phase: 2000–2009 ==
=== Objectives ===
The programme acknowledges the important contributions provided by research on teaching and learning. The TLRP's aims, according to its website include :

- Learning - The TLRP conducts research with the potential to improve outcomes for learners in a very wide range of UK contexts across the lifecourse. The Programme explores synergies between different research approaches and aims to build UK capacity in conducting high quality educational research.
- Outcomes - TLRP studies a broad range of learning outcomes. These include both the acquisition of skill, understanding, knowledge and qualifications and the development of attitudes, values and identities relevant to a learning society.
- Lifecourse - TLRP supports research projects on many ages and stages in education, training and lifelong learning. The Programme is concerned with patterns of success and difference, inclusion and exclusion through the lifecourse.
- Enrichment - The TLRP is committed to engaging users in its work. It works in all disciplines and sectors of education and uses a wide range of appropriate methodology. We cooperate with other researchers within and beyond the UK whenever it is appropriate.
- Expertise - TLRP works to enhance capacity for all forms of research on teaching and learning, and for research-informed policy and practice.
- Improvement - The TLRP works to develop the UK knowledge base on teaching and learning and to make sure that the knowledge it develops is applied in practice and policy.

==== Strategy ====
There were six strategic commitments underpinning the programme's overall development:

- User engagement for relevance and quality
- Knowledge generation by project teams
- Knowledge synthesis through thematic activities
- Knowledge transformation for impact
- Capacity building for professional development
- Partnerships for sustainability

=== Projects ===
TLRP's projects covered a broad range of topics within the following areas of the lifecourse:

- Early Years
- Primary Education
- Secondary Education
- Across School Phases
- Further and Post-16 Education
- Higher Education
- Workplace Learning
- Professional Learning
- Lifelong Learning
- Technology Enhanced Learning

=== Management ===
Strategic management of the programme was conducted via a steering committee. This comprised academics, practitioners and other users and was chaired by Professor Robert Burgess, Vice-Chancellor of the University of Leicester. The steering committee was accountable to the ESRC Council.

==== Director's Team ====
The Director's Team possessed expert knowledge of all the key sectors in which research is currently being conducted. The final team was:

- Professor Andrew Pollard, Programme Director
- Professor Mary James, Deputy Director
- Professor Miriam David, Associate Director
- Professor Alan Brown, Associate Director

== TLRP Technology Enhanced Learning phase: 2006–2011 ==
=== Objectives ===
According to its website, the Technology Enhanced Learning research has specific concern with:

- Productivity – Achieving higher quality and more effective learning in affordable and acceptable ways
- Personalisation – Transforming the quality of learning, by matching technology with learners' needs
- Inclusion – Improving the reach of education and lifelong learning to groups and individuals
- Flexibility – Enabling more open, variable, and accessible learning

=== Projects ===
Under the first phase of the TLRP-TEL programme, seven development projects were funded during 2006-2007.

The programme funded eight large, interdisciplinary projects under its second phase:

- A Learning Design Support Environment (LDSE) for Teachers and Lecturers
- Echoes 2: Improving Children’s Social Interaction through Exploratory Learning in a Multimodal Environment
- Ensemble: Semantic Technologies for the Enhancement of Case-Based Learning
- Inter-Life: Interoperability and Transition
- MiGen: Intelligent Support for Mathematical Generalisation
- hapTEL: Enhancing Learning through Haptics
- Personal Inquiry (PI): Designing for Evidence-based Enquiry across Formal and Informal Settings of Learning
- SynergyNet: Supporting Collaborative Learning in an Immersive Environment

=== Management ===
The Director of TLRP-TEL was Professor Richard Noss.

== See also ==
- Special education in the United Kingdom
