= Polland =

Polland is a surname. Notable people with the surname include:

- David Polland (born 1908), American chess master
- Eddie Polland (born 1947), Northern Irish golfer
- Madeleine A. Polland (1918–2005), prolific Irish children's author
- Milton Rice Polland (1909–2006), American businessman and political activist
- Pamela Polland (born 1944), American singer-songwriter
- Willie Polland (1934–2010), Scottish footballer

== See also ==
- Poland (surname)
