= Robert Pollard (disambiguation) =

Robert Pollard (born 1957) is an American singer-songwriter, lead singer of Guided by Voices.

Robert Pollard may also refer to:

- Robert Pollard (American football) (born 1981), American football defensive end
- Robert Pollard (engraver) (1755–1838), English engraver and painter
- Robert Nelson Pollard (1880–1954), United States federal judge
- Bob Pollard (born 1948), American football player
- Bob Pollard (footballer) (1899–after 1933), English footballer
