= Charles Pollard =

Charles or Charlie Pollard may refer to:

- Charles Pollard (footballer) (born 1973), Guyana footballer
- Charlie Pollard (1897–1968), English rugby league footballer for Wakefield Trinity and Great Britain

== See also ==
- Charles Pollard Olivier (1884–1975), American astronomer
