= Frederick Pollard =

Frederick Pollard may refer to:

- Fred G. Pollard (1918–2003), American lawyer and Virginian politician
- Fritz Pollard (1894–1986), American football player and coach
- Fritz Pollard, Jr. (1915–2003), American Olympic hurdler, son of Fritz Pollard
