= Shelbourne railway line =

Railway line in Victoria, Australia

Shelbourne

Overview
- Status: Closed
- Former connections: Maldon line
- Stations: 2

Service
- Type: Branch

History
- Opened: 24 March 1891
- Closed: 8 January 1969 as wooden bridges were destroyed by bushfire

Technical
- Number of tracks: 1

The Shelbourne railway line was a continuation of the branch line from Castlemaine to Maldon in Victoria.

Due to the facing junction of the Shelbourne extension, when services to Shelbourne reached Maldon, the locomotive had to change ends in order to run from there to Shelbourne.

== History ==
The line from Maldon to Shelbourne was opened on 24 March 1891. The line was originally planned to extend about 8 miles (13 km) beyond Shelbourne to Laanecoorie, but work on that section was suspended in 1890. Almost 2 miles (3 km) of earthworks and two trestle bridges had been built before construction was abandoned.

The one intermediate station on the line was called Bradford until May 1919, when its name was altered to Pollard. In late 1936, a proposal to close the Castlemaine-Maldon-Shelbourne line was met with protests. Consequently, the line was not closed, but services were modified such that some rolling stock was allocated to the Echuca line.

== Closure ==
A bushfire on 8 January 1969 destroyed a number of the wooden trestle bridges between Maldon and Shelbourne, which were deemed uneconomical to rebuild, forcing the closure of the line.
