= Hugh Pollard =

Hugh Pollard may refer to:

- Hugh Pollard (actor) (born 1975), British child actor
- Hugh Pollard (intelligence officer) (1888–1966), British intelligence officer
- Hugh Pollard (sheriff) (fl. 1536, 1545), English sheriff in Devon, son of Lewis Pollard
- Sir Hugh Pollard, 2nd Baronet (1603–1666), English soldier and MP
- Hugh Pollard, founding principal of St Martin's College, Lancaster
