= Ernest Pollard =

Ernest Pollard may refer to:

- Ernest Pollard (rugby league) (1910–?), English rugby league footballer
- Ernest C. Pollard (1906–1997), British-American atomic physicist and biophysicist
- Ernest M. Pollard (1869–1939), Nebraska representative
