= Harry Pollard (photographer) =

Canadian photographer

- Born: Harry Pollard; 1880; Tillsonburg, Ontario, Canada.
- Died: 1968 (aged 87–88)
- Occupations: photographer businessman

Harry Pollard (1880–1968) was a Canadian photographer known for his photographs of First Nations peoples in Western Canada.

== Career ==
Pollard was born in 1880 in Tillsonburg, Ontario. His father, James, was a photographer. In May 1899, Pollard moved to Calgary where he opened a photography studio. Among his most notable photographs are those documenting the First Nations of the Blackfoot Confederacy living in Canada – the Tsuu T'ina Nation, the Siksika Nation and the Kainai Nation.

In 1924, Pollard was press photographer for Associated Screen News, a subsidiary of Canadian Pacific Railway. He was hired to take promotional pictures of ocean cruises, and his job took him around the world 14 times. The Harry Pollard photograph collection is in the Provincial Archives of Alberta, having been acquired by the provincial government in 1964.

== Personal life ==
Pollard was married Eleanor Tillen, who was named Miss Canada in 1908. Together they had five children – Harry, William, Laura, Martha and Helen. Pollard died at the age of 87 on 9 July 1968.
