= Doug Pollard =

Canadian soccer player

Personal information
- Date of birth: 28 August 1957 (age 69)
- Place of birth: London, Ontario, Canada
- Position: Defender

Senior career*
Years	Team	Apps	(Gls)
1975	Ontario Selects		
1975	London City		
1976	Windsor Stars		
1977–1978	Windsor Stars		
1978–1980	New York Arrows (indoor)	43	(11)
1979	Rochester Lancers	3	(0)
1980–1981	Hartford Hellions (indoor)	21	(9)
1983	Windsor Croatia		
- * Club domestic league appearances and goals

Doug Pollard (born August 28, 1957) is a Canadian former soccer player who played as a defender.

== Career ==
Pollard played in the National Soccer League in 1975 with London City and the Ontario Selects. The following season he played with Windsor Stars, but was released on July 12, 1976. In 1977, under new head coach Ivan Marković he re-signed with Windsor for the 1977 season. He played another season with Windsor in 1978. In the winter of 1978 he played indoor soccer in the Major Indoor Soccer League with New York Arrows.

In 1979, he played in the North American Soccer League with Rochester Lancers. In the winter of 1979 he resumed playing with the New York Arrows. In 1980 he played with Hartford Hellions. In 1983, he played in the Windsor and District Soccer League with Windsor Croatia.
