= Steven John Lalas =

American spy (born 1953)

Steven John Lalas (born 1953) is an American former State Department communications officer. Born in Rochester, New Hampshire, he was active as a spy against the United States from 1977–93 when he was charged with espionage-related offenses in connection with passing sensitive military and diplomatic information to Greece. He was arrested in the United States through an Federal Bureau of Investigation (FBI) sting operation.

Lalas pled guilty in federal court to one count of conspiracy to commit espionage, he was sentenced to 14 years in prison. Later paroled, Lalas emigrated to Greece to serve out the remainder of his parole.

== Spying activities ==
During his active years as a spy, Lalas passed an estimated 700 highly classified documents, that included U.S. gathered intelligence information of Turkish military strategy in the Aegean Sea and Cyprus, and U.S. diplomatic assessments and views on the Republic of North Macedonia. Athens was Lalas' fourth communications posting with the State Department. He also served at posts in İzmir (where he was allegedly recruited by the Greeks), Belgrade, Istanbul, and Taiwan. U.S. investigators claimed he made an average of US$24,000 over a two-year period by providing documents, thus earning a steady income selling Defense Intelligence Agency reports about troop strength, political analyses, and military discussions contained in cables between the U.S. Embassy in Athens and the White House. He also obtained information from FBI communications about counterterrorism efforts, and the names and job descriptions of CIA personnel stationed overseas.

== Lalas' apprehension ==
According to the U.S. government, it received the first tip that led to identification of Lalas as a spy as a result of an accidental slip in a conversation between an official of the Greek Embassy in Washington and a State Department official. The Greek official knew of information that could only have come from a secret communication between the U.S. Embassy in Athens and the State Department. The State Department official recognized something wasn't right and reported it. This led to an FBI secret investigation, and Lalas was later observed through a video monitoring system stealing documents intended for destruction, taking them out of the US embassy and handing them over to his Greek liaison.

Also according to U.S. authorities, Lalas originally claimed he had been recruited by Greek military officials in 1991, and that he feared for the welfare of relatives living in Greece if he had not cooperated. Authorities later discovered that he began spying for the Greek government in 1977 while with the U.S. Army.

== Trial and sentence ==
In June 1993, Lalas pleaded guilty to one count of conspiracy to commit espionage and on September 16 was sentenced to 14 years in federal prison without possibility of parole. Prosecutors had recommended the 14-year sentence in return for Lalas’ promise to reveal what documents he turned over and to whom.

The full extent of his espionage activity was confirmed prior to his sentencing only after he failed two FBI polygraph examinations. Yet in debriefings the prosecutors said Lalas did not reveal the full extent of his spying.

== Later events ==
Lalas was on parole until July 2010. He returned to Greece on November 25, 2007, after written assurances from Greek Justice Minister Sotiris Hadjigakis that the Greek government would fulfill any U.S. court decision regarding Lalas' parole.

The Greek intelligence community regard him as the most important agent they had ever recruited in the past half of the 20th century.

As for Lalas himself, even though the Greek government did not support him or his family in Greece when he was arrested, he continued to praise his country of descent while in prison. In his appearances in Alexis Papahelas' show Oi Fakeloi, he stated that if he had the chance he would do it all over again, even if he was to be arrested and spend another 14 years in prison separated from his wife and two kids. He also publicly denies that he ever received any money, and insists that his motivation was only inspired by patriotic feelings for Greece.
