= Ben-Ami Kadish =

US army mechanic and spy for Israel

Ben Ami Kadish
- Born: September 2, 1923; Connecticut, United States
- Died: July 16, 2012 (aged 88); Plainsboro Township, New Jersey, United States
- Resting place: Beth Israel Cemetery, Woodbridge
- Occupation: Mechanical engineer
- Employer: United States Army Armament Research, Development and Engineering Center
- Known for: Espionage conviction
- Criminal charges: Espionage
- Criminal penalty: Fine of $50,000
- Criminal status: Convicted
- Spouse: Dorris

Ben-Ami Kadish (September 2, 1923 – July 16, 2012) was a former U.S. Army mechanical engineer. He pleaded guilty in December 2008 to being an "unregistered agent for Israel," and admitted to disclosing classified U.S. documents to Israel in the 1980s. His unauthorized disclosure of classified U.S. secrets to Israel was concurrent with the espionage activity of Jonathan Pollard, who was convicted of espionage and answered to the same Israeli handler.

== Life ==
Ben-Ami Kadish was born in Connecticut but grew up in what was Mandatory Palestine. As a young man he fought with the Haganah. He also served in the British military with the Jewish Brigade for one year and in the United States Army Air Forces for three years. Following military service, he attended Northeastern University and graduated with a degree in mechanical engineering. When he retired in January 1990, he was a supervisory engineer in the Fuze Division of the Army Armament Research, Development and Engineering Center.

He resided with his wife Dorris in a Monroe Township, Middlesex County, New Jersey retirement community. Ben-Ami Kadish died at University Medical Center of Princeton, Plainsboro and was interred in Beth Israel Cemetery, Woodbridge.

== Conspiracy charges ==
Kadish was employed as a mechanical engineer by the United States Army Armament Research, Development and Engineering Center at the Picatinny Arsenal in Dover, New Jersey from October 1963 to January 1990. Kadish conspired to disclose national defense-related documents to Israel and worked as an agent of the Israeli government from 1979 to 1985. Kadish took classified documents to his handler's home in Riverdale, Bronx several times (including information about nuclear weapons, a modified F-15 fighter, and the Patriot missiles) and let an unnamed Israeli government worker take photographs of them.

Yosef Yagur, Kadish's Israeli handler, along with his Israeli Embassy counterpart Ilan Ravid, fled the US in 1985 after another agent they were running, civilian intelligence intelligence analyst Jonathan Pollard, was arrested for espionage. According to court documents, Kadish and Yagur continued to remain in contact, up to a month before his arrest in 2008.

Kadish was arrested by the FBI in 2008 and charged with four counts: one count of conspiring to disclose documents related to the national defense of the United States to the Government of Israel; one count of conspiring to act as an agent of the Government of Israel; one count of conspiring to hinder a communication to a law enforcement officer; and one count of conspiring to make a materially false statement to a law enforcement officer.

== Guilty plea ==
In December 2008, Kadish pleaded guilty to acting as an unregistered agent of Israel, admitting he gave classified documents to Israel in the 1980s. Prosecutors asserted that Kadish had furnished classified American secrets to Yosef Yagur, the same Israeli agent who had received secret documents from Pollard.

In determining the sentence, Judge William H. Pauley III asserted, "Why it took the government 23 years to charge Mr. Kadish is shrouded in mystery." Pauley stated that prison would "serve no purpose" for a man of Kadish's advanced age and infirmity, opting to levy a $50,000 fine against Kadish. The prosecutor stated that the decision to accept the plea agreement was based on Kadish's cooperation and his willingness to admit wrongdoing. Prior to sentencing, Kadish faced the judge while standing with the aid of a cane; he said, "I'm sorry I made a mistake ... It was a misjudgment. I thought I was helping the state of Israel without harming the United States."

== Death ==
On July 16, 2012, a funeral home death notice in New Jersey revealed that Kadish died at the age 85. The notice also stated that no date or cause of his death was made public.
