= Andrew Pollard (educator) =

British professor of education (1949-)

Andrew Pollard (born 1949) is an emeritus professor at the Institute of Education, University College London. Formerly, he was Professor of Education at the universities of Cambridge, Bristol and the West of England, Bristol. He chaired the Education Sub-panel for the 2014 Research Excellence Framework on behalf of UK Higher Education Funding Councils, which involves assessing the quality of research undertaken in UK universities. He was Director of the ESRC Teaching and Learning Research Programme from 2002 to 2009, of the UK Strategic Forum for Research in Education from 2008 to 2011 and of ESCalate, the Education Subject Centre of the UK's Higher Education Academy. He is a non-executive director of William Pollard & Co. Ltd. a print and communications company, founded in 1781 and based in Exeter.

He received his BA in Sociology and Economics from the University of Leeds, PGCE in Education from the University of Lancaster, M.Ed from the University of Sheffield and PhD in the Sociology of Education from the University of Sheffield. He has an honorary doctorate from the University of Edinburgh and is an Emeritus Fellow of Wolfson College, Cambridge.

As a former school teacher, Pollard's research interests include teaching-learning processes and learner perspectives, as well as the development of evidence-based classroom practice. He is responsible for a series of textbooks and support materials on reflective teaching within primary and secondary schooling.

He has worked on the effects of national and institutional policies on learning, including on the impact work of TLRP, focusing project findings on contemporary issues in lifelong and workplace learning, higher and further education and in schooling. Previously, he co-directed the Primary, Assessment, Curriculum and Experience project (PACE) tracking the impact of education legislation on practices in English primary school classrooms. This research developed into the Identity and Learning Programme (ILP), a longitudinal ethnographic study of the interaction of identity, learning, assessment, career and social differentiation in children's experiences of schooling from age 4 to 16. During 2011, he was part of an Expert Panel advising, and challenging, the English government on a Review of the National Curriculum.

Pollard has worked with schools and local authorities including UK education agencies and funding bodies such as ESRC, Training and Development Agency for Schools TDA, QCA, the Esmee Fairbairn Foundation and HEFCE.

== Publications ==
- Reflective Teaching in Schools, London: Bloomsbury (2014)
- Readings for Reflective Teaching in Schools, London: Bloomsbury (2014)
- The Framework for the National Curriculum: a report by the Expert Panel Department for Education, London (2011)
- Professionalism and Pedagogy: a contemporary opportunity, A TLRP Commentary (2010)
- Reflective Teaching, 3rd ed., London: Continuum (with contributors) (2008)
- Principles into Practice: a teacher's guide to research evidence on teaching and learning, TLRP, London (2007)
- Teaching and Learning in Schools, A TLRP Commentary (edited with Mary James) (2006)
- Learning and Teaching Where Worldviews Meet, Stoke-on-Trent: Trentham (2002)
- Readings for Reflective Teaching, 2nd ed., London: Continuum (2002)
- Policy, Practice and Teacher Experience: Changing English Primary Education, London: Continuum (2000)
- Policy, Practice and Pupil Experience: Changing English Primary Education, London: Continuum (2000)
- The Social World of Pupil Assessment: Processes and Contexts in Primary Schooling, London: Cassell (2000)
- The Social World of Pupil Careers: Strategic Biographies through Primary School, London: Cassell (1999)
- Reflective Teaching in Secondary Education, London: Cassell (1997)
- Work and Identity in the Primary School: A Post-Fordist Analysis, Buckingham: Open University Press (1996)
- Teachers, Pupils and Primary Schooling London: Cassell (1996)
- Children and Their Curriculum, London: Falmer (1996)
- Readings for Reflective Teaching in the Primary School, London: Cassell (1996)
- An Introduction to Primary Education, London: Cassell (1996)
- The Social World of Children's Learning; Case Studies of Pupils from Four to Seven, (1996)
- Changing English Primary Schools? The Impact of the National Curriculum and Assessment, London: Cassell (1994)
- Look Before You Leap? Research for the National Curriculum at Key Stage Two, London: Tufnell Press (1994)
- Reflective Teaching in the Primary School, 2nd ed., London: Cassell (1993)
- Teaching and Learning in the Primary School, London: Routledge (1993)
- Assessment for Learning in Primary Schools A School Development Programme, Bristol: Redland Centre for Primary Education (1990)
- Learning in Primary Schools, London: Cassell (1990)
- Education, Training and the New Vocationalism: Experience and Policy, Milton Keynes: Open University Press (1988)
- Sociology and Teaching: A New Challenge for the Sociology of Education, London: Croom Helm (1988)
- Reflective Teaching in the Primary School, London: Cassell (1987)
- Children and Their Primary Schools, London: Falmer Press (1987)
- The Social World of the Primary School, London: Holt, Rinehart and Winston (1985)
