= Dick Pollard (footballer) =

Australian rules footballer (1913–1966)

Personal information
- Full name: Allan William Pollard
- Born: 25 June 1913; Korumburra, Victoria
- Died: 10 November 1966 (aged 53); Repatriation General Hospital, Heidelberg, Victoria

Playing career^{1}
Years	Club	Games (Goals)
1934–35	Footscray	25 (22)
- ^{1} Playing statistics correct to the end of 1935.

Allan William "Dick" Pollard (25 June 1913 – 10 November 1966) was an Australian rules footballer who played with Footscray in the Victorian Football League (VFL).

== Family ==
The son of Joseph William Pollard (1871–1940) and Alice Sophia Pollard (1877–1947), née Jones, Allan William Pollard was born at Korumburra, Victoria, on 25 June 1913.

He married Heather May Jones (1910–1998) in Leongatha, in 1941.

== Football ==
Cleared from Maffra to Footscray in May 1934.

== Cricket ==
He was also a well-performed cricketer.

== Military service ==
Pollard later served in the Australian Army during World War II.

== Death ==
He died at the Repatriation General Hospital, in Heidelberg, Victoria, on 10 November 1966.
