= Deana Pollard Sacks =

Deana Pollard Sacks (born 1964) is a legal educator, author, and professor of law at Texas Southern University. She was born in Tacoma and was educated at Gig Harbor High School, the University of Washington (B.A.), the University of Southern California (J.D.), and the University of California-Berkeley (LL.M.).

Sacks's scholarship centers around issues of gender and race. Her most prominent articles are on the legal regulation of pornography, the imposition of tort liability for failure to disclose material details in dating relationships (such as marital status and the presence of sexually transmitted diseases), producer liability for violent video games, implicit racial and gender bias in the legal system, and the movement to ban corporal punishment.

In recent years her work on sex torts and on corporal punishment has been cited in briefs and in court opinions as those issues have been increasingly litigated. In 2014, Professor Sacks started a grass-roots independent talk show in Malibu, California, Meet The Professors, for the purpose of bringing social science information directly to the public, such as information concerning the effects of media on the brain and behavior, implicit racial bias, and sexual culture. She is the author of two books in a series titled, The Godfathers of Sex Abuse. Book I: Jeffrey Epstein (2019) details Epstein's rise to wealth and his pyramid-style sex trafficking ring, as well as his lawyers' and U.S. attorneys' manipulation of the legal system and the mass media's failure to report the truth about Jeffrey Epstein and his relationships with famous and powerful people such as Bill Gates, the Clintons, Prince Andrew, and many others. Book II: Harvey Weinstein, Bill Cosby, #MeToo (2020) details the modi operandi of Weinstein and Cosby, including the lawyers' misconduct and the inaccurate news reports surrounding these predators and their many accusers. Book II also presents an academic analysis of the problems with the American court system and culture that allow sexual abuse to continue, and offers suggestions for fundamental changes to sexual abuse reporting systems as a step toward eradicating sexual abuse.
