= Jonathan Pollard =

American intelligence analyst and convicted spy (born 1954)

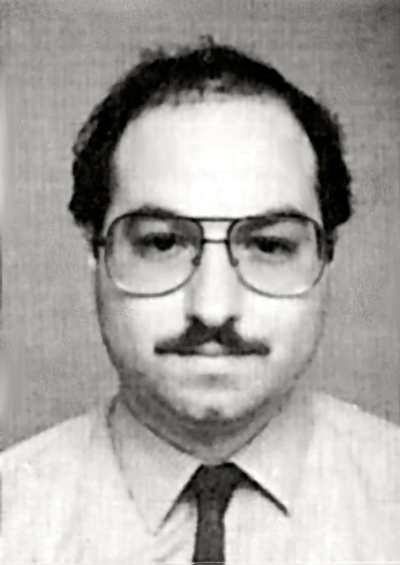
- Born: Jonathan Jay Pollard; August 7, 1954 (age 72); Galveston, Texas, U.S.
- Citizenship: United States (1954–present); Israel (1995–present)
- Education: Stanford University (BA)
- Occupations: Former intelligence analyst and spy for Israel
- Spouses: Anne Henderson (m. 1985; div. 1990); Esther Zeitz (m. 1993; died 2022); Rivka Abrahams-Donin (m. 2022)
- Status: Released
- Conviction: Conspiracy to deliver national defense information to a foreign government (18 U.S.C. § 794)
- Penalty: Life imprisonment

Jonathan Jay Pollard (Hebrew: יונתן פולארד, romanized: Yonatan Polard, born August 7, 1954) is an American-born Israeli spy and former American intelligence analyst who was jailed for spying for Israel.

In 1984, Pollard sold numerous state secrets, including the National Security Agency's ten-volume manual on how the US gathers its signal intelligence and disclosed the names of thousands of people who had cooperated with US intelligence agencies. He was apprehended in 1985 and in subsequent proceedings agreed to a plea deal, pleaded guilty to spying for and providing top-secret classified information to Israel. Pollard admitted shopping his services—successfully, in some cases—to other countries. In 1987, he was sentenced to life in prison for violations of the Espionage Act.

The Israeli government acknowledged part of its role in Pollard's espionage in 1987 and issued a formal apology to the US, but did not admit to paying him until 1998. Over the course of his imprisonment, Israeli officials, US-Israeli activist groups and some American politicians continually lobbied for a reduction or commutation of his sentence. In defense of his actions, Pollard said the American intelligence establishment collectively endangered Israel's security by withholding crucial information.

Opposing any form of clemency for Pollard were many active and retired US officials, including Donald Rumsfeld, Dick Cheney, former CIA director George Tenet; several former US secretaries of defense; a bi-partisan group of US congressional leaders; and members of the US Intelligence Community. They maintained that the damage to US national security due to Pollard's espionage was much more severe, wide-ranging, and enduring than acknowledged publicly.

Although Pollard argued that he only supplied Israel with information critical to its security, opponents stated that he had no way of knowing what the Israelis had received through legitimate exchanges and that much of the data he compromised had nothing to do with Israeli security. Pollard revealed aspects of the US intelligence gathering process, including its "sources and methods". In 1995, while imprisoned, he was granted Israeli citizenship.

Pollard was released from prison on November 20, 2015. On November 20, 2020, his parole expired and all restrictions were eliminated. On December 30, 2020, Pollard and his second wife relocated to Israel and settled in Jerusalem.

Since relocating to Israel, Pollard has endorsed Israeli far-right minister Itamar Ben-Gvir and advocated a population transfer to relocate Gaza's Palestinians to Ireland.

== Early life ==
Jonathan Jay Pollard was born in Galveston, Texas, in 1954, to a Jewish family, the youngest of three siblings born to Morris and Mildred "Molly" Klein (Kahn) Pollard. In 1961, his family relocated to South Bend, Indiana, where his father Morris, an award-winning microbiologist, taught at the University of Notre Dame.

At an early age, Pollard became aware of the extent to which members of his mother's family, the Kleins (Kahns) from Vilna in Lithuania, had been murdered during the Holocaust. Shortly before his bar mitzvah, he asked his parents to visit the Nazi death camps. Pollard's family made a special effort to instill a sense of Jewish identity in their children, which included devotion to Zionism.

Pollard grew up with what he termed a "racial obligation" to Israel, and made his first visit to Israel in 1970, as part of a science program visiting the Weizmann Institute of Science in Rehovot. While there, he was hospitalized after a fight with another student. One Weizmann scientist remembered Pollard as leaving behind "a reputation of being a troublemaker".

Later, Pollard enrolled in several graduate schools, but never completed a post-graduate degree.

Pollard's future wife, Anne Henderson (born 1960), relocated to Washington, D.C., during the autumn of 1978 to live with her (recently divorced) father, Bernard Henderson. During the summer of 1981, she moved into a house on Capitol Hill with two other women and, through a friend of one of her roommates, she first met Pollard. He later said he had fallen in love during their first meeting—they were "an inseparable couple" by November 1981, and in June 1982, when her Capitol Hill lease expired, she moved into Pollard's apartment in Arlington, Virginia. In December 1982, the couple moved into downtown Washington, D.C., to a two-bedroom apartment at 1733 20th Street NW, near Dupont Circle. They married on August 9, 1985, more than a year after Pollard began spying for Israel, in a civil ceremony in Venice, Italy. At the time of their arrest, in November 1985, they were paying US$750 (equivalent to $2,245 in 2025) per month in rent.

== Early career ==
Pollard began applying for intelligence service jobs in 1979 after quitting graduate school, first at the Central Intelligence Agency (CIA) and then at the US Navy. Pollard was refused for the CIA job after taking a polygraph test in which he admitted to prolific illegal drug usage between 1974 and 1978.

He fared better with the Navy, and on September 19, 1979, he was hired by the Navy Field Operational Intelligence Office (NFOIO), an office of the Naval Intelligence Command (NIC). As an intelligence specialist, he was to work on Soviet issues at the Navy Ocean Surveillance Information Center (NOSIC), a department of NFOIO. A background check was required to receive the necessary security clearances, but no polygraph test. In addition to a Top Secret clearance, a more stringent 'Sensitive Compartmented Information' (SCI) clearance was required. The Navy asked for but was denied information from the CIA regarding Pollard, including the results of their pre-employment polygraph test revealing Pollard's excessive drug use.

Pollard was given temporary non-SCI security clearances pending completion of his background check, which was normal for new hires at the time. He was assigned to temporary duty at another NIC Department, the Naval Intelligence Support Center (NISC) Surface Ships Division, where he could work on tasks that did not require SCI clearance. NOSIC's current operations facility and the NISC were co-located in Suitland, Maryland.

Two months after Pollard was hired, he approached the technical director of NOSIC, Richard Haver, and offered to start a back-channel operation with the South African intelligence service. He also lied about his father being involved with CIA operations in South Africa. Haver became wary of Pollard and requested that he be terminated. However, Haver's boss believed that Pollard's supposed connection with South African intelligence could be useful, and he reassigned him to a Navy human intelligence (HUMINT) operation, Task Force 168 (TF-168). This office was within Naval Intelligence Command (NIC), the headquarters for Navy intelligence operations (located in a separate building, but still within the Suitland Federal Center complex.) It was later discovered that Pollard had lied repeatedly during the vetting process for this position: he denied illegal drug use, claimed his father had been a CIA operative, misrepresented his language abilities and his educational achievements, and claimed to have applied for a commission as officer in the Naval Reserve. A month later Pollard received his SCI clearances and was transferred from NISC to TF-168.

While transferring to his new job at TF-168, Pollard again initiated a meeting with someone far up the chain of command, this time with Admiral Sumner Shapiro, Commander, Naval Intelligence Command (CNIC), about an idea he had for TF-168 and South Africa. (The TF-168 group had passed on his ideas.) After the meeting, Shapiro immediately ordered that Pollard's security clearances be revoked and that he be reassigned to a non-sensitive position. According to The Washington Post, Shapiro dismissed Pollard as a "kook", saying later, "I wish the hell I'd fired him".

Because of the job transfer, Shapiro's order to remove Pollard's security clearances was neglected. However, Shapiro's office followed up with a request to TF-168 that Pollard be investigated by the CIA. The CIA found Pollard to be a risk and recommended that he not be used in any intelligence collection operation. A subsequent polygraph test was inconclusive, although it did prompt Pollard to admit to making false statements to his superiors, prior drug use, and having unauthorized contacts with representatives of foreign governments. The special agent administering the test felt that Pollard, who at times "began shouting and shaking and making gagging sounds as if he were going to vomit", was feigning illness to invalidate the test. He recommended against Pollard's being granted access to highly classified information. Pollard was also required to be evaluated by a psychiatrist.

Pollard's clearance was reduced to Secret. He subsequently filed a grievance and threatened lawsuits to recover his SCI clearance. While awaiting his grievance to be addressed, he worked on less sensitive material and began receiving excellent performance reviews. In 1982, after the psychiatrist concluded Pollard had no mental illness, Pollard's clearance was upgraded to SCI. In October 1984, after some re-organization of the Navy's intelligence departments, Pollard applied for and was accepted into a job as an analyst for the Naval Intelligence Command.

== Espionage ==
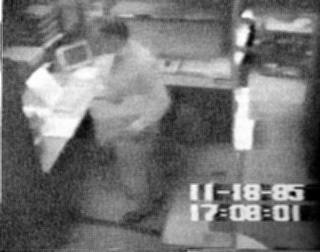
Surveillance video frame of Pollard in the act of stealing classified documents.

Soon after Pollard began working at NIC/TF-168, he met Aviem Sella, a combat veteran of the Israeli Air Force. At the time, Sella was on leave from his position as a colonel to gain a master's degree in computer science as a graduate student at New York University. Pollard told Sella that he worked for US naval intelligence, told him about specific incidents where US intelligence was withholding information from Israel, and offered to work as a spy. Though Sella had wondered whether Pollard was part of an FBI operation to recruit an Israeli, he eventually believed him. Sella telephoned his air-force intelligence commander in Tel Aviv for further instructions, and the call was switched to the Air Force chief of staff. Sella was ordered to develop a contact with Pollard, but to be careful. He was warned that either the Americans were offering a "dangle" in order to root out foreign intelligence operations, or if this was a genuine spy, Sella would have to pay careful attention to his work.

Within a few days, in June 1984, Pollard started passing classified information to Sella. He was paid $10,000 cash and given a very expensive diamond and sapphire ring, which Pollard later offered to his girlfriend, Anne Henderson, when proposing to her. Pollard was paid well by the Israelis: he received a salary that eventually reached $2,500 (equivalent to $7,484 in 2025) a month, and tens of thousands of dollars in cash disbursements for hotels, meals, and jewelry. In his pre-sentencing statement to Judge Robinson, Pollard said the money was a benefit that was forced on him. "I did accept money for my services", he acknowledged, but only "as a reflection of how well I was doing my job". He said that he had later told his controller, Rafi Eitan, a long-time spy who at the time headed Lekem, a scientific-intelligence unit in Israel, that, "I not only intended to repay all the money I'd received, but, also, was going to establish a chair at the Israeli General Staff's Intelligence Training Center outside Tel Aviv".

Naval Criminal Investigative Service (NCIS) investigator Ronald Olive has alleged that Pollard passed classified information to South Africa, and attempted, through a third party, to sell classified information to Pakistan on multiple occasions. Pollard also stole classified documents related to China on behalf of his wife, who used the information to advance her personal business interests. She kept these secret materials in the house, where investigating authorities discovered them when Pollard's espionage activity was revealed.

During Pollard's trial, the US government's memorandum in aid of sentencing challenged the "defendant's claim that he was motivated by altruism rather than greed". The government said that Pollard had "disclosed classified information in anticipation of financial gain" in other instances:

The government's investigation has revealed that defendant provided to certain of his acquaintances US classified documents which defendant obtained through US Navy sources. The classified documents which defendant disclosed to two such acquaintances, both of whom are professional investment advisers, contained classified economic and political analyses which defendant believed would help his acquaintances render investment advice to their clients ... Defendant acknowledged that, although he was not paid for his unauthorized disclosures of classified information to the above-mentioned acquaintances, he hoped to be rewarded ultimately through business opportunities that these individuals could arrange for defendant when he eventually left his position with the US Navy. In fact, defendant was involved in an ongoing business venture with two of these acquaintances at the time he provided the classified information to them ...

During the course of the Pollard trial, Australian authorities reported the disclosure of classified American documents by Pollard to a Royal Australian Navy officer who had been engaged in a personnel-exchange naval-liaison program between the US and Australia. The Australian officer, alarmed by Pollard's repeated disclosure to him of data caveated No Foreign Access Allowed, reported the indiscretions to his chain of command. It recalled the officer from his position in the US, fearing that the disclosures might be part of a "CIA ruse". Confronted with this accusation after entering his plea, Pollard admitted only to passing a single classified document to the Australian; later, he changed his story, and claimed that his superiors ordered him to share information with the Australians.

As of 2014, the full extent of the information Pollard passed to Israel has still not been officially revealed. Press reports cited a secret 46-page memorandum, which Pollard and his attorneys were allowed to view. They were provided to the judge by Secretary of Defense Caspar Weinberger, who described Pollard's spying as including, among other things, obtaining and copying the latest version of Radio-Signal Notations (RASIN), a 10-volume manual comprehensively detailing America's global electronic surveillance network.

After Pollard's release, the former deputy chief of the Mossad Ram Ben Barak publicly regretted Pollard, saying that the recruitment and operation "were unknown by the intelligence leadership and unauthorized" with the resultant damage to the US-Israeli relationship far outweighing the value of the intelligence Pollard provided. "Our entire relationship with the US deteriorated because of this. People lost jobs over it", according to Barak. "It made for years and years of suspicion, with Americans suspecting he wasn't the only one, and feeling that they hadn't gotten the necessary explanations. They didn't believe it wasn't authorized. It caused huge, huge damage. They saw it as a betrayal of them."

== Capture ==
Pollard's espionage was nearly revealed in 1984 when a department chief noted a report on Soviet military equipment and questioned why it was germane to the office. Pollard, to whom the report was traced, was asked about it, and he replied that he had been working on terrorist networks, which was accepted as valid. In 1985, a co-worker anonymously reported Pollard's removal of classified material from the NIC. The coworker noted that Pollard did not seem to be taking the material to any known appropriate destination, such as other intelligence agencies in the area. Although Pollard was authorized to transport documents and the coworker said the documents were wrapped properly, it appeared unusual that Pollard would be transporting documents on a Friday afternoon when there was little happening and people seemed to be focused on an upcoming long weekend. Ultimately, that report was not acted upon as it was felt it occurred within business hours and Pollard had business being in other offices. In another instance Pollard's direct superior, having to complete extra work at the office on a Saturday, had walked by Pollard's desk and noticed unsecured classified material. Taking the initiative to secure it, the supervisor glanced over it and saw it was unrelated to antiterrorism matters in the Caribbean, with which the section was concerned. Looking at more unrelated documents, the supervisor believed foreign intelligence might be involved, but was unable to determine which nation might be interested.

Pollard was stopped and questioned by FBI agents about a week later while removing classified material from his work premises. He explained that he was taking it to another analyst at a different agency for a consultation. His story was checked and found to be false. Pollard requested a telephone call to his wife to tell her where he was. As the interview was voluntary, the investigators had no choice but to grant the request. During the call to Anne, Pollard used the code word "cactus", signaling that he was in trouble, and that she should remove all classified material from their home. She attempted to do this, enlisting the help of a neighbor.

Pollard later agreed to a search of his home, which found the few documents which Anne had missed. At this time, the FBI decided to cede the case to Pollard's supervisors, since they had uncovered only mishandling of documents, with no proof that Pollard was passing classified information. The case broke wide open a few days later, when Pollard was asked by his superiors to take a polygraph test. Instead, he admitted to passing documents illegally, without mentioning Israel. The FBI again became involved. A brief time later, Pollard's neighbor, a naval officer, became concerned about safeguarding the 70-pound (32 kg) suitcase full of highly classified material that Anne had given him, and began telephoning around the military intelligence community asking for advice. He cooperated fully with the investigation and was never charged with any crime.

After his partial confession, Pollard was surveilled, but not taken into custody. On November 21, 1985, he and his wife tried to gain asylum at the Israeli Embassy in Washington, D.C., but they were ordered to leave by Israeli guards. FBI agents arrested Pollard as soon as he left embassy property. His handler, Rafi Eitan, stated in a 2014 interview that Pollard had been warned that he was uncovered and that he had given him a prearranged signal to leave the United States, but instead Pollard "wandered around for three days with them following him. He had many opportunities to do what I told him and he didn't do it." Eitan claimed that he had given the order to evict Pollard from the embassy.

After Pollard's arrest, Anne evaded an FBI agent who was following her, met Sella at a restaurant, and told him of her husband's arrest. As a result, three Israeli diplomatic personnel involved in the operation were also informed: science attachés Yosef Yagur and Ilan Ravid, and embassy secretary Irit Erb. LAKAM had not foreseen this turn of events nor crafted escape plans, and they were told to flee immediately. The apartment where the documents stolen by Pollard were kept and copied was cleared out, and all four immediately fled Washington. Sella and his wife took a train to New York and caught a flight to London, Yagur fled to Canada, Erb to Mexico, and Ravid to Miami, from where they caught connecting flights to Israel. All were out of the United States in 24 hours. Anne was arrested the next day, November 22, 1985.

=== Investigation ===
Prior to Pollard's plea bargain, the US sent a delegation of diplomats and prosecutors under Abraham Sofaer, Legal Advisor to the United States State Department, to Israel to conduct an investigation on Pollard's spying activity. Israel said initially that Pollard worked for an unauthorized rogue operation, which they maintained for more than ten years.

Sofaer arbitrated a deal whereby Israel was supposed to provide all material information about Pollard's activities and the names of all the people with whom he interacted in exchange for immunity for all the individuals involved except for Pollard himself. When asked to return the stolen material, the Israelis reportedly supplied only a few dozen less sensitive documents. At the time, the Americans knew that Pollard had passed tens of thousands of documents. Due to incomplete document disclosure, the deal was revised under Sofaer to enable Israel to comply with the agreement, on pain of Americans vacating the agreement and depriving the Israelis of immunity. Although Israel produced more documents thereafter, they ultimately still did not comply with the terms of the agreement.

The Israelis created a schedule designed to wear the American investigators down, including many hours per day of commuting in blacked-out buses on rough roads, and frequent switching of buses, leaving them without adequate time to sleep, and preventing them from sleeping on the commute. The identity of Pollard's original handler, Sella, was withheld. All questions had to be translated into Hebrew and answered in Hebrew, and then translated back into English, even though all the parties spoke perfect English. The Commander Jerry Agee remembers that, even as he departed the airport, airport security informed him that "you will never be coming back here again". After his return to the US, Agee found various items had been stolen from his luggage. The abuse came not only from the guards and officials, but also the Israeli media.

The US government began preparing a multi-count criminal indictment against Pollard, which included drug offences and tax fraud along with espionage. The government alleged that Pollard used classified documents to unsuccessfully broker an arms deal with the governments of South Africa, Argentina, and Taiwan. FBI investigators also determined that Pollard met with three Pakistanis and an Iranian foreigner in an attempt to broker arms in 1985. Pollard eventually cooperated with investigators in exchange for a plea agreement for leniency for himself and his wife.

Sella was eventually indicted on three counts of espionage by a United States court. Israel refused to allow Sella to be interviewed unless he was granted immunity. The United States refused because of Israel's previous failure to cooperate as promised. Israel refused to extradite Sella, instead giving him command of Tel Nof Airbase. The US Congress responded by threatening to cut aid to Israel, at which point Sella voluntarily stepped down to defuse tensions.

During the morning of January 20, 2021, the last half-day of Donald Trump's first presidential term, the White House announced that Trump had granted a full pardon to Sella. The announcement stated that the State of Israel had requested the pardon and had issued a full and unequivocal apology. The announcement also stated that Prime Minister of Israel Benjamin Netanyahu, Israeli ambassador to the United States Ron Dermer, United States ambassador to Israel David Friedman and Miriam Adelson had endorsed Sella's request for clemency.

== Trial ==
Pollard's plea discussions with the government sought both to avoid a life sentence for him and to allow Anne Pollard to plead to lesser charges, which the government was otherwise unwilling to let her do. The government, however, did eventually offer Anne Pollard a plea agreement provided that Jonathan Pollard assist the government in its damage assessment. As part of this process, he agreed to polygraph examinations, and interviews with FBI agents and Department of Justice attorneys over a period of several months. During late May 1986, the government offered him a plea agreement, which he accepted. By the terms of that agreement, Pollard was required to plead guilty to one count of conspiracy to deliver national defense information to a foreign government, which had a maximum prison term of life, and to cooperate fully with the government's ongoing investigation. He promised not to disseminate any information concerning his crimes or his case, or to speak publicly about any classified information, without first receiving permission from the director of naval intelligence. He further agreed that failure of Anne Pollard to obey the terms of her agreement entitled the government to void his agreement, and vice versa. In return for Pollard's plea, the government promised not to charge him with additional crimes.

Three weeks before Pollard's sentencing, Wolf Blitzer, at the time a Jerusalem Post correspondent, performed a jail-cell interview with Pollard. The interview formed the basis of Blitzer's newspaper article, which was also printed in The Washington Post on February 15, 1987, under the headline "Pollard: Not A Bumbler, but Israel's Master Spy". Pollard told Blitzer about some of the information he provided the Israelis: reconnaissance satellite photography of Palestine Liberation Organization (PLO) headquarters in Tunisia, which was used for Operation Wooden Leg; specific capabilities of Libya's air defenses; and "the pick of US intelligence about Arab and Islamic conventional and unconventional military activity, from Morocco to Pakistan and every country in between. This included both 'friendly' and 'unfriendly' Arab countries." Prosecutor Joseph diGenova presented the Blitzer prison interview as evidence in his sentencing memorandum that Pollard had engaged in "unauthorized disclosure of classified information".

Prior to sentencing, Pollard and his wife Anne gave further defiant media interviews in which they defended their spying and attempted to rally Jewish Americans to their cause, diGenova said. In a 60 Minutes interview from prison, Anne said, "I feel my husband and I did what we were expected to do, and what our moral obligation was as Jews, what our moral obligation was as human beings, and I have no regrets about that". Pollard started to attack some Jewish Americans as traitors, calling Abraham Sofaer, for instance, "less than admirable" for his involvement in the prosecution.

On June 4, 1986, Pollard pleaded guilty to one count of conspiracy to deliver national defense information to a foreign government. Prior to sentencing, speaking on his own behalf, Pollard stated that while his motives "may have been well meaning, they cannot, under any stretch of the imagination, excuse or justify the violation of the law, particularly one that involves the trust of government ... I broke trust, ruined and brought disgrace to my family." He admitted and apologized for taking money from the Israeli government in exchange for classified information. Anne Pollard, in her own statement, stated that she did "what at the time I believed to be correct" in helping her husband and attempting to conceal stolen documents, adding, "And I can't say that I would never help him again. However, I would look for different routes or different ways".

The prosecution answered these statements by saying that the Pollards had continued to violate numerous nondisclosure agreements even as the trial was occurring. The prosecutor, Joseph E. diGenova noted one in particular, which had been signed in June 1986, alluding to Pollard's interview with Wolf Blitzer. The prosecutor concluded:

[I]n combination with the breadth of this man's knowledge, the depth of his memory, and the complete lack of honor that he has demonstrated in these proceedings, I suggest to you, your honor, he is a very dangerous man.

"The government did something highly suspicious by forgetting to send anyone to monitor these interviews", Esther Pollard said. "Later, at sentencing, the prosecutor successfully inflamed the judge against Jonathan by falsely claiming that not only had the interviews been secretly arranged behind their backs, but that Jonathan had also disclosed highly classified material to Blitzer that compromised the intelligence community's sources and methods."

=== Sentencing and incarceration ===
The Pollards were sentenced on March 4, 1987. While the prosecutor, in compliance with the plea agreement, recommended that Pollard receive "only a substantial number of years in prison", Judge Aubrey Robinson Jr. was not obliged to follow the recommendation. Noting that Pollard had violated multiple conditions of the plea agreement, he imposed a life sentence on the basis of a classified damage-assessment memorandum submitted by Secretary of Defense Caspar Weinberger.

Pollard was then moved from FCC Petersburg in Virginia, where he had been held since 1986, to a federal prison hospital in Springfield, Missouri, to undergo a battery of mental health tests. In June 1988, he was transferred to USP Marion and in 1993 to FCI Butner Medium at the Butner Federal Correction Complex in North Carolina. In May 1991, Pollard asked Avi Weiss to be his personal rabbi. Israeli Chief Rabbi Mordechai Eliyahu was also an advocate of Pollard, and campaigned for his release from prison.

Anne Pollard was sentenced to five years, but was paroled after three and a half years due to health problems. Pollard filed for divorce after Anne's release. While he reportedly said that he expected to be jailed for the remainder of his life, and did not want Anne to be bound to him, Anne later told a reporter that the divorce papers were served with no warning or explanation of any kind.

After finalization of his divorce from Anne, Pollard allegedly married Esther "Elaine" Zeitz, a Canadian teacher and activist based in Toronto who had organized a campaign for his release. In 1996, she initiated a public hunger strike, but ended it 19 days later after meeting with Israeli prime minister Benjamin Netanyahu, who pledged to increase his efforts to secure Pollard's release. Media sources and Pollard family members have questioned whether Pollard and Zeitz ever legally wed. Prison officials told Ha'aretz that there is no record of a marriage ceremony having been requested or performed. After completing her parole, Anne Pollard emigrated to Israel, where she lived in Tel Aviv on a government stipend supplemented by occasional private donations.

=== Appeals ===
In 1989, Pollard's attorneys filed a motion for withdrawal of his guilty plea and trial by jury due to the government's failure to abide by terms of the plea agreement. The motion was denied. An appeals court affirmed the denial. Several years later, with a different attorney, Pollard filed a petition for habeas corpus. A panel of the US Court of Appeals for the District of Columbia Circuit ruled two-to-one to deny Pollard's petition, due primarily to the failure of Pollard's original attorneys to file his appeal in a timely manner. Judge Stephen F. Williams dissented, "because the government's breach of the plea agreement was a fundamental miscarriage of justice requiring relief under 28 USC. § 2255".

In July 2005, Pollard again filed a motion for a new trial, this time on the grounds of ineffective assistance of counsel. He also sought access to classified documents pertinent to his new lawyers' efforts in preparing a clemency petition. The Court of Appeals rejected both arguments. During February 2006, his attorneys filed a petition for certiorari with the United States Supreme Court regarding access to the classified documents. They argued that the separation of powers doctrine is a flexible doctrine that does not dictate the complete separation of the three branches of Government from one another. The brief claimed that the Court of Appeals violated this principle in asserting sua sponte that the judiciary has no jurisdiction over the classified documents due to the fact that access was for the ultimate purpose of clemency, an executive function. The Supreme Court denied the cert petition in March 2006, ruling that the president's clemency power would be wholly unaffected by successor counsel's access to the classified documents, and that the classified documents were sealed by a protective order, a judicial procedure.

== Israeli efforts to secure Pollard's release ==
In 1988, Israel proposed a three-way exchange, wherein Pollard and his wife would be released and deported to Israel, Israel would release Soviet spy Marcus Klingberg, and the USSR would exercise its influence with Syria and Iran to release American hostages held there by Syrian- and Iranian-sponsored militant groups.

In 1990, Israel reportedly considered offering to release Yosef Amit, an Israeli military intelligence officer serving a 12-year sentence for spying for the United States and another NATO power, in exchange for Pollard. Sources conflict on the outcome: according to one, Amit made it known that he had no wish to be exchanged. By another account, Israeli officials vetoed the idea, fearing that it would only cause more anger in the United States. (Amit served his sentence and was released in 1993.)

During the 1990s former University of Notre Dame president Theodore Hesburgh, a family friend of Pollard's, attempted to broker a deal whereby Pollard would be released, "be banished to Israel", and would renounce his US citizenship. Mike Royko of the Chicago Tribune wrote columns in February 1994 endorsing the idea. White House officials expressed little enthusiasm for Hesburgh's plan, and he ceased further efforts.

During 1995, Israel again attempted to arrange a three-way exchange, this time involving American spies imprisoned in Russia: Israel would release Klingberg, the Russians would release US agents who had remained in prison since the dissolution of the Soviet Union, and the United States would then free Pollard.

Israel's official stance until 1998 was that Pollard worked for an unauthorized rogue organization. During May of that year, Premier Netanyahu admitted that Pollard had in fact been an Israeli agent, answering directly to high-ranking officials of Lekem, the Israeli Bureau for Scientific Relations. The Israeli government paid at least two of the attorneys—Richard A. Hibey and Hamilton Philip Fox III—working for his release.

During campaigning leading up to the 1999 Israeli general election, Netanyahu and his challenger Ehud Barak disputed in the media over which had been more supportive of Pollard. In 2002, Netanyahu visited Pollard in prison. In 2007 he pledged that, if re-elected Premier, he would obtain Pollard's release.

In September 2009, Israeli State Comptroller Micha Lindenstrauss released a report stating that repeated petitions for Pollard's release during a 20-year period had been rebuffed by the American government. The Pollard family criticized the report, terming it a "whitewash" of the Israeli government's activities, although they agreed with its assertion that Pollard had been denied due legal process.

In June 2011, 70 members of the Israeli parliament, the Knesset, endorsed the Pollard family's request that President Obama allow Pollard to visit his ailing father, Morris. When Morris died soon afterward, Netanyahu announced Israel's official endorsement for Pollard's request to attend his father's funeral. Both requests were denied.

In November 2014, Rafi Eitan, who directed Lekem from 1981 until its dissolution in 1986, admitted that he knew in advance of Pollard's impending arrest in 1985 and alerted then-Premier Shimon Peres and Defense Minister Yitzhak Rabin. Eitan says it was his decision to refuse Pollard's request for asylum in the Israeli Embassy. When asked if Israeli officials were aware of Pollard's espionage activities, he replied, "Of course".

=== Citizenship ===
Pollard applied for Israeli citizenship in 1995; the Ministry of Interior initially refused on grounds that Israel did not grant citizenship to persons who had not yet immigrated, but reversed its decision and granted the petition on November 22, 1995.

Some sources claim that Pollard then renounced his United States citizenship, was now solely an Israeli citizen, and would be deported to Israel if he were released from prison. Others continue to identify him as a US citizen. According to the United States Department of State, there are no peacetime regulations in effect under 8 U.S.C. § 1481(a)(6) to empower the attorney general to process renunciations of citizenship from persons physically present in the United States, and by 8 U.S.C. § 1483, it is not possible for a person to lose US citizenship while physically present in the United States except by renunciation filed with the Attorney General, or conviction of treason.

On December 30, 2020, Jonathan Pollard and his wife officially immigrated to Israel and became full Israeli citizens.

== Official reactions and public pro-Pollard campaigns ==
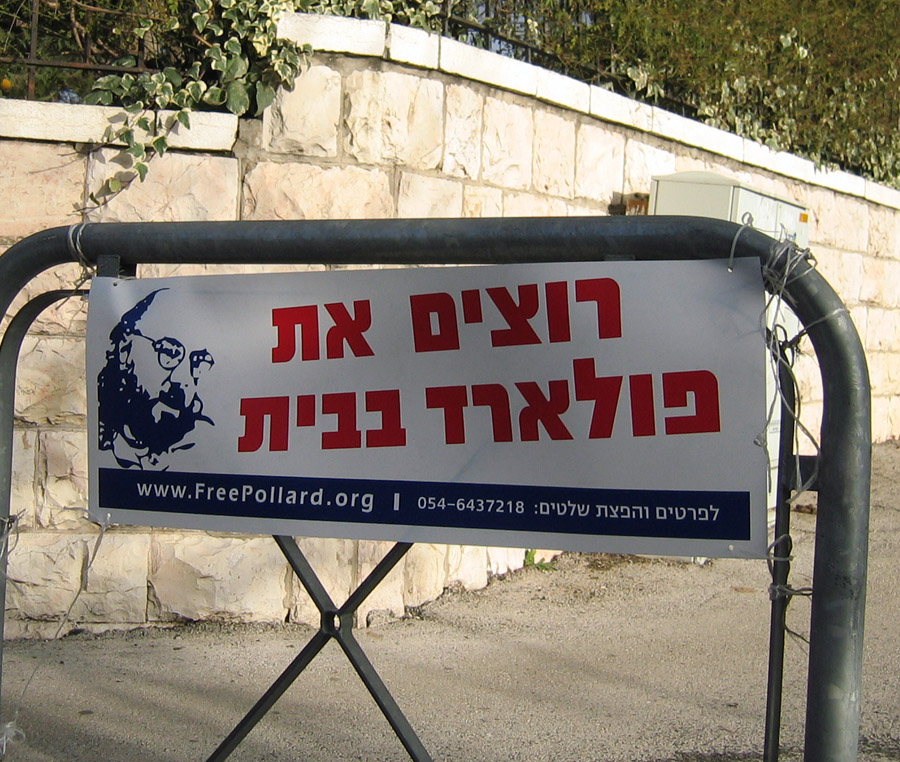
This sign reads "We Want Pollard at Home".

In addition to the release requests by the Israeli government, there was a long-running public campaign to free Pollard. The organizers include the Pollard family, his ex-wife, Anne, and Jewish groups in the US and Israel. The campaign's main points claimed that Pollard spied for an ally instead of an enemy, that his sentence was out of proportion to those given to others who committed similar crimes, and that the US failed to live up to its plea bargain. Some Israeli activists compared President Bush to Hamas and Hezbollah leaders who have taken Israeli soldiers prisoner.

Some who feel the sentence was excessive claim that although Pollard pleaded guilty as part of a plea bargain for himself and his wife, he was shown no leniency, and was given the maximum sentence with the exception of death; Pollard's opponents answer that Pollard violated the terms of that plea agreement even before the sentence was given.

In 1993, political science professor and Orthodox Jewish activist David Luchins organized an unsuccessful appeal to President Bill Clinton to commute Pollard's sentence. The appeal included a letter of remorse from Pollard in which he admitted violating both US laws and Jewish religious tenets. Pollard later reportedly regretted his admission, suspecting that it worsened his chances for clemency. Pollard loyalists blamed Luchins, who received death threats and required federal protection for a period of time.

The issue of his imprisonment has sometimes arisen amidst Israeli domestic politics. Benjamin Netanyahu has been particularly vocal in lobbying for Pollard's release, visiting Pollard in prison in 2002. He raised the issue with President Clinton during the Wye River peace talks in October 1998. In his autobiography, Clinton wrote that he favored releasing Pollard, but the objections of US intelligence officials were too strong:

For all the sympathy Pollard generated in Israel, he was a hard case to push in America; he had sold our country's secrets for money, not conviction, and for years had not shown any remorse. When I talked to Sandy Berger and George Tenet, they were adamantly opposed to letting Pollard go, as was Madeleine Albright.

Alan Dershowitz, a Harvard law professor who has participated in the defense of a number of controversial figures, has been among Pollard's well-known advocates, both in the courtroom as a lawyer and in various print media. Characterizing the sentence as "excessive", Dershowitz writes in an article reprinted in his bestselling book Chutzpah, "As an American, and as a Jew, I hereby express my outrage at Jonathan Pollard's sentence of life imprisonment for the crime to which he pleaded guilty". Dershowitz writes:

[E]veryone seems frightened to speak up on behalf of a convicted spy. This has been especially true of the Jewish leadership in America. The Pollards are Jewish. ... The Pollards are also Zionists, who—out of a sense of misguided "racial imperative" (to quote Jonathan Pollard)—seem to place their commitment to Israeli survival over the laws of their own country. ... American Jewish leaders, always sensitive to the canard of dual loyalty, are keeping a low profile in the Pollard matter. Many American Jews at the grass roots are outraged at what they perceive to be an overreaction to the Pollards' crimes and the unusually long sentence imposed on Jonathan Pollard.

In 1991, the ADL rejected a resolution proposed by Alan Dershowitz to support Pollard after Abraham Sofaer, former Legal Advisor to the United States State Department, delivered a speech condemning Pollard's actions as meritless: "What Jonathan Pollard did is indefensible. When you start to defend it, you start to create a problem of anti-Semitism in this country beyond the problem that exists already."

In 2011, in the midst of speculation about a presidential run, Mike Huckabee advocated for Pollard's release. In 2012, Malcolm Hoenlein advocated for Pollards' release, saying "27 years—he's paid the price for his crimes. He has expressed remorse. Enough is enough. It's time that he be let go—there is no justification that we can see for keeping him any longer, there's no cause of justice, no security interest that could possibly be served".

In 2013, Rabbi Pesach Lerner, executive vice president of the National Council of Young Israel, cited hypocrisy of Pollard's imprisonment in America after revelations of spying against US allies by the United States intelligence agencies.

In 18 years on the bench, I imposed life sentences on four defendants only [two murderers and two terrorists]. Pollard's offense does not nearly approach any of those.

— Former US Attorney General Michael Mukasey in a letter sent to President Barack Obama

The Jerusalem City Council has also acted in advocacy of Pollard, changing the name of a square near the official premier's residence from Paris Square to Freedom for Jonathan Pollard Square.

Pollard claimed that he provided only information that was vital to Israeli security, and that it was being withheld by the Pentagon, in violation of a 1983 memorandum of understanding between the two countries. The memorandum of understanding was an agreement between the United States and Israel regarding the sharing of vital security intelligence. According to Pollard, this included data on Soviet arms shipments to Syria, Iraqi and Syrian chemical weapons, the Pakistani atomic bomb project, and Libyan air defense systems. According to the declassified CIA 1987 damage assessment of the Pollard case, with the heading "What the Israelis Did Not Ask For", the assessment notes that the Israelis "never expressed interest in US military activities, plans, capabilities, or equipment". Pollard's defense claimed that Israel had the legal right to the information that Pollard passed to Israel based upon the 1983 Memorandum of understanding and the United States was violating that Memorandum.

Lee Hamilton, a former US congressman from Indiana who was chairman of the House Intelligence Committee at the time of Pollard's sentencing, wrote an emotional letter to President Obama in 2011 endorsing commutation of Pollard's sentence. "I have been acquainted for many years with members of his family, especially his parents, and I know how much pain and anguish they have suffered because of their son's incarceration", he wrote. Hamilton added that Pollard's father, whose health was failing rapidly, deserved to see his son freed.

In 2010, representatives Barney Frank (D-Mass.), Edolphus Towns (D-N.Y.), Anthony Weiner (D-N.Y.), and Bill Pascrell (D-N.J.) wrote a letter that "notes the positive impact that a grant of clemency would have in Israel, as a strong indication of the goodwill of our nation towards Israel and the Israeli people". In November 2010, Weiner stated: "No one in the history of the United States who did something similar to Jonathan Pollard served a life sentence, nor should he".

Dennis B. Ross said in 2004: "Pollard received a harsher sentence than others who committed comparable crimes". Former US Secretary of Defense Caspar Weinberger stated that "[t]he Pollard matter was comparatively minor. It was made far bigger than its actual importance." Stephen Fain Williams, a Senior Circuit Judge on the United States Court of Appeals for the District of Columbia Circuit stated: "Jonathan Pollard's life sentence represents a fundamental miscarriage of justice". In December 2010, former US assistant Secretary of Defense Lawrence Korb said: "In retrospect, we know that an injustice was done to Pollard ... the man is very sick and should be released before it is too late." Some of the accusations against Pollard can be traced to CIA mole Aldrich Ames, who allegedly blamed Pollard to clear himself of suspicion. Rafi Eitan, Pollard's Israeli handler, stated that Pollard never exposed American agents in the USSR or elsewhere. Eitan said he believed Ames tried to blame Pollard to clear himself of suspicion. (Note: Mr. Eitan spoke about the Pollard case for the first time to Ronen Bergman of the newspaper, which is publishing the comments on Friday. Mr. Eitan said that Mr. Pollard never exposed American agents in the Soviet Union or elsewhere. Mr. Eitan also said he believed that the American double agent Aldrich Ames, who was spying for the Soviet Union, tried to blame Mr. Pollard for exposing the American agents to clear himself of suspicion. 'I have no doubt that had Pollard been tried today, in light of what is known about Ames and other agents who were exposed, he would have received a much lighter sentence,' [Mr. Eitan said].)

On November 18, 2010, 39 members of Congress submitted a plea of clemency to the White House on behalf of Pollard, asking the president for his immediate release: "We see clemency for Mr. Pollard as an act of compassion justified by the way others have been treated by our justice system." They stated how there has been a great disparity by the amount of time that Pollard has served and by others who were found guilty of similar activities.

Former White House Counsel, Bernard Nussbaum, wrote a letter on January 28, 2011, to President Obama stating that he extensively reviewed the Jonathan Pollard file while he served in the White House. In his letter, he stated, "that a failure at this time to commute his sentence would not serve the course of justice; indeed, I respectfully believe, it would be a miscarriage of justice".

Former secretary of state George Shultz also wrote a letter to President Obama on January 11, 2011, urging that Pollard sentence to be commuted. He stated, "I am impressed that the people who are best informed about the classified material he passed to Israel, former CIA Director James Woolsey and former Chairman of the Senate Intelligence Committee Dennis DeConcini, favor his release".

In 2011, Henry Kissinger, former US secretary of state, declared that the time had come to commute the sentence of Pollard. On March 3, 2011, Kissinger wrote a letter to President Obama stating, "Having talked with George Shultz and read the statements of former CIA Director Woolsey, former Senate Intelligence Committee Chairman DeConcini, former Defense Secretary Weinberger, former Attorney General Mukasey and others whose judgement and first-hand knowledge of the case I respect, I find their unanimous support for clemency compelling. I believe justice would be served by commuting the remainder of Jonathan Pollard's sentence of life imprisonment".

Lawrence Korb, former Assistant Secretary of Defense under Ronald Reagan, called on the Obama administration to grant clemency to Pollard:

Some now argue that Pollard should be released because it would improve US-Israeli relations and enhance the prospects of success of the Obama administration's Middle East peace process. Although that may be true, it is not the reason I and many others have recently written to the president requesting that he grant Pollard clemency. The reason is that Pollard has already served far too long for the crime for which he was convicted, and by now, whatever facts he might know would have little effect on national security.

In the words of Lawrence Korb, "We believe that his continued incarceration constitutes a travesty of justice and a stain on the American system of justice."

Former vice president Dan Quayle wrote a letter to President Obama on January 31, 2011, urging him to commute Pollard's sentence.

On February 16, 2011, Arlen Specter wrote a letter to President Obama, stating that, as the chairman of the Senate Intelligence Committee, he believed Pollard should be pardoned. Specter was the second chairman of the Senate Intelligence Committee (the first was Dennis DeConcini) to publicly advocate Pollard's release.

On March 22, 2011, more than one hundred New York State legislators signed a petition to President Obama stating, "that we see clemency for Mr. Pollard as an act of compassion justified by the way others have been treated by our justice system".

Christine Quinn, Speaker of the New York City Council, wrote a letter to President Obama on December 26, 2012, formally requesting that he commute Pollard's sentence. She stated that he has expressed great remorse. She wrote, "I know I share similar views with many past and current American elected officials" and "therefore, I respectfully urge you to use your constitutional power to treat Mr. Pollard the way others have been treated by our nation's justice system".

In August 2011 Barney Frank sought permission from Congress to discuss the incarceration of Jonathan Pollard and called on Barack Obama to "answer the many calls for Pollard's immediate release". Frank said Pollard has paid a price much higher than anyone else that spied for a friend of the United States and more than many who spied for its enemies.

Congressman Allen West from Florida, wrote a letter to President Obama on June 2, 2011, stating, "After serving 26 years behind bars, Jonathan Pollard's health is deteriorating, as is his wife's. If we can consent to the release by the British of the Lockerbie bomber back to Libya due to health concern, how can we justify keeping Mr. Pollard behind bars when his crimes were clearly not as serious as a terrorist who murdered hundreds of Americans?"

On October 26, 2011, a bi-partisan group of 18 retired US senators wrote to President Obama urging him to commute Jonathan Pollard's prison sentence to time served. The letter included senators who initially opposed his release. In the letter, it stated, "Mr. Pollard will complete his 26th year of incarceration on November 21, 2011 and begin his 27th year of an unprecedented life sentence (seven of which were spent in solitary confinement). He was indicted on one count of passing classified information to an ally without intent to harm the United States—an offense that normally results in a 2–4 year sentence. He pled guilty under a plea agreement with which he fully complied, but which was ignored by the sentencing judge. Mr. Pollard is the only person in the history of the US to receive a life sentence for passing classified information to an ally." They conclude, "It is patently clear that Mr. Pollard's sentence is severely disproportionate and (as several federal judges have noted) a gross miscarriage of justice."

In a letter to the editor of The Wall Street Journal, published on July 5, 2012, James Woolsey wrote that he now endorses release of the convicted spy for Israel, citing the passage of time: "When I recommended against clemency, Pollard had been in prison less than a decade. Today he has been incarcerated for over a quarter of a century under his life sentence." He pointed out that of the more than 50 recently convicted Soviet and Chinese spies, only two received life sentences, and two-thirds were sentenced to less time than Pollard has served so far. He further stated that "Pollard has cooperated fully with the US government, pledged not to profit from his crime (e.g., from book sales), and has many times expressed remorse for what he did." Woolsey expressed his belief that Pollard is still imprisoned only because he is Jewish. He said, "anti-Semitism played a role in the continued detention of Pollard." "For those hung up for some reason on the fact that he's an American Jew, pretend he's a Greek- or Korean- or Filipino-American and free him", Woolsey, who is not Jewish, said in his letter to the Wall Street Journal.

Angelo Codevilla, who has studied the Pollard case since serving as a senior staff member for the Senate intelligence committee from 1978 to 1985, argued that the swarm of accusations against Pollard over the years is implausible. On November 15, 2013, Professor Codevilla wrote a letter to President Obama, stating, "Others have pointed out that Pollard is the only person ever sentenced to life imprisonment for passing information to an ally, without intent to harm America, a crime which normally carries a sentence of 2–4 years; and that this disproportionate sentence in violation of a plea agreement was based not on the indictment, but on a memorandum that was never shared with the defense. This is not how American justice is supposed to work." In an interview to the Weekly Standard, Codevilla stated, "The story of the Pollard case is a blot on American justice." The life sentence "makes you ashamed to be an American".

Former Speaker of the House Newt Gingrich endorsed releasing Pollard.

According to American intelligence expert John Loftus, former US government prosecutor and army intelligence officer, Pollard could not have revealed the identities of American spies, as Pollard lacked the security clearance to access this information. In the opinion of Loftus, "Pollard's continued incarceration is due to horrible stupidity".

=== Official requests for clemency ===
Yitzhak Rabin was the first Israeli premier to intervene on Pollard's behalf; in 1995, he petitioned President Bill Clinton for a pardon.

At a critical juncture in the Israeli-Palestinian peace negotiations at the Wye River Conference in 1998, Premier Benjamin Netanyahu attempted to make the outcome contingent on Pollard's release. "If we signed an agreement with Arafat, I expected a pardon for Pollard", he wrote. Clinton later confirmed in his memoir that he tentatively agreed to the condition, "but I would have to check with our people". When that information was made public, the American intelligence community responded immediately, with unequivocal anger. Seven former Secretaries of Defense—Donald Rumsfeld, Melvin R. Laird, Frank C. Carlucci, Richard B. Cheney, Caspar W. Weinberger, James R. Schlesinger and Elliot L. Richardson—along with several senior congressional leaders, publicly voiced their vigorous opposition to any form of clemency. Central Intelligence Agency director George J. Tenet initially denied reports that he had threatened to resign if Pollard were to be released, but eventually confirmed that he had. Other Clinton advisors, including Madeleine Albright and Sandy Berger, were "adamantly opposed" to clemency as well. Dennis Ross confirmed Clinton's version of events in his book The Missing Peace.

Clinton, who had not expected such forceful opposition, told Netanyahu that Pollard's release could not be a condition of the Wye River Conference agreement, and ordered a formal review of Pollard's case. According to Clinton, Inc. by Daniel Halper, Netanyahu also attempted to exert pressure during the conference by referencing intercepted recordings of Clinton's conversations with Monica Lewinsky. Around that time, Insight magazine reported that Israeli intelligence had compromised secure communications at the White House, though the scope of the breach remained uncertain.

Another Israeli request was made in New York on September 14, 2005, and refused by President George W. Bush. A request that Pollard be designated a Prisoner of Zion was rejected by the High Court of Justice of Israel on January 16, 2006. Another appeal for intervention on Pollard's behalf was rejected by the High Court on March 20, 2006.

On January 10, 2008, the subject of Pollard's pardon was again brought up for discussion, this time by Premier Ehud Olmert, during President George W. Bush's first visit to Israel as president. Subsequently, this request was refused by President Bush. The next day, at a dinner attended by several ministers of the Israeli government (in addition to US Secretary of State Condoleezza Rice), the subject of Pollard's release was again discussed. This time, however, Premier Olmert commented that it was not the appropriate occasion to discuss Pollard's fate.

As President Bush was about to leave office in 2009, Pollard himself requested clemency for the first time. In an interview in Newsweek, former CIA director James Woolsey endorsed Pollard's release on two conditions: that he show contrition and refuse any profits from books or other projects associated with the case. Bush did not pardon him.

The New York Times reported on September 21, 2010, that the Israeli government (again under Netanyahu) proposed informally that Pollard be released as a reward to Israel for extending by three months a halt to new settlements in occupied territories.

On January 24, 2011, Netanyahu submitted the first formal public request for clemency in the form of a letter to President Obama. In 2012, President Shimon Peres presented to Obama a letter signed by 80 Israeli legislators, requesting Pollard's release on behalf of the citizens of Israel. In November 2013, Jewish Agency chairman Natan Sharansky said, "It is unprecedented in the history of the US that someone who spied for a friendly country served even half the time [that Pollard has] in prison."

During late March 2014, US Secretary of State John Kerry reportedly offered to release Pollard as an incentive to Israel to resume negotiations with the Palestinians toward the formation of a Palestinian state. The White House, however, announced that no decision had been made on any agreement involving Pollard.

In October 2014, Elyakim Rubinstein, an Israeli Supreme Court Justice, former attorney general, and the acting Israeli ambassador to the US at the time of Pollard's arrest, advocated for Pollard's pardon. He said "Mistakes were made, mainly by the Israelis, but by the Americans as well, and 29 years [is] enough."

In a November 2014 letter to President Obama, a group of American officials, including former CIA director James Woolsey, former Assistant US Defense Secretary Lawrence Korb, and former US National Security Advisor Robert McFarlane, criticized the "unjust denial of parole" for Pollard whose "grossly disproportionate sentence continues". They termed the charge used to keep him imprisoned "patently false".

==== Opposition ====
Critics allege that Pollard's espionage, which compromised elements of four major intelligence systems, damaged American national security much more than was ever publicly acknowledged. They have charged that he was motivated not by patriotism or concern for Israel's security, but by greed; that Israel paid him well, and he spent the money on cocaine, alcohol, and expensive meals. Many intelligence officials are convinced that at least some of the information Pollard sold to Israel was acquired eventually by the USSR, although officials interviewed by investigative journalist Seymour Hersh acknowledged that they had no good evidence. In 1999, Hersh summarized the case against Pollard in The New Yorker.

Four former directors of Naval Intelligence—William Studeman, Sumner Shapiro, John L. Butts, and Thomas Brooks—issued a public response to the call for clemency, and what they termed "the myths that have arisen from this clever public relations campaign ... aimed at transforming Pollard from greedy, arrogant betrayer of the American national trust into Pollard, committed Israeli patriot":

Pollard pleaded guilty and therefore never was publicly tried. Thus, the American people never came to know that he offered classified information to three other countries before working for the Israelis and that he offered his services to a fourth country while he was spying for Israel. They also never came to understand that he was being highly paid for his services.

Pollard and his apologists argue he turned over to the Israelis information they were being denied that was critical to their security. The fact is, however, Pollard had no way of knowing what the Israeli government was already receiving by way of official intelligence exchange agreements ... Some of the data he compromised had nothing to do with Israeli security or even with the Middle East. He betrayed worldwide intelligence data, including sources and methods developed at significant cost to the U.S. taxpayer. As a result of his perfidy, some of those sources are lost forever.

Another claim Pollard made is that the U.S. government reneged on its bargain not to seek the life sentence. What is not heard is that Pollard's part of the bargain was to cooperate fully in an assessment of the damage he had done and to refrain from talking to the press prior to the completion of his sentencing. He blatantly and contemptuously failed to live up to either part of the plea agreement ... It was this coupled with the magnitude and consequences of his criminal actions that resulted in the judge imposing a life sentence ... The appellate court subsequently upheld the life sentence.

If, as Pollard and his supporters claim, he has "suffered enough" for his crimes, he is free to apply for parole as the American judicial system provides. In his arrogance, he has refused to do so, but insists on being granted clemency or a pardon.

Shapiro stated that he was troubled by the endorsements by Jewish organizations for Pollard: "We work so hard to establish ourselves and to get where we are, and to have somebody screw it up ... and then to have Jewish organizations line up behind this guy and try to make him out a hero of the Jewish people, it bothers the hell out of me."

Ron Olive, retired Naval Criminal Investigative Service, directed the Pollard investigation. In his 2006 book, Capturing Jonathan Pollard: How One of the Most Notorious Spies in American History Was Brought to Justice, Olive wrote that Pollard did not serve Israel solely, but admitted passing secrets to South Africa, and to his financial advisers, and to shopping his access to Pakistan and other countries. Olive wrote that Pollard also stole classified documents related to China that his wife used to advance her personal business interests and attempted to broker arms deals with South Africa, Argentina, Taiwan, Pakistan, and Iran. Pollard's advocates deny these claims (Note: Perhaps the most painful and insidious of the slurs that has repeatedly been hurled against him is the claim that Jonathan first offered to sell classified material to South Africa and Pakistan, and only after they turned him down did he begin supplying material to Israel ... Nowhere in this lengthy document does it even hint that Pollard attempted to sell classified information to Pakistan or South Africa, and it quotes Pollard – who had been polygraphed extensively during his post-arrest interrogations – as being motivated by a concern over Israel's security, as American officials "failed to follow established disclosure guidance by withholding information releasable to Israel".) citing the 166 page CIA Damage Assessment Report which they say indicates he only passed information to Israel pertaining to Israeli security. Pollard wrote in his defense memorandum that his wife never profited from his espionage. The reports were declassified in 2012.

New Republic editor Martin Peretz also argued against freeing Pollard: "Jonathan Pollard is not a Jewish martyr. He is a convicted espionage agent who spied on his country for both Israel and Pakistan(!) — a spy, moreover, who got paid for his work. His professional career, then, reeks of infamy and is suffused with depravity." Peretz called Pollard's supporters "professional victims, mostly brutal themselves, who originate in the ultra-nationalist and religious right. They are insatiable. And they want America to be Israel's patsy."

Former FBI and US Navy lawyer M.E. "Spike" Bowman, a top legal adviser to navy intelligence at the time of Pollard's arrest who had intimate knowledge of the Pollard case, issued a detailed critique in 2011 of the case for clemency. "Because the case never went to trial, it is difficult for outside observers to understand the potential impact and complexity of the Pollard betrayal", he wrote. "There is no doubt that Pollard was devoted to Israel. However, the extent of the theft and the damage was far broader and more complex than evidenced by the single charge and sentence." In his estimation, Pollard "was neither a US nor an Israeli patriot. He was a self-serving, gluttonous character seeking financial reward and personal gratification."

In September 2011, according to one report, Vice President Joe Biden—who was chairman of the Senate Judiciary Committee at the time of Pollard's arrest—told a group of rabbis, "President Obama was considering clemency, but I told him, 'Over my dead body are we going to let him out before his time. If it were up to me, he would stay in jail for life'." Biden later denied having used those precise words, but acknowledged that the report characterized his position accurately.

== Parole ==
On July 28, 2015, the United States Parole Commission announced that Pollard would be released on November 20, 2015. The US Justice Department informed Pollard's legal team that it would not contest the Parole Commission's unanimous July 7 decision.

The terms of release set by the Parole Commission stipulated that Pollard must remain on parole for a minimum of five years. His parole restrictions required him to remain in New York City unless granted special permission to travel outside. His parole officer was also authorized to impose a curfew and set exclusion zones within the city. He was ordered to wear electronic monitoring devices to track his movements. In addition, press interviews and Internet access without prior permission were prohibited. Pollard's attorneys appealed the conditions to the Parole Commission's appeals board, which eliminated only one restriction, that of requiring prior permission to use the Internet. However, it was ruled that his Internet use would be subjected to monitoring. Pollard's attorneys and Ayelet Shaked, Israel's Justice Minister, urged President Obama to exercise his powers of clemency to waive Pollard's parole requirements and allow him to relocate to Israel immediately; but a spokesman for the White House's National Security Council announced that the president would not intervene.

After his release on November 20, 2015, as scheduled, Pollard relocated to an apartment secured for him by his attorneys in New York City. A 7:00 pm to 7:00 am curfew was imposed on him. A job offer, as a research analyst at a Manhattan investment company, was retracted due to the inspections to which his employer's computers would be subjected. His attorneys immediately filed a motion challenging the terms of his parole, arguing that the Internet restrictions rendered him unemployable as an analyst, and the GPS-equipped ankle bracelet was unnecessary, as he was not a flight risk. The filing included affidavits from McFarlane and former Senate Intelligence Committee member Dennis DeConcini declaring that any secrets learned by Pollard thirty years ago were no longer secret, and had no value today. On August 12, 2016, a federal judge denied the motion on the basis of a statement from James Clapper, the director of US National Intelligence, asserting that contrary to the MacFarlane and DeConcini affidavits, much of the information stolen by Pollard during the 1980s remained secret. The judge also cited Pollard's Israeli citizenship, obtained during his incarceration, as evidence that he was indeed a flight risk.

A bill introduced in the Knesset in November 2015 would, if passed, authorize the Israeli government to fund Pollard's housing and medical expenses, and pay him a monthly stipend, for the remainder of his life. Reports that the Israelis had already been paying Pollard and his ex-wife during his incarceration were denied. After numerous delays, the bill was withdrawn from consideration in March 2016 at the request of Premier Netanyahu and Israeli security officials, citing "diplomatic and security reasons".

During March 2017, Pollard's attorneys petitioned the United States Court of Appeals for the Second Circuit to reverse the August 2016 lower-court decision denying his request for more lenient parole restrictions. They argued that the prohibition against leaving his residence between 7 pm and 7 am forced him to violate Shabbat and Jewish holidays, and that surveillance of his computers prevented him from working at a job consistent with his education and intelligence. They further asserted that Pollard could not possibly remember information he saw before his arrest, and in any case, the parole conditions arbitrarily limited his computer usage, but not his ability to transfer information by other means. Netanyahu also reportedly renewed his request for a parole waiver during a meeting with Vice President Mike Pence. In May 2017, the court rejected the appeal, ruling that the parole conditions minimized the risk of harm he continued to pose to US intelligence.

On November 20, 2020, Pollard's parole restrictions expired. The US Justice Department refused to extend the restrictions.

== Emigration to Israel ==
Although Pollard expressed a desire to relocate to Israel, he did not immediately do so after his parole expired due to his wife's health issues, and remained in the US for over a month while she underwent chemotherapy for breast cancer. Pollard and his wife, Esther, finally arrived in Israel on December 30, 2020, on a private jet owned by US billionaire Sheldon Adelson. They were greeted on arrival by Israeli Premier Benjamin Netanyahu, who handed Pollard his Israeli documentation. Israeli Intelligence Minister Eli Cohen said that Pollard would be granted a government stipend equivalent to the pensions granted to former Mossad and Shin Bet agents. In accordance with COVID-19 restrictions, they went into quarantine for two weeks after their arrival. Pollard and his wife settled in Jerusalem. Esther Pollard died on January 31, 2022. She had been hospitalized for two weeks after contracting COVID-19.

Pollard was honored by Mayor of Jerusalem Moshe Lion at a Jerusalem Day gala in 2021. Pollard gave the main address to the gala, in which he accused the US government of anti-Semitism, termed the U.S State Department and the United Nations enemies of Israel, and referred to the Biden administration as "Amalek".

Pollard refused an offer to campaign for the Knesset on the Otzma Yehudit party's electoral slate in the 2022 Israeli legislative election, saying that he had "suffered enough".

During mid-September 2022, Pollard announced his engagement to Rivka Abrahams-Donin, a widowed mother of seven children. They married on October 20.

On November 23, 2023, Pollard posted on X (formerly Twitter) that Israel should have arrested the families of Israeli hostages taken by Hamas during the Gaza war to prevent them from interfering in Israel's war plans. In February 2024, he advocated moving the entire Arab population out of Gaza, preferably to Ireland, adding that "the Irish deserve it".

On November 20, 2025, The New York Times reported that Pollard had a private meeting with the US Ambassador to Israel, Mike Huckabee, at the American Embassy in Jerusalem in the past July. Pollard confirmed that the meeting occurred, characterizing it as "friendly" and stating that the "main purpose" of the meeting was to thank Huckabee for his vocal support for Pollard while he was incarcerated. Karoline Leavitt stated that the White House had not been notified of the meeting, but that President Trump "stands by" Ambassador Huckabee.

=== Political activity ===
In May 2026, Pollard announced that he intended to enter politics and seek election to the Knesset, stating that his goal was to "unify the right". He advocated annexing the Gaza Strip, forcibly removing its Palestinian population and resettling the territory with Israelis. Pollard initially became involved with Orot HaShachar, a political initiative being formed with Nissim Louk, the father of Shani Louk, who was murdered in the Nova music festival massacre. In an interview accompanying his announcement, Pollard apologized for his espionage, calling it a mistake and saying that he had failed to consider its consequences. He said that he wished he had found a legal way to address his concerns about Israel's security and expressed remorse for the political and social consequences of his actions. Later that month, Pollard said that he had withdrawn from the election after receiving death threats.

That same month, in a podcast with Arutz Sheva, Pollard stated that Israel might attack Egypt and Turkey in the near future and suggested that after the war with Iran, Israel would have "to be prepared" for further wars in the Middle East. In an interview with Israeli news channel ILTV on August 23, Pollard called on Israel to wipe Iran “off the map.” He said, “We have the resources, we just don’t have the willingness to go ahead and take Iran off the map.” Pollard also criticized Israel's dependence on the United States, stating that Israel had become "an American auxiliary" rather than an independent state. He called for an "Israel First doctrine" centered on military self-sufficiency and independent strategic decision-making, while arguing that successive Israeli governments had become overly constrained by American pressure.

On August 23, 2026, Pollard announced that he had joined Sharren Haskel's newly formed Israel First party. In a joint appearance with Haskel at the Western Wall, Pollard said that Israel needed a new government committed to preserving the country and its people, and criticized political leaders for failing to accept responsibility for the October 7 attacks. Initial reports described Pollard as intending to run for the Knesset on the party's electoral slate. On September 8, however, Israel First announced that Pollard would remain a member of its leadership but would not stand as one of its candidates in the election.

== In popular culture ==
Pollard's story inspired the movie Les Patriotes (The Patriots) by French director Éric Rochant in which American actor Richard Masur portrayed a character resembling Pollard. Pollard's story inspired the stage play The Law of Return by playwright Martin Blank, which was produced Off-Broadway at the 4th Street Theater NYC. Blank is also developing a screenplay for the film adaptation of the play.

Beit Yonatan, an Israeli-owned apartment building in Silwan, a neighborhood in East Jerusalem, is named after Pollard.

Street artist Solomon Souza added Pollard's portrait to his collection of spray paint art at the Mahane Yehuda Market after Pollard's release.

In 1995, a play named Pollard (alternatively titled Pollard's Trial) debuted at the Cameri Theatre in Tel Aviv. It was performed at the Knesset in 2011. The part of Pollard was played by Israeli actor Rami Baruch.

In 2012, SHI 360 released the song "Yonathan". (Note: The hip-hop style song is interspersed with sound bytes from TV news and other sources about the case. 'He's serving life in prison for a crime for which the average sentence is four or five years,' SHI 360 stated. 'I'm not trying to claim he's innocent, but he should be release. He's done his time.')

In the 1994 novel The Fist of God by Frederick Forsyth, the recent case of Pollard's espionage is a source of mild tension between the Mossad and the CIA.

== See also ==
- Israeli espionage in the United States
- Yosef Amit (1945–2025) — Israeli convicted in 1987 for spying on Israel for the United States.
- Ben-Ami Kadish (1923–2012) — former US Army mechanical engineer, admitted passing classified US documents to Israel during the 1980s.
- Steven John Lalas (born 1953) — former State Department communications officer, sentenced to 14 years in prison for passing sensitive military and diplomatic information to Greece.
- Israel Beer (1912–1966) — Austrian-born Israeli citizen convicted of espionage for the former USSR.
- Marcus Klingberg (1918–2015) — Israeli scientist and the highest ranking Soviet spy ever caught in Israel.
- Rafi Eitan (1926–2019) — Israeli politician and intelligence officer.

== Sources ==
- Olive, Ronald J. (2006). Capturing Jonathan Pollard: How One of the Most Notorious Spies in American History Was Brought to Justice. Annapolis, Maryland: Naval Institute Press. ISBN 978-1-59114-652-0.
- Blitzer, Wolf (1989). Territory of Lies. New York: Harper & Row. ISBN 978-0-06-015972-6.
- Henderson, Bernard R. (1988). Pollard: The Spy's Story. New York: Alpha Books. ISBN 978-0-944392-00-3. Henderson is the father of Pollard's wife, Anne
- Thomas, Gordon (1999). Gideon's Spies: The Secret History of the Mossad (2012 edition). Macmillan Publishers
