= Israeli espionage in the United States =

Intelligence gathering

Israeli espionage in the United States refers to clandestine intelligence-gathering and operations conducted by or on behalf of the State of Israel within the territory of the United States and/or against the government of the United States. Despite a close bilateral alliance, multiple incidents since Israel's foundation that Israeli intelligence agencies (such as Mossad, Shin Bet, Aman, and the now-defunct LAKAM) have actively collected American political, military, scientific, and economic secrets.

U.S. counterintelligence officials consistently rank Israeli espionage as among the most active on American soil, alongside larger countries such as France, China and Russia. In 1951, Mossad and the Central Intelligence Agency agreed not to spy on each other and US and Israeli services cooperated closely since then. Nevertheless, there were strong indications afterwards of ongoing Israeli espionage against the United States, confirmed by the 1985 arrest of Israeli spy Jonathan Pollard, one of the most damaging security leaks in US history.

== History ==
=== Early operations (1940s–1960s) ===
Even before Israel's establishment, Zionist operatives in the U.S. ran clandestine networks to obtain arms and information. During the late 1940s, Haganah agents and sympathizers smuggled war material to Jewish forces in Palestine in defiance of U.S. embargoes. FBI investigations led to a few convictions, though most offenders avoided prison. These early operations laid the foundation for an Israeli intelligence presence in America: a secret "underground" coordinated by a small board including Israeli diplomats and a roving Israeli "troubleshooter." By the early 1950s, U.S. authorities suspected numerous instances of Americans (often Jewish-Americans sympathetic to Israel) passing classified information to Israeli contacts, though prosecutions were rare in those years.

In the 1950s, espionage frictions periodically surfaced. Notably, in 1954, a U.S. Army investigation accused Col. Chaim Herzog, Israel's military attaché in Washington (and future Israeli president), of attempting to recruit a Jordanian embassy guard to spy for Israel. The FBI also found that Israeli intelligence had cultivated sources inside the U.S. government: one State Department officer was caught sharing information and was quietly pushed out of service amid allegations of aiding Israeli agents. Around the same period, U.S. officials discovered Israeli eavesdropping devices in the U.S. embassy in Tel Aviv and thwarted an Israeli Shin Bet attempt to blackmail an Arab-American employee of the U.S. consulate in Jerusalem. In the infamous 1954 Lavon Affair, Israeli agents in Egypt (without U.S. knowledge) bombed American and British cultural facilities in a bungled covert operation, straining Israel's relations with Washington.

By the mid-1950s, concerned about spiraling counterespionage, CIA leadership sought an understanding with Israel to curb mutual spying. James Jesus Angleton, the CIA's chief of counterintelligence, had served as the CIA's liaison to Israel from 1951 onward and was instrumental in establishing a secret intelligence-sharing pact. Under this unofficial détente, the CIA agreed not to target Israel, and Israel ostensibly pledged likewise. Israeli Foreign Minister Avigdor Lieberman later asserted that Israel decided "a long time ago not to spy on the U.S." In practice, however, Israeli espionage in the U.S. did not cease; it merely became more circumspect for a time. U.S. counterintelligence officials continued to view Israel as a friendly service – one whose activities were often downplayed or handled quietly to avoid political fallout.

=== Scientific and nuclear espionage (1960s–1970s) ===
Israel's drive to secure a technological edge – particularly its secret nuclear weapons program – led to intensified espionage in the 1960s. In 1960, Israel's Ministry of Defense created the Scientific Liaison Bureau (abbreviated LAKAM in Hebrew) specifically to acquire scientific and technical information from abroad, especially from the United States. A CIA report from the era noted LAKAM gave "top priority" to collecting U.S. scientific intelligence. During the Cold War, U.S. security officials privately ranked Israel as "the second most active" intelligence service on American soil (surpassed only by the Soviet Union). Israel's focus was on obtaining military technology and dual-use items that it could not readily buy, often using covert methods and front companies. Another priority was the surveillance of Arab-American and Palestinian activists in the US, with the Israelis allegedly cooperating with the CIA and the FBI.

One of the most consequential suspicions of this era is the NUMEC affair (sometimes called the Apollo affair). In the mid-1960s, more than 200 pounds of weapons-grade highly enriched uranium went missing from a nuclear fuel plant operated by the Nuclear Materials and Equipment Corporation (NUMEC) in Apollo, Pennsylvania. Circumstantial evidence led U.S. intelligence to suspect an Israeli operation: NUMEC's president, Zalman Shapiro, was a Zionist leader with close ties to Israeli officials. According to a former CIA station chief in Tel Aviv, the NUMEC plant was "an Israeli operation from the beginning," allegedly funneling nuclear material to Israel's nascent atomic weapons project. Declassified reviews have been inconclusive – a secret 1978 GAO report (only released decades later) found no "substantive proof" due to CIA and FBI refusals to share all evidence. Nonetheless, the GAO acknowledged "circumstantial information" pointing to diversion, and later expert studies by former U.S. nuclear regulators concluded the missing uranium "ended up in Israel" for its first nuclear bombs. The NUMEC case remains officially unresolved, buried by successive U.S. administrations for its political sensitivity, but it is widely believed that Israeli agents (possibly with Shapiro's help) spirited the material to Dimona in the 1960s.

Throughout the 1960s and 1970s, Israel used clandestine networks to obtain other critical U.S. technology. During this period, Arnon Milchan, later a famous Hollywood film producer, served as an important Israeli agent. Recruited in the 1960s by LAKAM, Milchan eventually operated some 30 front companies across 17 countries to acquire sensitive technology and materiel for Israel. He worked under LAKAM spymasters like Benjamin Blumberg and Rafi Eitan (the latter would later run the Pollard spy ring). One of Milchan's key operations involved procurement of krytrons – high-speed electronic switches that can be used as triggers for nuclear bombs. Between 1979 and 1983, Milchan's brokerage firm, Heli Trading Co., helped arrange the illegal export of 800 krytrons from a California company (Milco) to Israel's Ministry of Defense. U.S. authorities eventually indicted the owner of MILCO, Richard Kelly Smyth, on dozens of counts of smuggling these devices without export licenses. Smyth fled the country in 1985 after being released on bail and resurfaced in Israel, effectively escaping U.S. justice. An FBI investigation later revealed that Milchan had orchestrated the krytron procurement scheme (code-named "Project Pinto") and that a young Benjamin Netanyahu (then an Israeli diplomat) was involved in the logistics at Heli Trading. Milchan himself publicly admitted in 2013 that he spent years as an undercover operative purchasing technology for Israel's nuclear program.

=== The Pollard Affair and 1980s spy scandals ===
Israeli espionage reached a high-profile peak in the mid-1980s, shattering assumptions that the allies "do not spy on each other". In 1985, U.S. Navy intelligence analyst Jonathan Jay Pollard was arrested for spying on the United States on behalf of Israel – the most damaging public Israeli espionage case in the US to date. Pollard had begun handing over classified documents to an Israeli officer in June 1984, motivated by a mix of ideological conviction (he claimed the U.S. was withholding vital intelligence from Israel) and financial reward. Over 18 months, Pollard provided Israel with an astonishing volume of U.S. secrets – so much that the full inventory remains classified. By his own admission, he made biweekly "drops" of documents in Washington, which were photocopied at a safe-house and returned. He ultimately passed an estimated 800+ highly classified documents and over 1,500 signal intelligence summaries to Israel. These included U.S. intelligence on Arab and Soviet military capabilities (e.g. Syrian air defenses, the Iraqi nuclear program, PLO headquarters locations, Soviet arms shipments) and even a U.S. assessment of Israel's own military strength. Notably, Pollard's handlers from LAKAM primarily sought data on Middle Eastern adversaries, not U.S. secrets per se.

Regardless of Israel's targeting intentions, Pollard's espionage seriously compromised U.S. security. U.S. officials also feared some of Pollard's trove might be traded by Israel to the Soviet Union – a concern fueled by known Soviet penetrations of allied intelligence during the Cold War. He divulged extremely sensitive sources and methods; then-Defense Secretary Caspar Weinberger asserted that "It is difficult for me, even in the so-called 'year of the spy,' to conceive of a greater harm to national security." Pollard was arrested in November 1985 after his activities raised suspicions, and he was caught trying to seek asylum at the Israeli embassy in Washington. The scandal gravely embarrassed Israel. It initially claimed Pollard was part of a "rogue" operation, not approved by top leadership – a characterization widely doubted by investigators. In 1987, Pollard pleaded guilty and received a life sentence, the first American ever to be jailed for life for spying on a U.S. ally. He served 30 years in prison before being paroled in 2015; upon his parole's expiry, Pollard emigrated to Israel in 2020, where he was welcomed and personally thanked by Prime Minister Benjamin Netanyahu.

Concurrent with Pollard, other Israeli spy intrigues of the 1980s came to light. For instance, in 1986 U.S. authorities exposed the Inslaw affair, a convoluted saga involving stolen software and alleged Israeli involvement. Inslaw Inc., a small Washington DC software firm, accused the US Department of Justice of illegally seizing its case-management program PROMIS and distributing it to foreign intelligence agencies. According to a 1992 House Judiciary Committee report, officials in DOJ conspired to steal PROMIS and funnel it via cutouts to allies and possibly adversaries. One key figure was alleged to be Rafi Eitan (the same LAKAM spymaster who ran Pollard). In 1983, Eitan (using the alias "Dr. Ben Orr") was given a demonstration of PROMIS at Inslaw's office and left with a copy of the software. Inslaw's owner later identified the visiting "Dr. Orr" as Eitan, then Israel's anti-terror intelligence chief. Investigators believe the stolen PROMIS was enhanced by Israel to function as a Trojan horse: Israeli engineers reportedly inserted a secret backdoor that allowed Mossad to surreptitiously extract data from any organization that installed the software.

Through cutouts, the bugged PROMIS software was then sold around the world – including to intelligence and security agencies in countries like China, Russia, India, and others. British media mogul Robert Maxwell (father of Ghislaine Maxwell) allegedly acted as a key middleman in these sales, reaping millions in profits. Maxwell was also able to sell the bugged Israeli version of PROMIS to Sandia National Laboratories and Los Alamos National Laboratory, two of the most important nuclear research and national security facilities in the United States. He is said to have been assisted by John Tower, who died in 1991 in a plane crash. Former Mossad officers and journalists have claimed that Maxwell had been an asset of Israeli intelligence since the 1970s and was instrumental in the global spread of the bugged PROMIS software. Maxwell died mysteriously in 1991, fueling conspiracy theories that he was assassinated by Mossad when he threatened to expose the operation in a bid to stave off his own financial ruin. It should be noted however that the U.S. Justice Department's own review in the 1990s denied many of Inslaw's allegations and found "no credible evidence" of a government conspiracy.

By the late 1980s, the accumulation of scandals prompted Israel to officially disband LAKAM and pledge not to spy on the United States again. In 1987, Israel formally apologized for Pollard and assured Washington that there would be no more spying on U.S. soil. Many observers, however, remained skeptical. A Defense Department counterintelligence memo in 1995 still bluntly labeled Israel a "non-traditional adversary" – controversially suggesting that Israeli intelligence sometimes leverages ethnic ties to American Jews in its operations. This internal memo was leaked and caused outrage; the Pentagon hurriedly disavowed it.

=== Continuing espionage and recent incidents (1990s–2020s) ===
In the post-Cold War and post-9/11 eras, Israel has remained on the list of countries aggressively collecting intelligence in the United States. A 1996 CIA report (released to Congress) publicly named Israel, along with France, as being "extensively engaged in espionage" against U.S. interests. Throughout the 1990s, numerous espionage allegations surfaced but often did not lead to prosecutions, likely due to political sensitivities. In 1997, for example, news broke that a U.S. naval officer, David A. Tenenbaum, had unknowingly passed classified data to Israeli liaisons during routine cooperation. The FBI investigated Tenenbaum (who is Jewish) on suspicions of being an Israeli spy, but he was never charged; the case raised delicate questions of dual loyalty and ethnic profiling.

In 2002, news outlets reported that federal agents had detained or questioned dozens of young Israeli nationals (posing as art students) suspected of spying on U.S. government facilities. A leaked DEA memo described a pattern of Israeli "art students" visiting secure buildings and even the homes of federal agents under suspicious circumstances. The DOJ never publicly prosecuted any espionage in that case, and some observers dismissed it as an urban myth. A 2002 Fox News investigation (by Carl Cameron) and a Le Monde report lent credence to the notion of an Israeli surveillance network operating in the U.S. in the lead-up to the September 11 attacks, some of them in close proximity to the later 9/11 hijacker. In 2002 several officials dismissed reports of a spy ring and said the allegations were made by a DEA agent who was angry that his theories had been dismissed. On September 11, five suspicious Israelis (Mossad agents, according to The Forward) were arrested in New York, who apparently reacted joyfully to the attacks. These "dancing Israelis" played a prominent role in 9/11 advance-knowledge conspiracy theories. After an two-month investigation with interrogations of the suspects, the FBI concluded that the five men had no prior knowledge.

One of the most significant spy cases of the 2000s was the AIPAC espionage scandal (2004–2005). In this affair, Pentagon analyst Lawrence Franklin passed classified U.S. policy documents regarding Iran to two staffers of the pro-Israel lobbying group AIPAC, who in turn were accused of relaying the information to Israeli diplomats. The AIPAC officials, Steven Rosen and Keith Weissman, were indicted under the Espionage Act – a virtually unprecedented prosecution of lobbyists for spying. The indictment alleged that Rosen and Weissman conspired to obtain U.S. defense secrets and deliver them to Naor Gilon, the political officer at Israel's Washington embassy. Franklin, the Pentagon source, pleaded guilty in 2005 and was sentenced to 12 years (later reduced) for unauthorized disclosure. However, the case against the AIPAC officials collapsed in 2009 when the Justice Department dropped all charges, citing court rulings that made conviction unlikely (the court required proving the defendants intended specific harm to U.S. national security, a high bar). A side controversy erupted when it was revealed that Rep. Jane Harman had been recorded on an NSA wiretap promising an Israeli agent that she would try to intervene on the AIPAC defendants' behalf, in exchange for help securing a committee chairmanship.

In the 2010s, evidence of Israeli spying on U.S. government communications emerged in at least two instances. In 2015, the Wall Street Journal revealed that U.S. counterintelligence detected Israel eavesdropping on the confidential Iran nuclear negotiations between Iran, the U.S., and other powers. The U.S. reportedly intercepted Israeli communications that confirmed Israel had obtained privileged details of the talks – information American officials believed could only have come from espionage, such as electronic surveillance of negotiation venues or penetration of delegations. According to that report, the Obama administration was less angered by the spying per se than by Israel's subsequent use of the stolen information: Israeli officials allegedly fed U.S. lawmakers selective intelligence from the Iran talks in an effort to sabotage the emerging agreement. "It is one thing for the U.S. and Israel to spy on each other," an American official told the WSJ, "It is another thing for Israel to steal U.S. secrets and play them back to U.S. legislators to undermine U.S. diplomacy".

Later, in 2019, another espionage incident came to light: surveillance devices were found near the White House and other sensitive locations in Washington, DC, with U.S. intelligence determining Israel was likely responsible. The devices, known as StingRays or IMSI catchers, mimic cell phone towers and can intercept calls and texts. A forensic analysis by the FBI and DHS linked the equipment to Israeli agents, according to three former U.S. officials. The devices appeared intended to monitor the cellphones of President Donald Trump and his top aides. When the story (originally broken by Politico) became public, Israel flatly rejected the accusation as a "blatant lie," reiterating its official policy against spying in the U.S. The Trump administration chose not to publicly rebuke Israel. One former official said the reaction under Trump was far more muted than it would have been under any other administration. President Trump himself said he found it hard to believe Israel was behind the spy devices. The FBI, Secret Service, and other agencies declined to comment on the record, and the matter was largely dropped without formal action.

In the 2020s, attention turned to the case of Jeffrey Epstein, the American financier and convicted sex offender, and his alleged connections to Israeli intelligence. After Epstein's 2019 arrest (and subsequent death in jail under disputed circumstances), speculation arose that his sex-trafficking and possible blackmail scheme might have been abetted by a foreign intelligence service. Epstein was long closely associated with Ghislaine Maxwell, the daughter of Robert Maxwell (called "Israel's Superspy"). Epstein's main financial patron was billionaire Leslie Wexner, who gave Epstein control over vast assets in the late 1980s. Wexner was a co-founder of the "Mega Group," an informal network of pro-Israel philanthropists and businessmen formed in 1991, possibly connected with Israeli intelligence circles. Epstein was also closely associated with Ehud Barak, former Israeli prime minister and commander of military intelligence. Israeli officials, including former prime minister Naftali Bennett, have forcefully denied claims of Epstein being an Israeli agent as "categorically false" conspiracy theories. The millions of documents the United States released in 2026 (Epstein files) do not indicate conclusively that Epstein worked for the Mossad.

==== 2024–2026 Israeli–United States espionage cases ====
Israel and the United States have previously acknowledged and tolerated the respective presence of espionage in both countries.

During the 2026 Iran War, "senior IDF officials entered top-secret US command centers, senior US military officials entered Israeli command centers, and a large number of US military aircraft were operating out of Ben-Gurion Airport," according to The Jerusalem Post.

In 2025 and 2026, several proposed laws to alter and expand the US-Israeli security relationship were introduced in the United States Congress.

- The United States-Israel Defense Partnership Act of 2025, to "increase defense-related cooperation between the United States and Israel."
- Section 224 of the 2027 National Defense Authorization Act (NDAA), which contains provisions for the United States-Israel Defense Technology Cooperation Initiative.
- Section 622 of the 2027 Intelligence Authorization Act, which contains provisions to expand US-Israeli intelligence sharing.
- 2026 Netanyahu Resolution supporting the adoption of a new U.S.-Israel Memorandum of Understanding.

In June 2026, the Pentagon’s Defense Intelligence Agency raised the counterintelligence threat assessment for Israel to "critical", the highest level. The Pentagon's Defense Intelligence Agency (DIA) published the new counterintelligence threat assessment in the weeks before the story was published, posting an internal message raising the level to critical. The assessment came from concerns that Israel is surveilling top US officials to gain access to information on the Trump Administration's internal decision making on the Middle East conflicts, including the Iran War. The seven page assessment includes a list of incidents that heightened the Pentagon's concerns. An additional report outlined expanded Israel efforts to eavesdrop on senior US officials, Steve Witkoff, President Trump’s top negotiator, Elbridge A. Colby, the Pentagon’s top policy official, and one of his main deputies, Michael P. DiMino IV.

The New York Times subsequently published an investigation into additional reports of increased Israel espionage against US officials beginning in late 2024 under the Biden Administration and continuing into the Second Trump Administration. The reports concluded Israel had expanded surveillance of senior US officials, including Steve Witkoff, Elbridge Colby, and Michael P. DiMino. Witkoff is a senior negotiator on the Iran War ceasefire. Both Colby and DiMino have advocated for a shift in the US-Israel relationship and advocated for a rebalancing of US defense priorities away from the Middle East. The New York Times reported the DIA assessment had been published following "incidents in which American defense personnel in Israel detected that software to tap their communications had been surreptitiously installed on their phones.

A spokesperson for the Embassy of Israel in Washington denied the allegations, saying "Israel does not gather intelligence on American entities, let alone US government officials," adding, "Israel intelligence collection efforts are aimed at its enemies, not its allies. Any claims to the contrary are either misinformed or politically motivated."

The White House denied the allegations, telling NBC News the story was "false and sourced to someone who doesn’t have any knowledge of what’s going on."

In an opinion piece in Ynet, Kobby Barda criticized the timing of the reports, writing "It is highly noteworthy that anonymous intelligence-community "sources" chose to leak the information precisely as Congress is considering Section 224 as part of the National Defense Authorization Act (NDAA) for fiscal year 2027."

On June 8, 2026, when asked about the reports of Israeli espionage in the US by Fox News’s Jesse Watters, Vice President JD Vance said, "The Israelis and I, excuse me, the Israelis and the United States, we have a lot of shared interests, but we also have some situations where our interests diverge."

== Political espionage ==
Israeli political espionage in the United States typically involves attempts to gather confidential information on U.S. diplomatic or policymaking processes, or to influence those processes covertly. Targets have included U.S. government officials, Congress, and even the White House. Unlike military or economic espionage (which seek technical data or material), political spying is often about gaining strategic insight or leverage, for instance, learning U.S. negotiating positions, or influencing American legislators and decision-makers to favor Israeli interests. One long-running objective of Israeli intelligence has been to monitor U.S. attitudes and plans toward the Middle East. From Israel's perspective, such collection is deemed vital to its security; as Ronen Bergman (an Israeli journalist) noted, Israeli leaders feel justified in tasking spies to find out what the U.S. might concede in negotiations that could affect Israel.

An early example occurred in 1948: U.S. secretary of state George Marshall complained that Israeli delegates at the U.N. somehow knew the instructions President Truman had given the U.S. delegation on a sensitive Palestine vote "almost as soon" as Washington had sent them. Indeed, Israel's Abba Eban admitted his information came from an "unimpeachable source" – suggesting an Israeli agent in the U.S. government. During the 1950s, Israeli embassy personnel in Washington continued to cultivate sources in the State Department and Pentagon. The 1954 Herzog case involved Israel's military attaché seeking classified data on a neighboring Arab army, and possibly receiving cover from a sympathetic U.S. official in the process. Although Herzog was quietly allowed to leave at tour's end, the incident showed that Israel was actively recruiting informants for political-military intelligence even as early as the 1950s.

In more recent times, Israeli political espionage often entails electronic surveillance. The 2015 Iran nuclear talks spying episode is a prime example: U.S. counterspies believed Israel intercepted communications (likely via signals intelligence or cyber means) among U.S. and other delegations. Additionally, Israel possibly placed agents or devices close to the negotiations (e.g. bugging hotels, as a related report suggested Israeli-linked malware targeted the hotels hosting the talks). Israel then allegedly used the gleaned information in an influence campaign – briefing friendly U.S. lawmakers to lobby against the impending Iran deal, creating a conflict with the Obama administration. In 2019, Israel allegedly tried to spy on the White House and sensible places in Washington.

There have also been recurring, if unverified, reports of Israeli efforts to blackmail or influence U.S. politicians. Aside from the Epstein theory (discussed above) of sexual-blackmail operations, one historical anecdote involves the Clinton-Lewinsky scandal. A few reports suggested Mossad had obtained tapes of President Bill Clinton's intimate conversations and used them to pressure the U.S. In another case, the FBI in the 1990s investigated whether an Israeli listening device had been found on a secure phone at the State Department, fueling rumors Israel bugged diplomatic communications. The investigation, known as the "MEGA" affair, never publicly named a culprit, and Israel strongly denied any bugging of State Department lines. There was speculation about a spy or spy network in the State Department called Mega, which could be placed even higher up than Pollard.

Finally, Israel is known to keep a very close watch on U.S. domestic political currents that affect Israeli interests. Israeli diplomats and intelligence officers monitor Congress and elections (overtly and covertly) to anticipate shifts in U.S. Middle East policy. Counterintelligence reports often noted unusual Israeli interest in the workings of the National Security Council and Pentagon policy shops. One former U.S. security official was quoted as saying that "No foreign country has a more effective informational network inside our Congress than Israel does".

== Military espionage ==
Military and defense espionage has arguably been the centerpiece of Israeli spying efforts in the U.S. since 1948. Israel, a small nation surrounded by neighbors, has always sought to compensate by securing cutting-edge weaponry and intelligence – even, at times, through theft or clandestine acquisition from the United States. This category includes stealing classified military technology, obtaining U.S. intelligence on Middle Eastern adversaries, and infiltrating defense institutions. A 1996 General Accounting Office investigation concluded that "Israel conducts the most aggressive espionage operations against the United States of any U.S. ally," especially in stealing "classified military information and sensitive military technology. According to reports, some obtained US military secrets ended up in the hands of US rivals. In the 1980s Israel allegedly traded certain U.S. weapons data to the USSR in exchange for the release of Soviet Jews.

Beyond Pollard, other American officials have been caught or accused of spying for Israel's defense benefit. In 1985, just months after Pollard's arrest, another U.S. naval intelligence officer, Michael S. Schwartz, came under investigation for passing sensitive documents to the Israelis in the early 1990s. Schwartz ultimately was not prosecuted (reportedly due to diplomatic considerations) but quietly resigned from the Navy. In 2006, U.S. authorities charged a former Pentagon analyst, Ben-Ami Kadish, for espionage he committed back in the 1980s. Kadish, an American engineer at the Army's Picatinny Arsenal, admitted that from 1979 to 1985 he gave an Israeli agent classified manuals on U.S. missile defense systems, nuclear weapons design, and the F-15 fighter jet. Astonishingly, the same Israeli handler (scientific attaché Yosef Yagur) ran Kadish and Pollard simultaneously in the 1980s. Kadish cooperated with investigators in 2008 and, due to age (85) and a plea deal, received only a fine and no jail time for acting as an Israeli spy on U.S. soil decades earlier.

Israeli military espionage has also targeted U.S. defense technology and industrial secrets. Since the 1960s, Israel has used clandestine methods to obtain designs and components for advanced weaponry that the U.S. either refused to export or sold in limited quantities. For example, in the 1970s, Israel covertly obtained plans for the Patriot missile system and other technologies via third parties and returning students. The LAKAM agency specialized in such theft of high-tech data. It would recruit Israeli scientists and defense industry employees to go on "shopping trips" in the U.S., often under the cover of joint research or academic exchange, and then skim restricted information during lab visits. Foreign spies frequently abuse visits to U.S. military facilities – taking photos, sneaking unauthorized colleagues into meetings, and exploiting hospitality to extract sensitive know-how. In a 1990s report, Israel was singled out: dozens of Israeli scientists had been visiting U.S. nuclear weapons labs under cooperative programs, and "opportunities for inappropriate behavior were considerable". In one 20-month period in the late 1980s, 188 Israeli scientists toured U.S. nuclear labs, often getting more open access than other foreign nationals due to Israel's ally status.

Israeli agents have also been implicated in smuggling U.S. weapon components and armaments, including to adversaries such as Russia. During the 2000s a spate of U.S. criminal cases involved Israeli or dual-national middlemen attempting to illicitly purchase U.S. military hardware for export to Israel without licenses. Many such cases ended in quiet plea deals or deportations, suggesting political sensitivity. The FBI and Customs have routinely listed Israel among the countries that attempt to obtain U.S. defense items through front companies.

== Economic espionage ==
Israel has also conducted extensive economic espionage in the United States – i.e. stealing or illicitly acquiring commercial, scientific, or high-tech secrets for economic gain. Israeli economic espionage often overlaps with military objectives (many technologies have dual civilian-military uses), but it also includes purely commercial targets such as advanced computing, telecommunications, aerospace, and other industries where Israel seeks a competitive edge. This pattern has been documented since the country's founding and has sometimes drawn sharp criticism from U.S. officials, given that Israel is a major recipient of U.S. economic aid. According to the Institute for Palestine Studies, economic espionage against America has been "aggressive" since 1948, vital in helping Israel "sustain and modernize" its military and high-tech sectors (including its nuclear program) at the expense of U.S. companies' intellectual property. In the early statehood years when Israel lacked an advanced industrial base, Israeli agents obtained sensitive chemical formulas, agricultural patents, and aviation designs from U.S. firms (sometimes via Jewish emigrants returning to Israel). By the 1980s and 1990s, Israel's high-tech economy was burgeoning, boosted by know-how from the U.S. and other countries often acquired covertly.

The cost of Israel's economic espionage to the United States is hard to quantify but believed to be significant. The stolen or copied technologies have saved Israel years of R&D and millions of dollars. A 1993 GAO report cited by analyst Duncan Clarke noted that Israel's motivations include not just bolstering its own industry but also reselling or trading U.S.-origin tech to other countries for profit and diplomatic gain.

There have been suspicions that Israel's intelligence services sometimes spy on U.S. corporations to benefit Israeli companies in trade negotiations or to gain investment advantages. In one case reported by Newsweek in 2014, U.S. officials accused Israel of "crossing red lines" by using cyber espionage to obtain proprietary information from American firms, including those involved in energy and medical technology. Joint trade missions or front companies controlled by Israeli intelligence agencies are apparently being used to steal secrets. Israel heavily recruits Israeli or Jewish-American students and scientists in sensitive fields to act as eyes and ears. Israel denied these claims, but multiple U.S. intelligence assessments have ranked Israel as a top offender in economic spying among allies.

== US-Israeli intelligence sharing ==
=== Cold war ties ===
U.S.-Israeli intelligence ties date back to Israel's founding. In 1951, CIA Counterintelligence chief James Angleton established a formal liaison channel with the Mossad, which he managed personally for over two decades. Angleton, who had befriended Jewish underground operatives during WWII, became an ardent champion of Israel in the CIA. Under his aegis, Israeli liaisons were given unusual access and trust. By one account, Angleton "almost single-handedly ran the Israeli account at CIA" until 1974. He viewed Israel as a bulwark against Soviet influence in the Middle East and shared with Mossad extensive U.S. intelligence (e.g., on Arab military plans). In return, Israel proved a valuable ally. During the Cold War, Israel's intelligence provided the U.S. with captured Soviet weaponry and intelligence that the U.S. otherwise had little access to. For example, after the 1967 Six-Day War and 1973 Yom Kippur War, Israel handed over to the U.S. numerous Soviet-made tanks, planes, radar systems, and missiles seized from Arab armies. Studying this equipment greatly helped the Pentagon develop countermeasures. Israel also obtained a copy of Nikita Khrushchev's secret 1956 speech denouncing Stalin and shared it with the CIA, which was a major intelligence find at the time.

Throughout the 1960s, the CIA and Mossad cooperated in anti-Communist operations. One declassified document notes that as U.S. ties with pro-Western Muslim countries like Iran and Turkey fluctuated, Mossad became a key conduit for CIA activities in the region. For instance, when the CIA lost its station in Egypt after 1967, it relied on Israeli intelligence for updates on Egyptian military moves. In Africa and Latin America, Israel sometimes acted as a proxy assisting pro-U.S. regimes, with CIA knowledge. This tight bond led to the oft-quoted notion that "the CIA and Mossad are so close, they don't have to spy on each other". That said, the cooperation had limits and hiccups – the 1967 USS Liberty incident stands as a grim exception. During the Six-Day War, Israeli forces mistakenly (as Israel maintains) attacked a U.S. signals intelligence ship, killing 34 American crew. Some in the U.S. intelligence community suspected it was no mistake, perhaps an Israeli attempt to blind U.S. surveillance during sensitive operations.

Under Ronald Reagan, the military and strategic partnership with Israel intensified significantly in the 1980s. His CIA director, William Casey, was considered the most pro-Israel leader of the CIA to date.

=== Post-Cold War and War on Terror ===
After the Cold War, while concerns grew about Israeli espionage, operational cooperation still deepened on new fronts. In the 1991 Gulf War, Israel shared with the U.S. real-time intelligence on Iraqi Scud missile launches and allowed the U.S. to deploy Patriot batteries in Israel, which required coordination of sensitive friend-or-foe codes. Post-9/11, Israel became an important partner in counter-terrorism. Israeli intelligence (Shin Bet and Aman) had decades of experience monitoring Islamist militants. They provided the U.S. with intelligence on groups like Hamas, Hezbollah, and al-Qaeda's regional presence. Israel also aided U.S. military operations during the U.S. invasion of Afghanistan (2001) and Iraq (2003) and gave advice on operations. As John Brennan reflected, "As good as CIA is, we can't be everywhere... Israel has eyes and ears in places we depend on". The CIA and Mossad also co-developed high-tech tools. Notably, the Stuxnet cyber-operation around 2010 – a covert attack on Iran's nuclear centrifuges – was reportedly a joint U.S.-Israeli effort (with NSA and Unit 8200 collaborating). A 2013 Snowden-leaked document revealed that the NSA has a special arrangement giving Israel access to raw intelligence feeds, including some data on U.S. persons – an arrangement that raised eyebrows but underscored trust and close cooperation at technical levels.

== See also ==
- Chinese espionage in the United States
- Russian espionage in the United States
