= National Defense Authorization Act for Fiscal Year 2027 =

Proposed US federal statute

- Long title: To authorize appropriations for fiscal year 2027 for military activities of the Department of Defense, for military construction, and for defense activities of the Department of Energy, to prescribe military personnel strengths for such fiscal year, and for other purposes.
- Acronyms (colloquial): NDAA 2027
- Announced in: the 119th United States Congress

Legislative history
- Introduced in the House as H.R. 8800 by Mike Rogers R‑AL on May 13, 2026; Passed the House on July 22, 2026 (216-212)

The National Defense Authorization Act for Fiscal Year 2027 (NDAA 2027) is a proposed U.S. federal statute which specifies the budget, expenditures and policies of the U.S. Department of Defense (DOD) for fiscal year 2027. Analogous NDAAs have been passed annually for over 60 years. Senate Democrats have largely opposed the current version of the bill.

== Legislative history ==
=== Senate ===
In a July 2026 "Dear Colleague" letter, Senate Democrats wrote, "As Senate Democrats, we should not be providing votes compelling him (President Donald Trump) to deepen the U.S. relationship with Netanyahu's extremist government." The letter was signed by Chris Van Hollen, Jeff Merkley, Ed Markey, Elizabeth Warren, Peter Welch, and Bernie Sanders. The letter also noted the Intelligence Authorization Act for Fiscal Year 2027, which includes provisions to expand intelligence sharing with Israel.

On July 14, 2026, Senate Democrats blocked a motion to advance the NDAA (50-46). The motion required 60 votes to pass. Senate Minority Leader Chuck Schumer said, about the 2026 Iran war, "Republicans want the Senate to take up the NDAA, the defense bill, as though none of this is happening, as though Congress can debate the nation’s central national security bill while ignoring the nation’s most urgent national security crisis."

=== House of Representatives ===
On June 29, 2026, the House Rules Committee released a list of amendments to the Act ruled "in order" to vote on. The list did not include Amendment 2 introduced by Representatives Ro Khanna and Thomas Massie to strip Section 219 from the Act. Khanna wrote on X, "Congress has blocked the amendment @RepThomasMassie and I introduced to stop the integration of our military with Israel’s." He added, "It is unconscionable to not even have a vote. We will be continuing on and will not be intimidated by the pro-Israel lobby."

In June 2026, the House Armed Services Committee passed the markup of the NDAA 2027.

On July 22, 2026, the $1.15 trillion NDAA was passed by the House of Representatives 216 to 212. Seven Republicans voted against the NDAA, with six Democrats voting in favor.

== Provisions ==
The House's bill would ban gender affirming care, prevent transgender girls from participating in sports at Department of Defense Education Activity schools, require compliance with the Naming Commission, and restore collective bargaining at the Department.

=== United States-Israel Defense Technology Cooperation Initiative ===
The United States-Israel Defense Technology Cooperation Initiative was introduced as the core provision of the United States-Israel FUTURES Act and subsequently incorporated into both House and Senate versions of NDAA 2027. The House version's provision was titled Section 224 and subsequently retitled as Section 219.

Representatives Ro Khanna and Thomas Massie introduced Amendment 2 to the NDAA 2027, which strikes 219 from the Act.

Amendment 2 was subsequently supported by Adam Smith, Ranking Member of the House Armed Services Committee, who had previously supported Section 219. Smith said, "In the context of these ongoing conflicts, Section 224 carries meaning beyond the plain text substance of the provision." He added, "I want to advocate for peace and pressure Israel to meaningfully work with partners in the region to bring these conflicts to an end."

In July 2026, Massie announced plans to re-introduce an amendment removing Section 219 from the Act.

On July 21, 2026, representative Alexandria Ocasio-Cortez wrote that Section 219 was "an existential threat to American sovereignty and democracy" in a social media statement in advance of the House vote on the NDAA. In response to Ocasio-Cortez's statement, representative Mike Lawler wrote "Good grief, you are either obtuse or intentionally lying. We are not merging our military with the IDF. As we do with many of our allies, we enter into cooperative agreements, share intelligence, develop technology and ammunitions, and conduct military exercises together. Stop stoking Jew hatred and do better."

Following the House's passage of the NDAA, Representative Thomas Massie wrote that the bill was "a betrayal of American sovereignty", adding that it "tragically merges our military technology and supply chain with Israel’s."

=== US-Israel joint military projects ===
The NDAA 2027 allocates $750 million to several joint military projects with Israel. According to a statement by AIPAC, the funds include "$500 million for missile defense, $100 million for counter‑unmanned systems, $100 million for subterranean operations, and $50 million for emerging technologies. The bill also extends the War Reserves Stockpile Authority–Israel."

=== Compensation ===
The Trump administration proposed a tiered military pay raise for junior service members. The provision was adopted by the House Armed Services Committee and rejected by the Senate Armed Services Committee.

=== Anti-boycott restrictions ===
Amendment 151 of the NDAA 2027 "Extends existing anti-boycott protections to international governmental organizations (IGOs), such as the UN. These protections are already in place for boycotts instigated by foreign countries." Amendment 362 would require the Secretary of Defense to certify Department of Defense contractors do not participate in the Boycott, Divestment, and Sanctions (BDS) movement targeting Israel.

=== Department of War ===
The House version of the NDAA 2027 included a provision for re-naming the United States Department of Defense to the United States Department of War.

== Reaction ==
Josh Paul, a former State Department official and head of think tank A New Policy wrote that under Section 219, Israel being positioned "to become a supplier to the U.S. military is just a further example of [it] using [its arms] sector as a tool of influence."

=== Support ===
In an opinion for The Jerusalem Post, Meital Stavinsky, president of South Florida Women in Defense, described the NDAA 2027 as a "congressional recognition of this unique relationship", referring to US-Israel military ties. Stavinsky advocated for the upgrading of US-Israel military ties to "a Five Eyes-equivalent or analogous statutory and administrative framework providing greater reciprocity, accelerated technology security review, stronger industrial security pathways, and fully integrated defense industrial cooperation."

In an opinion written by the Editorial board at The Wall Street Journal titled "The Military Danger of the Anti-Israel Panic", the Board criticized Representative Adam Smith's support of Amendment 2 to trip Section 219 from the NDAA 2027, writing, "anyone can see that the politics of Israel have changed in the Democratic Party and even among some Republicans," adding "The rising anti-Israel obsession is a gift to U.S. adversaries."

Following the passage of the House version of NDAA 2027 on July 22, 2026, AIPAC released a statement supporting the bill's pro-Israel measures. The statement wrote, "We applaud the inclusion of a new provision that will help keep America safe and bolster our strategic capabilities — the United States-Israel Defense Technology Cooperation Initiative. This authorizes the Pentagon to work even closer together with Israel in the strategic arenas that will define 21st‑century warfare, ensuring American troops have a greater edge over our adversaries."

=== Opposition ===
A coalition of 14 anti-war organizations, foreign policy, and civil liberty organizations (including the American Civil Liberties Union, J Street, Code Pink and Win Without War) urged lawmakers to oppose the NDAA unless senators were guaranteed a vote on an amendment barring more funds for the Iran war.

In an opinion piece published in progressive news site Common Dreams on July 13, 2026 by Ismail Allison and Robert McCaw of the Council on American-Islamic Relations (CAIR), they wrote "these bills would connect the US and Israeli militaries in unprecedented ways and make it exceedingly difficult for any future president to unwind this partnership with a foreign government."

Writing in his Substack Forever Wars, Spencer Ackerman wrote that, "Should the NDAA pass with Section 219/1217 intact, the aircraft-carrier theory of the U.S.-Israel relationship will become more like a supercarrier. And the point of all this is to reduce the exposure of Israel's American patronage to small-d democratic accountability, similar to how AIPAC floods congressional races with money to insulate its beneficiaries from the concerns of their constituents."

On September 3, 2026, 56 American civil rights and advocacy groups, including Amnesty International USA, National Lawyers Guild, and Arab and Jewish advocacy groups, sent a letter to the House and Senate armed services committees urging the removal of Section 219 from the NDAA. The groups characterized stronger US-Israel military integration as "exceptionally dangerous", writing, "At a time in which American interests are increasingly diverging from those of Israel, and American public opinion is turning increasingly against unconditional support to Israel, creating new points of influence for Israel in the U.S. defense-technology ecosystem is exceptionally dangerous."

== See also ==
- Intelligence Authorization Act for Fiscal Year 2027
- National Security, Department of State, and Related Programs Appropriations Act, 2027
