= National Security, Department of State, and Related Programs Appropriations Act, 2027 =

- Long title: Making appropriations for national security, Department of State, and related programs for the fiscal year ending September 30, 2027, and for other purposes.

Legislative history
- Introduced in the House of Representatives; Committee consideration by United States House Committee on Appropriations

The National Security, Department of State, and Related Programs Appropriations Act, 2027, is a proposed 2026 Act of Congress to fund the United States Department of State and foreign aid programs.

== Provisions ==
=== No Funds for Israel amendment ===
Representative Thomas Massie introduced Amendment #5 (Revised) to the Act to reduce the Foreign Military Financing Program account by $3.3 billion, writing, "none of the funds made available under this Act shall be obligated or expended for Israel." The Congressional Progressive Caucus endorsed the measure.

On June 23, 2026, the amendment was subsequently advanced by the House Rules Committee. The amendment was supported by Representatives Alexandria Ocasio-Cortez and Greg Casar, and opposed by Jim Himes and Greg Landsman. The House vote is scheduled for July 1, 2026.

On July 14, 2026, House Minority Leader Hakeem Jeffries wrote a letter to democratic colleagues outlining his opposition to Massie's amendment, but also wrote "American policy in the Middle East must change." Jeffries described Massie's amendment as "too broad".

In a July 15, 2026 vote, the amendment failed 314 to 104, with 103 Democrats voting in favor, 98 Democrats voting against, and 10 voting present. Massie was the only Republican to vote for the amendment. Politico described the vote as a "seismic shift" in support for Israel in the United States Congress.

"Though my amendment to strike $3.3 billion in aid to Israel from the State Dept Approps bill did not pass, 104 House Members voted in favor of it," Massie wrote on June 15, 2026 on X. "The tide is changing. Americans want their tax dollars to be spent improving things here at home, not waging war and genocide."

=== Ceuta and Melilla ===
In the House Report on the Bill to the House Appropriations Committee, the report states, "The Committee notes that the Spanish-administered cities of Ceuta and Melilla are located in Moroccan territory and remain the subject of Morocco's longstanding claim," adding, "The Committee supports efforts by the Secretary of State to encourage diplomatic engagement between Morocco and Spain on the future status of Ceuta and Melilla."

On August 1, 2026, admits the 2026 Morocco–Spain border incident, Representative Thomas Massie wrote on social media, "Don't fall for the fake Fox/GOP outrage. Two weeks ago the House passed a bill that greenlighted the transfer of Spanish territory to Morocco. Every Republican except me voted for it, but now THEY are acting shocked at the invasion."

On August 3, Massie said, "GOP Congress voted to give Morocco $40 mil and lent credibility to their claim to Ceuta," referencing the bill report's recommendation to continue $40 million in US security assistance for Morocco, including $20,000,000 under National Security Investment Programs and $20,000,000 under the Foreign Military Financing Program.

== Reaction ==
AIPAC described Massie's amendment as a "dangerous amendment", writing in a statement that "We remain committed to strengthening support in Congress among Democrats and Republicans for America’s partnership with Israel."

== See also ==
- 2016 U.S.-Israel Memorandum of Understanding, which annually provides the $3.3 billion in Foreign Military Financing to Israel along with $500 million for missile defense programs ($3.8 billion total annually)
- National Defense Authorization Act for Fiscal Year 2027
- Intelligence Authorization Act for Fiscal Year 2027
