= United States-Israel FUTURES Act =

2026 act

- Long title: United States-Israel Framework for Upgraded Technologies, Unified Research, and Enhanced Security (FUTURES) Act of 2026

Legislative history
- Introduced in the Senate by Ted Budd on February 12, 2026; Committee consideration by United States House Committee on Armed Services; United States House Committee on Foreign Affairs

The United States-Israel Framework for Upgraded Technologies, Unified Research, and Enhanced Security (FUTURES) Act of 2026, also known as the United States-Israel FUTURES Act, is a proposed Act of Congress cosponsored in 2026 by senators Ted Budd and Kirsten Gillibrand in the United States Senate, and Representative Ronny Jackson in the United States House of Representatives, to expand US-Israel military cooperation.

The core provision of the Act, the United States-Israel Defense Technology Cooperation Initiative, was incorporated as Section 224 of the National Defense Authorization Act for Fiscal Year 2027 (NDAA 2027) in the House version of the bill, and subsequently renumbered as Section 219 of NDAA 2027 in the House version, and Section 1217 of NDAA 2027 in the Senate version.

== Provisions ==
=== United States-Israel Defense Technology Cooperation Initiative ===
The bill established the United States-Israel Defense Technology Cooperation Initiative to "expand and accelerate bilateral defense technology research, development, testing, evaluation, integration, and industrial cooperation" between the United States and Israel. The Initiative would be led by an "executive agent" appointed by the US Secretary of War. According to The New Republic, "No other country has this privilege with the U.S. military."

The Initiative also provides for collaboration on emerging technologies, including "artificial intelligence, quantum machine learning and autonomous systems", "directed energy and advanced sensing", "cyber defence, electronic warfare and digital resilience", and "biotechnology, biomanufacturing, and medical defence".

Additionally, the Initiative allows for "network integration" and "data fusion" between both countries' militaries.

== Legislative history ==
Neither the House or Senate version of the bill made it out of committee.

=== Section 224 of the 2027 National Defense Authorization Act (House version) ===
The United States-Israel FUTURES Act did not advance as a standalone bill. Key elements of the Act, including the United States-Israel Defense Technology Cooperation Initiative, were subsequently introduced by representatives Mike Rogers and Adam Smith as Section 224 of the House of Representatives' version of the 2027 National Defense Authorization Act (NDAA). A fact sheet distributed by the House Armed Services Committee described NDAA 2027 as providing "unprecedented levels of support for the security of Israel." According to AIPAC, NDAA 2027 also includes "$750 million for U.S.-Israel cooperative programs—a $65 million increase over FY26."

According to an analysis by the Quincy Institute for Responsible Statecraft, the Initiative "would arguably do more to intertwine the U.S. military with the Israeli military than the more than $200 billion (inflation adjusted) in military assistance Israel has received from the U.S. since its founding in 1948."

In May 2026, representatives Ro Khanna and Thomas Massie both said they would seek to remove Section 224 from the NDAA 2027. In a social media post, Massie wrote, "If the provision in the NDAA to integrate/synchronize the US and Israeli militaries (section 224) makes it out of committee, I’ll offer an amendment to strip it from the bill on the floor,” adding, "We are a sovereign country…"

Khanna wrote on X, "And I will be offering an amendment in the committee itself to strip section 224 out, @RepThomasMassie," adding, "Trump can’t kill the Massie/Khanna partnership no matter how much he posts on Truth Social." Khanna described Section 224 as a "fusion" of the US and Israeli militaries, in order to prevent accountability and scrutiny for US aid to Israel.

On June 2, 2026, Representative Rogers wrote on social media that Section 224 "“simply adds transparency and improves efficiency by designating a single official to coordinate existing initiatives," adding, "In no way does it give away command and control of our military operations, personnel, or equipment." The Republican Jewish Coalition subsequently praised Rogers for "setting the record straight," writing that "Section 224 strengthens American national security by deepening defense-tech cooperation with our closest ally in the Middle East." AIPAC also commended Rogers, thanking him for "prioritizing initiatives that help make America safer and stronger."

Independent senator Bernie Sanders encouraged voters to "defeat Section 224," and former Republican representative Marjorie Taylor Greene wrote that "once sec 224 passes, it will be next to impossible to be undone."

==== House Armed Services Committee markup ====
The House Armed Services Committee debated the measure during its markup of the NDAA on June 4, 2026.

On June 4, 2026, Ro Khanna introduced an amendment to block Section 224. The amendment failed by a voice vote, and now advances to the floor of the House of Representatives. Khanna said, "Everyone in America — whether you’re a Republican, an independent or a Democrat — says that we need to tell Netanyahu that America calls the shots, not the prime minister of any other country,” adding "They want less cooperation and blank checks to Israel, not more. Only the United States Congress would dream up at this moment, ‘Let’s actually do more for Israel.'" Khanna's amendment was co-sponsored by one other Democrat on the committee, representative Sara Jacobs.

Khanna's amendment during the House Armed Services Committee markup was opposed by Democratic representative Adam Smith, who said, "Mr Netanyahu insisted on this war with Iran that has strengthened Iran and weakened our position. I do not like his leadership of Israel or where he is going," but added, "The reason that we have these partnerships with Israel, where we may not have as many developed partnerships with other NATO countries, is because Israel has actually been having to fight."

During the markup hearing, representatives Ronny Jackson and Don Davis challenged Khanna's assertions that Netanyahu had played a role in drafting Section 224.

==== Israeli Government support ====
On June 1, 2026, Prime Minister of Israel Benjamin Netanyahu wrote a letter to representative Marlin Stutzman thanking Stutzman for endorsing "my plan" for a "new framework of joint defense cooperation, codevelopment, coproduction and mutual investment in areas including advanced missile defense, artificial intelligence unmanned systems, cybersecurity and next generation military platforms." Responsible Statecraft described Netanyahu's letter as an endorsement of Section 224 of the NDAA 2027, writing that the Section "essentially transforms Israel from a top U.S. aid recipient to a full member of the U.S. defense and intelligence apparatus."

Stutzman subsequently introduced a nonbonding resolution on June 3, 2026, calling for the US to develop a new MOU with Israel to end the aid the US provides to Israel, and instead have Israel fund its own purchases of US weaponry.

=== Section 219 of the 2027 National Defense Authorization Act (House version) ===
As of June 15, 2026, the Israel Defense Technology Cooperation Initiative was subsequently renumbered to Section 219 of the House version of NDAA 2027.

On June 29, 2026, the House Rules Committee released a list of amendments to the NDAA considered "in order" to vote for. The amendment proposed by representatives Massie and Khanna to strip Section 219 from the NDAA was not listed.

=== Section 1217 of the 2027 National Defense Authorization Act (Senate version) ===
The companion version of Section 219 of the House's version of NDAA 2027 was incorporated into the Senate version as Section 1217.

Senator Bernie Sanders wrote that the section "quietly expands U.S. military cooperation and weapons development with almost zero oversight," adding the section was tantamount to "burying a provision in the defense bill that would give Israel more military integration than any NATO ally."

==== Senate Armed Services Committee markup ====
The US Senate Armed Services Committee held a closed-door markup of its version of NDAA 2027 in June 2026, including the United States-Israel Defense Technology Cooperation Initiative.

A summary of the markup was released on June 11, 2026, with the Senate version differing slightly from House version and original United States-Israel FUTURES Act text. The Senate version also contained congressional authorization for the Civil Military Coordination Center under President Donald Trump's Board of Peace.

== Reaction ==
Mark Hilborne, senior lecturer, the School of Security Studies at King’s College London, wrote to Al Jazeera that the Initiative "suggests a much tighter integration – less about provision and perhaps sharing technologies and capabilities, and more about jointly developing these," adding that "It would point to a more institutionalised relationship, and perhaps one that might survive changing administrations in the US, as some of the development cycles could be very long and would become entrenched."

=== Support ===
The provisions of Section 224 have been described by its co-sponsors as modest, with Adam Smith describing characterizations of the text as "simply not accurate”.Adam Smith, after hearing constituent concerns, stated that he will support Khanna's amendment to strike SEC.219 from the NDAA if the amendment makes it to the floor.

The bill was endorsed by pro-Israel groups, including the 501(c)(4) organization FDD Action, the lobbying arm of the Foundation for Defense of Democracies. In a statement, it wrote "The United States-Israel FUTURES Act builds on decades of successful collaboration by improving cooperation across the public, private, and academic sectors to swiftly develop, test, and field defense technologies that will help safeguard U.S. service members and provide Israel with the means to combat a diverse set of threats from foreign adversarial states and terror groups."

On February 19, 2026, AIPAC endorsed the bill, supporting its "encouraging US-based co-production, joint ventures, and manufacturing partnerships with Israeli industry." In the first quarter of 2026, AIPAC reported lobbying for the bill at the Department of War as well as on Capitol Hill. In a fact sheet published on June 4, 2026, AIPAC wrote that Section 224 is "a critical new provision to strengthen and streamline U.S.-Israel defense technology cooperation."

On June 5, 2026, AIPAC released a press release applauding the House Armed Services Committee's passage of Section 224, along with funds for several US-Israel cooperative programs, writing, "We now encourage the full House to maintain these pro-Israel measures as the NDAA moves toward final passage."

Aaron Kaplowitz, president of the United States-Israel Business Alliance, wrote an opinion in The Washington Post in support of Section 224 underscoring the importance of Israeli-made products in defense supply chains, citing Spain's challenges in boycotting Israeli technology from key defense manufacturers like Airbus.

On June 18, 2026, Middle East Forum fellow Amine Ayoub wrote an opinion piece in The Jerusalem Post titled, "The US can debate AI integration, Israel has already operationalized it", writing that "The next American soldier who benefits from AI-assisted targeting, networked battlefield intelligence, or real-time data processing will owe something to an IDF unit that Congress has never heard of."

=== Opposition ===
A New Policy, a Political Action Committee that describes itself as "dedicated to forging a new U.S. policy toward Israel and Palestine that improves the lives of Americans and people across the Middle East" sponsored a letter to the House Armed Services Committee advocating for the removal of military collaboration with Israel from the 2027 NDAA. A New Policy founder Josh Paul said "What Congress is trying to do now is find different ways of entrenching the relationship so deep in America’s own defence industrial base that it’s impossible to root it out."

Paul subsequently authored a piece on the Arab Center Washington DC's website, writing that "Section 224 raises significant questions about whether there will be, in the foreseeable future, a genuine offramp from support for Israel’s military, or whether the relationship will simply transition to a new, and arguably worse, form."

In a June 4, 2026, interview with Jewish Currents, Paul said that the "off ramp" for US aid to Israel would "seem on the surface to provide a net savings to the US taxpayer and to shift the cost burden for [Israel’s] weapon procurements to Israel." Paul added that,

"Imagine a world in which—as Section 224 proposes—Israeli technology is integrated into U.S. military systems. Last year alone, US Defense Department procurement topped $160 billion, with a further $140 billion spent on research and development. In that context, US foreign assistance is, despite all the hype it gets, relatively small beans. Integrating Israel as a key source into the Department of War supply chain, on the other hand, opens up prospects that could not only make up for, but over time dwarf, the billions in handouts Israel’s military currently gets. And unlike the current grant assistance, which mostly pays for US weapons systems, this would be money going directly into Israel’s economy. And that’s before accounting for the access to emerging US technology and intellectual property that Israel would have access to and be able to spin off for commercial purposes."

On June 5, 2026, following the House Armed Services Committee's passage of Section 224, CAIR released a statement condemning the action, writing, "Section 224 represents a dangerous attempt to permanently fuse elements of the American and Israeli military intelligence and technology in ways that could outlast any single administration, Congress, or political moment."

In a statement, the American-Arab Anti-Discrimination Committee (ADC) wrote that Section 224's "language turns Congress into a vehicle for advancing Netanyahu’s agenda and asks the American people to treat it as their own national security policy."

On June 5, 2026, Eli Clifton and Ian Lustick wrote an opinion in The Guardian describing Section 224 as "a trap being set by Israel and its lobby to bind our country to a state that, for all its past promise, has gone rogue."

In an opinion in The Times of Israel, William Keenan wrote that critics of Section 224 describe the statutory mandate to “synchronize” cooperation as "genuinely uncertain".

Retired Air Force Lt. Col. William Astore expressed concerns about level of integration Section 224 establishes, writing "I can’t think of another example of Congress formalizing integration of critical national security technologies with a foreign power." He also expressed concerns about the AI component of Section 224. Astore said "Israel is a leader in using AI predictive models and programs to surveil and kill people, using manned and unmanned drones," adding, "The ‘smart,’ even autonomous technologies Israel has used against Palestinians could very well be used by the U.S. government against American citizens — especially the so-called radical left that President Trump appears to see as domestic terrorists."

A June 11, 2026, opinion piece in The American Conservative by Harrison Berger wrote that Section 224 would place Israeli components in American weapons systems. Berger wrote, "The presence of foreign components in U.S. systems inherently raises the risk of compromised integrity—a risk sharpened in this case by Israel’s demonstrated willingness and capability to weaponize supply chains, most vividly in the 2024 terror attack that involved the detonation of thousands of pagers that were turned into remote-controlled bombs."

== See also ==
- Israel–United States military relations
- Section 622 of the Intelligence Authorization Act for Fiscal Year 2027, a provision on "United States-Israel Intelligence Sharing Enhancement"
