= 2026 Netanyahu Resolution (119th Congress) =

2026 proposed congressional resolution

- Long title: Expressing the sense of the House of Representatives in support of Prime Minister Benjamin Netanyahu’s initiative to transition the United States-Israel relationship toward mutual defense cooperation and joint economic investment, recognizing the contributions of Israel to joint military operations against Iran, and condemning the global rise of antisemitism.

Legislative history
- Introduced in the House of Representatives by Marlin Stutzman (R–IN) on June 3, 2026; Committee consideration by United States House Committee on Foreign Affairs

H.Res.1339, also known as the 2026 Netanyahu Resolution, is a proposed United States congressional resolution introduced by Representative Marlin Stutzman endorsing and praising Prime Minister of Israel Benjamin Netanyahu's initiative to transition U.S. military aid to Israel from "one of traditional foreign assistance towards a new era of mutual cooperation, joint investment, and shared development".

The proposal did not originate from Congress, instead from Stutzman's conversations with Israeli officials who suggested shifting the current aid framework to defense partnerships and trade agreement.

== Background ==
In a May 10, 2026 interview with CBS News, Benjamin Netanyahu has previously expressed a desire for the United States to begin reducing annual financial assistance to Israel, saying he wants to "to draw down to zero the American financial support".

=== Netanyahu's meeting with Stutzman ===
In May 2026, Stutzman and representative Abe Hamedeh visited Israel, meeting with Prime Minister Benjamin Netanyahu, President Isaac Herzog, and Foreign Minister Gideon Sa'ar. During his May 27, 2026 meeting with Netanyahu, Stutzman presented him with the text of the Resolution, with Netanhayu expressing his support, saying "This is the direction I’ve been wanting to go for a long time," according to a recollection by Stutzman. Stutzman also met with Druze spiritual leader Sheikh Mowafaq Tarif and Lt. Col. Ella Waweya, an Israeli military spokesperson serving as a liaison to Arab media, along with U.S. Ambassador to Israel Mike Huckabee.

On June 1, 2026, Mike Huckabee confirmed the shift in aid in an X post, writing that the new MOU with Israel "ends aid & will be based on trade." Huckabee was responding to criticism from Joe Kent, the former Head of the National Counterterrorism Center.

In a subsequent interview, Stutzman said, "When a couple of folks from Israel floated the idea of going from the supplemental of $38 billion over 10 years to a trade agreement and defense agreement, we just continued to have those conversations."

=== Netanyahu's letter to Stutzman ===
On June 1, 2026, Netanyahu subsequently sent a letter to Stutzman thanking Stutzman for the Resolution, writing, "I was glad to receive your proposed Congressional resolution endorsing my plan to shift the framework for U.S.-Israel defense cooperation from aid to partnership." Netanyahu wrote that Israel "appreciates the financial component of the military aid," adding, "The time has now arrived for us to move from aid recipient to partner."

Responsible Statecraft described Netanyahu's letter as an endorsement of Section 224 of the 2027 National Defense Authorization Act (NDAA), which contained provisions for the United States-Israel Defense Technology Cooperation Initiative, writing that the Section "essentially transforms Israel from a top U.S. aid recipient to a full member of the U.S. defense and intelligence apparatus." Jewish Insider described the letter as "highly atypical".

Following the introduction of the Resolution, in June 2026 Netanyahu said, "I want armaments independence. I deeply appreciate the support we have received, and which I have also brought over the years, from our American friends. Today I say: We need our own independent armaments network. We must manufacture our own armaments."

=== Section 224 of the 2027 NDAA ===
During a House of Representatives markup of Section 224 of the 2027 NDAA, representative Ro Khanna referenced Netanyahu's letter to Stutzman while arguing for a amendment to strip Section 224 from the NDAA. Khanna said the language of Section 224 "directly" follows Netanyahu's language, adding,

"The American people are tired of the arrogance and insolence of Prime Minister Netanyahu telling America what we should do. The entire country of Israel has a GDP that is less than a single town in my district, yet somehow Netanyahu thinks he could tell the American people what we should do."

Khannas's amendment subsequently failed in a voice vote, and Section 224 moves to the floor of the House of Representatives. Representative Thomas Massie has promised to introduce an amendment to strip Section 224 from the 2024 on the House floor.

== Provisions ==
The resolution was introduced on June 3, 2026, co-sponsored by representatives Stutzman and Hamedeh.

The Resolution expresses support for the development of a new U.S.-Israel Memorandum of Understanding (MOU) on military assistance, which would replace the existing MOU.

It resolves,

- "reaffirms the special bond between the United States and the State of Israel, grounded in shared democratic values, mutual security interests, and the deep bonds of friendship between the American and Israeli people;
- commends Prime Minister Benjamin Netanyahu for his bold proposal to transition the United States-Israel relationship away from traditional foreign assistance and toward a new era of mutual cooperation, joint investment, and shared technological development;
- strongly supports the development of a new memorandum of understanding between the United States and Israel to replace traditional military assistance with a framework of joint defense codevelopment, coproduction, and mutual investment that will strengthen both nations’ defense industries and military readiness;
- expresses its gratitude to Prime Minister Netanyahu and the people of Israel for their courageous partnership with the United States in military operations against Iran, which together dealt a historic blow to Iran’s nuclear weapons program and significantly degraded the Islamic Republic’s capacity to threaten United States interests in the region; and
- condemns antisemitism in all its forms, including physical attacks on Jewish individuals and institutions, the harassment of Jewish Americans, the spread of antisemitic propaganda, and the delegitimization of Israel’s right to exist."

== Reaction ==
Following the June 1, 2026 letter sent to Stutzman thanking Stutzman for the Resolution, A New Policy founder Josh Paul wrote that Netanyahu was "reading the room, seeing the very clear direction that American politics are going and asking how can Israel maintain the military-to-military relationship and the security cooperation relationship, but do so in a way that is sheltered from American politics — whether that’s Congress, or American public sentiment writ large."

On June 4, 2026, J Street issued a statement of support for ending United States subsidies to Israel for arms purchases, writing, "J Street welcomes the emerging consensus – in Israel and the United States – that the time has come to rapidly and responsibly end America’s financial subsidies for Israel’s arms purchases."
