= 1948 Ventures =

American venture capital firm

- Type: Venture capital firm
- Industry: Venture capital
- Founded: October 2023
- Founder: Aaron Kaplowitz
- Key people: Aaron Kaplowitz
- Website: 1948.vc

1948 Ventures is a Miami-based venture capital firm focusing on applications for early stage Israeli dual-use technology companies, founded in October 2023 by Aaron Kaplowitz.

== History ==
The firm was founded in 2023, within days of the October 7 attacks, and was named for the year of Israel's founding. Kaplowitz is the president of the United States-Israel Business Alliance.

== Investments ==
1948 Ventures operates with a target check size of $100,000 to $1 million, targeting pre-seed, seed, and post-seed companies.

Investments include:

- Senai, established in 2025 to develop "Online Video Intelligence" (OVINT)
- Argu.ai, an AI-powered surveillance platform
- Cyvore Security, a platform to secure digital workspaces
