= Josh Paul =

Josh Paul may refer to:

- Josh Paul (baseball)
- Josh Paul (musician)
- Josh Paul (U.S. official)
