= Strategic Cooperation Agreement =

Reagan era cooperation agreement between the United States and Israel

The Strategic Cooperation Agreement was concluded on November 30, 1981, between the United States and Israel during the presidency of Ronald Reagan and coincided with an official visit of Israeli Prime Minister Menachem Begin. The agreement was signed by Israeli defense minister Ariel Sharon and U.S. secretary of defense Caspar Weinberger and pledged specific actions from both parties to increase strategic cooperation between them. The main objective was to deter Soviet threats and ‘Soviet controlled forces’ in the Middle East. Israel had aimed for some time at the creation of a more formal bond which would commit the United States to a closer military cooperation. The signing marked the beginning of close security cooperation and coordination between the American and Israeli governments. It was formally reconfirmed at the time of Reagan’s second peace initiative, on April 21, 1988.

The agreement took the form of a Memorandum of Understanding (MoU) and was an act of the executive branch not subject to Senate ratification. Therefore, it was not a treaty, which requires Senate ratification. Formally, it did not constitute an official alliance. Frequent references of the President and political leaders to Israel as an ally did not carry with them the weight of a legal commitment to declare or enter a war on Israel’s side in the sense envisioned by the U.S. Constitution.

Politically, the strategic cooperation agreement represented a major policy shift toward Israel regarding American involvement in the Middle East. Since there was no corresponding pact signed with any Arab state, the United States could no longer claim to act as an impartial mediator or arbiter in the Arab Israeli conflicts.

The full text of the understanding is shown in the links below. Berkely professor George Lenczowski summarized the main points as follows.

- The United States and Israel to form a committee to arrange for joint military exercises and provide for the use of Israeli ports by the Sixth (Mediterranean) Fleet.
- Israel to agree to the pre-positioning on its territory of military supplies for use by the US rapid deployment force.
- The United States to resume the delivery to Israel of American cluster bombs (temporarily suspended).
- Israel to build, with partial US financial assistance, the Lavi fighter aircraft, which it was free to market abroad. (This provision was rescinded a few years later.)
- US aid to Israel for military purposes to be increased by $425 million per year.
- Israel and the United States to conclude a trade agreement that would allow to duty-free and tax-free imports and exports for both countries, giving Israel a preferential treatment in comparison with other US trading partners [at that time].

The agreement was developed after a few weeks of discussions between working groups of the Ministry of Defense and the U.S. Defense Department. with input from the American Israel Public Affairs Committee (AIPAC), particularly their Director of Research and Information, Steve J. Rosen. The strategic cooperation agreement roused much resentment in the Middle East. The Arab world and the Soviet Union were highly critical of this agreement, which they felt would impair America's ability to deal fairly with the peace process in the Middle East.
