= Next U.S.-Israel Memorandum of Understanding =

The next U.S.-Israel Memorandum of Understanding is a proposed security assistance Memorandum of Understanding (MOU) to Israel by the United States that will succeed the 2016 U.S.-Israel Memorandum of Understanding, which expires in FY2028.

According to the Financial Times, negotiations between the US and Israeli governments on the MOU are ongoing. The proposed framework was described as potentially shifting the emphasis from direct U.S. cash grants toward expanded joint defense cooperation, long-term strategic planning, and deeper integration between Israeli and U.S. military structures.

== Background ==
US security assistance to Israel since the Clinton Administration has been governed through Memorandums of Understanding, typically in 10-year installments. The majority of funds from the US to Israel must be spent on the US to support US defense innovation and manufacturing, with limits placed on how much of the funds could be spent inside Israel.

There have been three 10-year frameworks for security assistance to Israel:

- 1998 ($21.3 billion)
- 2008 ($32 billion)
- 2016 ($38 billion)

Since 2016, the 2016 U.S.-Israel Memorandum of Understanding has governed US security assistance to Israel from FY2019-FY2028.

In January 2026, Israeli Prime Minister Benjamin Netanyahu said that over the next decade he was aiming to "taper off" US military aid to Israel. The previous month, he had said Israel would spend ₪350 billion (US$110 billion) on developing an independent arms industry, and "Our goal is to build an independent arms industry for the State of Israel and reduce the dependency on any party, including allies."

== Provisions ==
Discussions on the next MOU between American and Israeli officials began in late 2025, after having been delayed due to the Gaza War. During initial discussions, Israeli officials proposed two changes to the next MOU: extending the agreement from 10 years to 20 years, and using a portion of the allocated assistance to support joint US-Israeli research and development as opposed to direct military aid. According to Axios, the provisons were targeted to appeal to the Trump Administration's "America First" ideology.

In 2026, Prime Minister of Israel Benjamin Netanyahu has called for the winding down of US financial aid to Israel in the next decade.

On June 1, 2026, Netanyahu sent a letter to US Representative Marlin Stutzman expressing support for his planned resolution, writing that Israel "appreciates the financial component of the military aid," adding "The time has now arrived for us to move from aid recipient to partner." Stutzman plans to introduce a nonbonding resolution on June 3, 2026, calling for the US to develop a new MOU with Israel to end the aid the US provides to Israel, and instead have Israel fund its own purchases of US weaponry.

On June 1, 2026, US Ambassador to Israel Mike Huckabee wrote on social media that "New MOU w/ Israel ends aid & will be based on trade."

In the week of June 1, 2026, formal talks on the new MOU between the US and Israel's Defense Ministry began with an inaugural meeting, according to a statement from the Ministry and US Secretary of State Marco Rubio. Future meetings are planned in the coming weeks in both the United States and Israel. The US team will be led by US Ambassador to Israel Huckabee and US State Department Counselor Daniel Holler, and the Israeli team will be led by Defense Ministry Director-General Amir Baram and Israeli Ambassador to the US Yechiel Leiter.

According to the statement, the new MOU is "designed to strengthen the IDF’s qualitative military edge through expanded joint investment in research, development and co-production, deepen the US-Israel partnership demonstrated during [the 2026 US-Israeli campaign against Iran] Operation Roaring Lion, and gradually transition from aid to a completely reciprocal partnership."

The Jerusalem Post wrote that "a new US-Israel defense model is taking shape", shifting towards commercial partnerships where "Israeli and American defense firms are increasingly designing, testing, and producing systems together."

In July 2026, The Jerusalem Post wrote that Israel's government was trying to accelerate MOU negotiations with the US government in advance of the 2026 midterm elections.

== Reaction ==
=== Support ===
The Foundation for Defense of Democracies (FDD) published a policy brief titled "On U.S. Military Aid Phase-Out for Israel, Go Smartly — Not Quickly" in support of the new framework, writing that, "premature FMF [Foreign Military Financing] phase-out, or one that ignores continued threats and important military requirements, could hurt Israel and undermine U.S. interests." The brief also advocated for the US Congress to adopt legislation that would require any administration to certify in writing, as part of the annual budget process, that "any proposed reduction in U.S. FMF for Israel for the next fiscal year is in America’s national security interests."

=== Opposition ===
In November 2025, the Henry L. Stimson Center published a commentary criticizing the proposal of a 20-year MOU as "unprecedented", writing, "For security cooperation to be effective in advancing U.S. interests, it must be responsive, flexible, and tied to the realities of a fast-evolving strategic environment."

On May 26, 2026, the Quincy Institute for Responsible Statecraft published an analysis of the proposed MOU, writing that the it would entail "shifting billions in resources from State Department–administered foreign aid grants into general Pentagon procurement accounts, industrial partnerships, and sustainment pipelines."

Seth Binder of the American Committee for Middle East Rights (ACMER) wrote that “Israel's arms industry has arguably established itself as a competitor” to US defense firms though Israel's usage of Off-Shore Procurement (OSP) to purchase its own armed using US Foreign Military Financing under the 2016 MOU.

== See also ==
- Section 224 of the 2027 National Defense Authorization Act, a provision establishing the "United States-Israel Defense Technology Cooperation Initiative"
- Section 622 of the Intelligence Authorization Act for Fiscal Year 2027, a provision on "United States-Israel Intelligence Sharing Enhancement"
- 2026 Netanyahu Resolution, a resolution in support of Benjamin Netanyahu's initiative to transition US military aid to Israel from "one of traditional foreign assistance towards a new era of mutual cooperation, joint investment, and shared development"
