= Steve J. Rosen =

American lobbyist (1942–2024)

Steven Jack Rosen (July 22, 1942 – October 28, 2024) was an American educator, author, and lobbyist. He served for 23 years as one of the top officials of the American Israel Public Affairs Committee (AIPAC). He was often singled out in writings about AIPAC.

== Personal life ==
Rosen was born on July 22, 1942, in Brooklyn, New York to Leon Rosen and Pauline Dinnerstein. He studied at Hofstra College, where he received his B.A. along with his parents who resumed their education alongside Rosen. He would then receive a Ph.D. from Syracuse University in political science.

In 1962, Rosen married Barbara Schubert, however the two would divorce a year later. Several years later, Rosen and Schubert would reconciled in 2001 and were partners until Rosen's death in 2024. Stephen had three children.

Rosen died on October 28, 2024, at a care facility in Silver Spring, Maryland, from complications of Alzheimer's disease, aged 82.

== Career ==
Rosen taught political science and international relations from 1968 to 1978 at the University of Pittsburgh, Brandeis University and Australian National University. He was coauthor (with Walter S. Jones) of The Logic of International Relations, a best selling textbook that went through four editions from 1974 through 1982.

From 1978 to 1982, he served as associate director of the National Security Strategies Program at think tank RAND Corporation, conducting and supervising research and analysis of classified material under contract with the Pentagon and the US State Department.

=== AIPAC ===
In 1982, Rosen left RAND to join AIPAC, where he served until 2005 as Director of Foreign Policy Issues and was particularly involved in communication with the executive branch including the State Department and the National Security Council.

Rosen is regarded as a major contributor to the growth of AIPAC's influence on the US' Middle East policy during. The New York Times said, "Mr. Rosen, AIPAC's director of foreign policy issues, is ... one of the group's most influential employees, with wide-ranging contacts within the Bush administration and overseas." The Washington Post wrote, "Rosen has been a mainstay of AIPAC and the architect of the group's ever-increasing clout." National Public Radio called him "A larger-than-life figure" (May 20, 2005) who "helped shape AIPAC into one of the most powerful lobby groups in the country" (September 30, 2005). Haaretz said, "In the eyes of many, he is AIPAC itself."

In particular, "Rosen helped pioneer 'executive-branch lobbying,' a style of advocacy that was not widespread when he began it in the mid-1980s, but is now a routine complement to the more traditional lobbying of Congress" according to The Washington Post. The Nation said Rosen is "a brilliant and, some say, ruthless bureaucratic infighter at the country's premiere Mideast lobbying group, who was emboldened by his long relationships with figures in and around the Bush Administration and the Washington scene to behave almost as an unofficial diplomatic entity in his own right" (July 14, 2005). "The special relationship between the US executive branch and AIPAC was the triumph of twenty years of work by … Rosen."

Rosen's early work with the executive branch focused on expanding military cooperation between the United States and Israel. Rosen authored reports such as The Strategic Value of Israel (1982) and Israel and the U.S. Air Force (1983). Columnist William Safire and defense correspondent Drew Middleton credited one of Rosen's reports with helping to launch the U.S.–Israeli dialogue that resulted in the Strategic Cooperation Agreement during early the Ronald Reagan administration. The Washington Post later said (June 14, 1991): "[Rosen] helped convince key members of the Reagan administration that the Jewish state was a U.S. 'strategic asset' in the struggle with the Soviets. … Rosen helped encourage more cooperation than the two countries had ever enjoyed." A New Yorker profile (July 4, 2005) said: "Rosen used his contacts to carry AIPAC’s agenda to the White House. An early success came in 1983, when he helped lobby for a strategic cooperation agreement between Israel and the United States, which was signed over the objections of Caspar Weinberger, the Secretary of Defense, and which led to a new level of intelligence sharing and military sales." The Times said (July 6, 1987), "AIPAC cannot take sole credit. … But Mr. Rosen has reportedly worked to flesh out the strategic cooperation. … Despite initial opposition in the Pentagon, the relationship has become institutionalized."

A major focus of Rosen's efforts in the 1990s was Iran. Rosen and his codefendant in the AIPAC/Franklin case Keith Weissman were among the first to advocate a strategy of graduated American economic sanctions for leverage against Iran's alleged involvement in sponsoring terrorism and its purported acquisition of nuclear weapons capabilities. Milestones in this campaign were President Bill Clinton's March 14, 1995 Executive Order banning Conoco from investing in Iranian oil and gas production; his May 8, 1995 Executive Order extending this to all U.S. companies; and enactment of the Iran and Libya Sanctions Act (ILSA) on August 4, 1996. The Executive Orders and ILSA (later the Iran Sanctions Act) were the foundation of a Bush Administration effort to get multilateral cooperation for stepped up economic pressure to end the Iranian uranium enrichment program.

Another key issue in Rosen's work for AIPAC was U.S. policy toward the Israeli–Palestinian conflict. Rosen was an ardent proponent of the view that U.S. recognition of and relations with Palestinian organizations should be conditioned on their renunciation of terror and violence, their willingness to make peace and their compliance with signed agreements. Rosen also argued, in a 1985 AIPAC monograph titled "The Importance of the West Bank and Gaza to the Security of Israel", that U.S.-brokered negotiations over territory and borders should include provisions to secure Israel from threats that might arise in areas under Palestinian control.

At the height of the failed 1990s peace process, he was criticized by followers of Israel's leading dove, Yossi Beilin, for expressing doubts that the Palestinians would honor their commitments. He was also criticized by some on the pro-Israel right for his view that Israel's Palestinian policy should be decided by its elected government, not by pro-Israel organizations abroad. AIPAC-watchers often describe Rosen as a "security hawk" on the pro-Israel spectrum, though he did not in principle oppose territorial compromise or a two-state solution if the necessary conditions could be achieved.

==== Espionage prosecution ====
On August 27, 2004, CBS News reported, "A spy is working for Israel at the Pentagon… The suspected mole supplied Israel with classified materials…passing classified information…to two men at AIPAC, and on to the Israelis...[including] a presidential directive on U.S. policy toward Iran." On screen, CBS showed an image of a document titled "Presidential Directive: U.S. Policy Toward Iran," and a file folder marked "classified" passing from a man labeled "suspected spy" to a box marked with the AIPAC logo and from there to Israel as symbolized by its flag. The same day, Federal Bureau of Investigation (FBI) agents, accompanied by media camera crews, raided AIPAC offices with a warrant to inspect the paper and electronic files of Steven Rosen.

This led to intense worldwide media attention to the allegation that AIPAC was enmeshed in a major espionage program. Critics of AIPAC and Israel saw validation for their thesis that pro-Israel advocacy is inimical to the American national interest. In The Israel Lobby and U.S. Foreign Policy (2007), for example, John Mearsheimer and Stephen Walt write that, although countries spying on their allies is common enough to be "neither surprising nor particularly reprehensible, ... [n]onetheless, the close relationship between Washington and Jerusalem has made it easier for Israel to steal American secrets, and it has not hesitated to do just that. At the very least, Israel's willingness to spy on its principal patron casts further doubt on its overall strategic value, especially now that the Cold War is over."

Pentagon official Lawrence Franklin was indicted on May 26, 2005, and Rosen and Weissman were indicted on August 4, 2005.

The prosecution was brought under various sections of the Espionage Act, for example 18 U.S.C. § 793. Some of the laws had been in effect since 1917. One provision under which Rosen and Weissman were indicted—section 793(e)—was added in 1950 under the McCarran Internal Security Act. The case largely hinged on a telephone conversation between the two men and Washington Post reporter Glenn Kessler.

=== Indictment ===
The indictment of Rosen and Weissman, filed in Alexandria, Virginia on August 4, 2005, alleges that:

"Between in or about April 1999 and continuing until on or about August 27, 2004, in the Eastern District of Virginia and elsewhere, defendants Lawrence Anthony Franklin, Steven J. Rosen, and Keith Weissman did unlawfully, knowingly and willfully conspire, confederate and agree together and with others, known and unknown to the Grand Jury, to commit the following offenses against the United States:

1. "having lawful possession of, access to, and control over information relating to the national defense, did willfully communicate, deliver and transmit that information directly and indirectly to a person or persons not entitled to receive it, having reason to believe that said information could be used to the injury of the United States and to the advantage of any foreign nation, a violation of Title 18, United States Code, Section 793(d); and
2. "having unauthorized possession of, access to, and control over information relating to the national defense, did willfully communicate, deliver and transmit that information directly and indirectly to a person or persons not entitled to receive it, having reason to believe that said information could be used to the injury of the United States and to the advantage of any foreign nation, a violation of Title 18, United States Code, Section 793(e)."

=== Failed conspiracy allegations ===
The indictment stated:

1. "It was part of the conspiracy that, in an effort to influence persons within and outside the United States government, Rosen and Weissman would cultivate relationships with Franklin and others and would use their contacts within the U.S. government and elsewhere to gather sensitive U.S. government information, including classified information relating to the national defense, for subsequent unlawful communication, delivery and transmission to persons not entitled to receive it.
2. "It was further part of the conspiracy that Franklin would use his position as a desk officer in the Office of the Secretary of Defense to gather information relating to the national defense, for subsequent unlawful communication, delivery and transmission to Rosen and Weissman and others not entitled to receive it.
3. "It was further part of the conspiracy that Franklin, Rosen and Weissman would meet at locations in the Eastern District of Virginia and elsewhere, to exchange information, including classified information relating to the national defense.
4. "It was further part of the conspiracy that Franklin would unlawfully deliver, communicate and transmit classified national defense information in an effort to advance his own personal foreign policy agenda and influence persons within and outside the United States government.
5. "It was further part of the conspiracy that Rosen and Weissman, without lawful authority, would communicate to persons not entitled to receive it, classified information relating to the national defense."

=== Prosecutors drop charges ===
On May 1, 2009, prosecutors announced they would ask the judge to dismiss the cases against Rosen and Weissman because of "the diminished likelihood the government will prevail at trial under the additional intent requirements imposed by the court and the inevitable disclosure of classified information that would occur at any trial." An appeals court had ruled that the defense could use classified information at trial and a lower-court judge had ruled that prosecutors had to show that the two men knew that the information they allegedly disclosed would harm the United States, which The Washington Post described as "a high burden for prosecutors".

Weissman lawyer Baruch Weiss said that defense lawyers "were able to put together an array of experts to demonstrate to the government that the information" the men were accused of passing along was "innocuous."

== Later career ==
On November 3, 2008, the Jewish Telegraphic Agency reported that Rosen was working for the Middle East Forum (MEF), a think tank directed by scholar Daniel Pipes. Rosen blogged on the MEF website, devoted to Obama Administration personnel and policy. In November 2008, Rosen gave a presentation for MEF titled "Wishful Thinking and Iran."

== See also ==
- Keith Weissman
- Israel lobby in the United States
- Glenn Kessler
