= List of U.S. officials who resigned over Biden's support for Israel in the Gaza war =

A number of U.S. staff, including officials who worked closely on the arms trade and human rights policy, have resigned over the Biden administration's continued arms transfers to Israel for its war in Gaza. A group of staff members resigned amidst anger in the country over Biden's support for Israel.

In a joint statement entitled "Service in Dissent", the resigned officials wrote that:

America's diplomatic cover for, and continuous flow of arms to, Israel has ensured our undeniable complicity in the killings and forced starvation of a besieged Palestinian population in Gaza. This is not only morally reprehensible and in clear violation of international humanitarian law and U.S. laws, but it has also put a target on America's back.

Resigned officials who spoke to CNN stated that unnamed and non-confirmed former colleagues felt the same way but could not afford to resign. The officials included Lily Greenberg Call, Harrison Mann, Hala Rharrit, Maryam Hassanein, Mohammed Abu Hashem, Riley Livermore, Alexander Smith, Stacy Gilbert, Anna Del Castillo, Annelle Sheline, Tariq Habash, Josh Paul, and Andrew Miller.

== Background ==
Critics called on Biden to freeze US arms sales as leverage against Israel to halt its military operations. The Leahy Act prohibits aid to foreign military units involved in crimes, and Section 620(I) of the Foreign Assistance Act states that no aid shall be provided to any government that "prohibits or otherwise restricts, directly or indirectly, the transport or delivery of United States humanitarian assistance".

In November 2023, more than 1,000 officials at the United States Agency for International Development signed an open letter asking Biden to call for ceasefire.

== Resigned officials ==
=== Lily Greenberg Call ===
Lily Greenberg Call, Special Assistant to the U.S. Department of the Interior's Chief of Staff, was the first Jewish political appointee to resign in protest at United States support for Israel in the Gaza war. She wrote she quit because "as a Jew I cannot endorse the Gaza catastrophe." She condemned Biden in her comments, including one in which he warned "there wouldn't be a Jew in the world who was safe" without Israel. "He is making Jews the face of the American war machine. And that is so deeply wrong".

=== Harrison Mann ===
In May 2024, U.S. Army officer Harrison Mann made public that he had left the military and the Defense Intelligence Agency (DIA) the previous November because of the "moral injury" caused by United States support for Israel in the Gaza war and the damage done to the Palestinians. He said he kept quiet for months about his reasons for resigning out of fear. Mann said he felt shame and guilt for helping advance U.S. policy that he said contributed to the mass killing of Palestinians. "The policy that has never been far from my mind for the past six months is the nearly unqualified support for the government of Israel, which has enabled and empowered the killing and starvation of tens of thousands of innocent Palestinians," he wrote.

=== Hala Rharrit ===
Hala Rharrit, a U.S. diplomat and veteran Foreign Service officer and the State Department's spokeswoman for the Middle East and North Africa, resigned on April 25, 2024, in opposition to the U.S. policy in Gaza. She stated, "More bombs, more killings is not the answer".

=== Maryam Hassanein ===
Maryam Hassanin, who was a special assistant to the Ministry of Interior, resigned from her job on July 2, 2024. She strongly criticized Biden's foreign policy, describing Israel's war against various Palestinian groups as "genocide". She wrote, "When my family and I, alongside other Muslims and Arab Americans, turned up to vote for President Biden in 2020, it was because the Biden campaign promised justice. That promise and faith in the administration has been shattered."

=== Mohammed Abu Hashem ===
Mohammed Abu Hashem, a Palestinian American, announced in June that he was ending his 22-year career in the U.S. Air Force. He said he lost relatives in Gaza in the ongoing war, including an aunt who was killed in an Israeli airstrike in October. In an interview with the Washington Post, he said that it was "extremely emotional" for him to know that "the amount of bombs that are being supplied to Israel was the cause of her death."

=== Riley Livermore ===
Riley Livermore, who was a U.S. Air Force engineer, said in mid-June 2024 that he was stepping down. "I don't want to be working on something that can turn around and be used to slaughter innocent people".

=== Alexander Smith ===
Alexander Smith, a USAID contractor, said he was forced to choose between resigning or being fired after preparing a speech on maternal and child mortality among Palestinians, which USAID canceled shortly before it was to be delivered. In his resignation letter, he wrote, "I cannot do my job in an environment in which specific people cannot be acknowledged as fully human, or where gender and human rights principles apply to some, but not to others, depending on their race."

=== Stacy Gilbert ===
Stacy Gilbert, a State Department official with over 20 years of experience in refugee crises, resigned in May 2024 following the release of a joint State-DOD report to Congress that concluded that Israel was not blocking humanitarian assistance. Gilbert, the Senior Civil-Military Advisor in the State Department's refugee bureau, had been one of the subject matter experts drafting the report the White House requested (National Security Memorandum #20, "NSM-20"). The State Department removed subject matter experts from the report at the end of April 2024, and Gilbert saw the final report when it was submitted to Congress on May 10, 2024. While the report was the first official admission that the U.S. government believed Israel was using U.S. weapons inconsistent with International Humanitarian Law (also known as the Law of Armed Conflict), the report went on to conclude that Israel was not blocking humanitarian assistance. Gilbert said this contradicted what humanitarian organizations working in Gaza and the U.S. Government's own experts had been reporting for months. According to Gilbert, the State Department made that "patently, demonstrably false" conclusion to avoid triggering another U.S. law, Section 620I, which requires the U.S. to halt weapons transfers to a country if that country is found to be obstructing humanitarian assistance. In her resignation letter she said, "As death, disease, displacement, and destruction escalates in Gaza, that report will haunt us."

=== Anna Del Castillo ===
Anna Del Castillo, deputy director of the White House Office of Management and Budget, left her post in April 2024, becoming the first known White House official to leave the administration over Gaza policy.

=== Annelle Sheline ===
State Department official Annelle Sheline resigned in March 2024 from the State Department's Bureau of Democracy, Human Rights and Labor, in opposition to Biden's policies toward Israel, saying that Biden administration was breaking U.S. law by continuing to arm Israel and covering up evidence the U.S. has seen of Israeli human rights abuses. She said she believed Israel was clearly "in violation of so many laws and has broken so many of these boundaries". Sheline often contradicted the government's public statements, noting "that I don't expect we'll actually see a real shift." She said she could not serve a government that "enables such atrocities".

=== Tariq Habash ===
Tariq Habash, a political appointee to the Department of Education, resigned on January 4, 2024, in protest of Biden's handling of the Gaza war, while saying that U.S. government "does not value all human life equally". The resignation was after he and others did "everything imaginable" to work the system to register their protests with government leaders. "I cannot stay silent as this administration turns a blind eye to the atrocities committed against innocent Palestinian lives, in what leading human rights experts have called a genocidal campaign by the Israeli government." He is at least the second official and the first known person of Palestinian descent to resign in protest over the U.S. response to the war.

=== Josh Paul ===
Josh Paul, a senior State Department official specializing in arms transfers, resigned in October after stating the U.S. government continues to sell weapons to Israel despite its record of human rights abuses. As the director of the State Department's Office of Military-Political Affairs, he described Washington's support for Israel's war as "blind support". He described Biden's policy a being in favor of "the status quo of the occupation" and as a "shortsighted, destructive, unjust" policy that "will only lead to more and deeper suffering for both the Israeli and the Palestinian people — and is not in the long-term American interest."

=== Andrew Miller ===
According to the Washington Post, Andrew Miller, the assistant secretary of state for Israeli-Palestinian affairs, was a critic of Biden's "bear hug" approach to Israel during Gaza war. He resigned in June 2024.

=== Mike Casey ===
Mike Casey, a former State Department official, resigned in July 2024 over what he described as the U.S. government's unwavering support for Israel despite its devastating military operation in Gaza. Casey said the U.S. government pursues Israel's interests more than its own, and in an interview with Al Jazeera, he stated, "We ignore Palestinian suffering. We accept the Israeli government narrative of events even if we know it's not true, and we really pursue Israel's interests. We don't pursue our own interests."

== See also ==
- Self-immolation of Aaron Bushnell, a US Air Force airman
- United States support for Israel in the Gaza war
- Gaza genocide
- Gaza war
