= A New Policy =

American political action committee

- Formation: April 23, 2024; 2 years ago
- Founder: Josh Paul; Tariq Habash
- Type: Hybrid PAC
- Registration no.: C00876904
- Headquarters: Washington, D.C.
- Region served: United States
- Website: anewpolicy.org

A New Policy is an American political action committee (PAC) and lobbying organization aimed at "reshaping U.S. policy toward Israel and Palestine", founded in 2024 by former US Department of State staff member Josh Paul and former US Department of Education staff member Tariq Habash. Both Paul and Habash resigned from the Biden Administration in opposition to the administration's policies towards Israel and Palestine amidst the Gaza War.

== Background ==
Josh Paul is the former director of congressional and public affairs at the US Bureau of Political-Military Affairs, and resigned in protest from the US State Department in 2023 over military aid to Israel. Tariq Habash was a senior adviser at the US Education Department, and resigned in January 2024 over the Biden Administration's policies.

== Policy positions ==
Paul outlined A New Policy's four key positions: "to preserve a debate about U.S. policy toward Israel; to support Palestinian self-determination; to end U.S. support for Israeli settlements in the West Bank; and to use U.S. leverage 'for a just and lasting peace.'"

A New Policy expressed support for two congressional bills aimed at conditioning US military aid to Israel, the Ceasefire Compliance Act and the Block the Bombs Act.

In May 2026, A New Policy outlined criticism of Section 224 of the 2027 National Defense Authorization Act (NDAA), which proposed to establish the United States-Israel Defense Technology Cooperation Initiative. In a video statement published on May 29, 2026, Paul said that "A new section of law in the National Defense Authorization Act (NDAA) would give Israel unprecedented access to American technology and would force the United States military to integrate Israeli defence technologies into our own critical military supply chain, giving Israel incredible leverage over America’s own defence priorities."
