= United States-Israel Defense Partnership Act of 2025 =

United States Congress
- Long title: To enhance bilateral defense cooperation between the United States and Israel, and for other purposes.
- Considered by: United States Congress
- Introduced by: Joe Wilson (R–SC)
- Introduced: February 12, 2025
- Status: Not passed

The United States-Israel Defense Partnership Act of 2025 is a proposed 2025 Act of Congress introduced by representative Joe Wilson to "increase defense-related cooperation between the United States and Israel."

== Provisions ==
The Act authorizes "$150 million annually from 2026 through 2030 for a new joint U.S.-Israel Counter-Unmanned Systems Program, covering joint research, development, testing, and deployment of advanced counter-drone technologies."

The Act was inserted into H.R. 3838 (Streamlining Procurement for Effective Execution and Delivery and National Defense Authorization Act for Fiscal Year 2026).

== Reaction ==
=== Support ===
On February 1, 2025, AIPAC published a bill summary in support of the Act, writing that the Act "expands and deepens the bilateral defense partnership, leveraging the unique capabilities offered by each country’s defense industrial base to enhance mutual security.

FDD Action, the lobbying organization of Foundation for Defense of Democracies (FDD) spent $150,000 lobbying the US government in the first quarter of 2025, including for the United States-Israel Defense Partnership Act.

=== Opposition ===
On November 12, 2025, A New Policy published a bill summary criticizing the Act, noting that "Embedding U.S. defense cooperation in such systems could implicate U.S. officials and contractors in future war-crimes investigations or violations of international law."
