= Lawrence Franklin espionage scandal =

Theft of classified US intelligence

In 2004, an espionage scandal broke out in the United States involving Lawrence Franklin, a former Department of Defense employee, passing classified documents regarding United States policy towards Iran to Israel. Franklin pleaded guilty to several espionage-related charges and was sentenced in January 2006 to nearly 13 years of prison, which was later reduced to ten months' house arrest. Franklin passed information to the AIPAC policy director Steve J. Rosen and AIPAC senior Iran analyst Keith Weissman, who were fired by AIPAC. They were then indicted for illegally conspiring to gather and disclose classified national security information to Israel. However, prosecutors later dropped all charges against them without any plea bargain.

On June 11, prosecutors asked Judge T. S. Ellis III to reduce Franklin's sentence to eight years for his cooperation. Judge Ellis said the dropping of the case against Rosen and Weissman was a "significant" factor in the sentencing of Franklin and sentenced him to ten months' house arrest along with 100 hours of community service. Ellis said Franklin's community service should consist of "speaking to young people about the importance of public officials obeying the law".

== Background ==
On August 27, 2004, CBS News first reported about a Federal Bureau of Investigation (FBI) investigation into a possible spy in the U.S. Department of Defense working for Israel. The story said that the FBI had uncovered a spy working as a policy analyst under Under Secretary of Defense for Policy Douglas Feith and then-deputy secretary of defense Paul Wolfowitz. He was later identified as Lawrence Franklin, who had previously served as an attaché at the U.S. embassy in Israel and was one of two mid-level Pentagon officials in the Office of the Secretary of Defense responsible for Iran policy in the office's Northern Gulf directorate.

Franklin has pleaded guilty to providing information about a classified presidential directive, and other sensitive information pertaining to U.S. deliberations on foreign policy regarding Iran to AIPAC, who in turn provided the information to Israel. FBI sources have indicated that the year-long investigation was actively underway when the CBS News story broke. Franklin never passed any documents to AIPAC, only information shared verbally.

According to The New York Times, Lawrence Franklin was one of two U.S. officials who held meetings with Iranian dissidents, including Paris-based arms dealer Manucher Ghorbanifar, a key figure in the Iran–Contra affair. These Pentagon-approved meetings were brokered by neoconservative Michael Ledeen of the American Enterprise Institute, who had also played a part in Iran-Contra, and is said to have taken place in Paris in June 2003.

Franklin had previously been assigned to a unit tasked with the Pentagon's Iraq policy, raising concern that he might have been used to influence the war on Iraq, although Pentagon officials have maintained that he was in no position to influence policy. (See also Office of Special Plans.)

On August 30, 2004, Israeli officials admitted that Franklin had met repeatedly with Naor Gilon, head of the political department at the Israeli Embassy in Washington and a specialist on Iran's nuclear programs, but pointed out that this was completely appropriate activity for the two Iran specialists. A Newsweek report indicates that Gilon was under FBI surveillance and that Franklin only became a target after these meetings.

It has been suggested that Franklin's motivations may have been ideological or personal, rather than financial. An unnamed U.S. intelligence official told Newsweek, "For whatever reason, the guy hates Iran [the Iranian government] passionately."

Franklin's security clearance was revoked, although he was not fired, merely demoted. The FBI investigation continued until May 5 when he was arrested and charged with giving away top-secret information.

The indictment revealed that the investigation had been going on since 1999, and suggested that other individuals at AIPAC, the Defense Department, and the Israeli embassy had been involved as well. The indictment also alleged that Kenneth Pollack, a National Security Council staffer during the Clinton administration (and director of research at the Brookings Institution's Saban Center for Middle East Policy) provided information to former AIPAC employees Steve J. Rosen and Keith Weissman. This allegation was not part of any of the legal proceeding in this case. Pollack and a senior State Department official, David Satterfield, were termed "unindicted co-conspirators."

== Criminal charges ==
On May 3, 2005, the FBI filed criminal charges against Franklin. The complaint alleges that, at a June 26, 2003 lunch, Franklin disclosed classified national defense information related to potential attacks on U.S. forces in Iraq to two unnamed individuals. According to contemporary media reports, the two individuals were Steve J. Rosen and Keith Weissman, who were employed by AIPAC at the time. The complaint also alleged that Franklin disclosed classified information to "a foreign official and members of the media", and that a search of Franklin's home found approximately 83 classified documents.

Franklin appeared in court on May 4, 2005. He was released on a $100,000 bond. Franklin's lawyer said he would plead not guilty.

On August 4, a federal grand jury indicted Franklin on five charges of violating the Espionage Act of 1917 :

- One count of conspiracy to communicate national defense information to people not entitled to receive it. (18 USC 793 (d), (e) and (g))
- Three counts of communicating national defense information to people not entitled to receive it. (18 USC 793)
- One count of conspiring to communicate national defense information to an agent of a foreign government. (50 US 783, 18 USC 371)

After being confronted by the FBI in the spring of 2004, Franklin agreed to cooperate and to pass on fabricated information to selected information. He contacted several individuals, including Weissman, with whom he had not seen in over a year. In July 2004, in the Patisserie of the Pentagon City mall's Nordstroms, Franklin repeated the fabricated information orally to Weissman. Because one item concerned imminent assassination plots against Kurds, Iraqis, and Israelis, Weissman felt obligated to pass that information on to the governments whose citizens he told Weissman were targeted.

According to The Washington Post, "A lawyer familiar with the AIPAC case said administration officials 'want[ed] this case as a precedent so they can have it in their arsenal' and added, 'This is a weapon that can be turned against the media.'"

== Guilty plea ==
On September 30, 2005, The Washington Post reported that Franklin was negotiating an agreement with prosecutors and would plead guilty to at least the conspiracy charges at a court hearing the following week, after which he would continue his cooperation with prosecutors.

He did indeed plead guilty to the three conspiracy counts on October 5, explaining that he had shared his frustrations over U.S. Iran policy with the other two defendants regularly in 2002 and later passed oral information to them he knew was classified in the hope they could get them to employees of the National Security Council who might be able to help force a harder line. He also asked Rosen for help getting him a job at the NSC; Rosen told him politely, "I'll see what I can do," claimed Franklin. Rosen never acted upon this request because Franklin eventually was charged with conspiracy counts.

Franklin stated that he knew some of the documents and oral information he passed along could be used to the detriment of U.S. national security interests. However, he never passed nor even showed any documents to Weissman or Rosen.

On January 20, 2006, Judge T.S. Ellis, III sentenced Franklin to 12 years and 7 months in prison and a $10,000 fine for passing classified information to a pro-Israel lobby group and an Israeli diplomat, but Franklin was to remain free pending his cooperation with prosecutors in the cases against Rosen and Weissman.

In August, he denied Weissman and Rosen's motion to dismiss their indictment on the grounds that the government could still prosecute and punish those who retransmitted classified information orally regardless of whether they had a security clearance or not, an interpretation of the Espionage Act that could have wide-reaching implications if it were allowed to become legal precedent.

A significant problem for the government arose in a pre-trial ruling in August 2006, when veteran trial judge T.S. Ellis III ruled that line to mean that prosecutors had to show that U.S. interests were harmed, not just that Rosen and Weissman relayed secrets to a foreign power: Israel. Relaying secrets to friends of the United States, Ellis ruled, was not in and of itself criminal. For a crime to be committed, he wrote in his opinion, the accused must have sought both benefit to another nation as well as to harm the United States. Ellis' legal rulings set a high bar for the prosecutors, including a requirement to prove that Rosen and Weissman knowingly meant to harm the United States or aid another country.

On June 11, prosecutors asked Judge Ellis to reduce Franklin's sentence to eight years for his cooperation. Judge Ellis said the dropping of the case against Rosen and Weissman was a "significant" factor in the sentencing of Franklin and sentenced him to ten months of house arrest along with 100 hours of community service. Ellis said Franklin's community service should consist of "speaking to young people about the importance of public officials obeying the law".

== Franklin's account of events ==
In late 2009, Franklin wrote that his objective was "to halt the rush to war in Iraq—at least long enough to adopt a realistic policy toward an Iran bent on doing us ill", not "to leak secrets to a foreign government". However, the meetings with AIPAC officials in which the pertinent oral information was transmitted, which brought Franklin to the FBI's attention, occurred over three months after the 2003 invasion of Iraq. Franklin confirmed that he never passed any documents to Weissman and Rosen, only oral information.

== Accusations denied by AIPAC and Israel ==
The spying charges have been denied by Israel as well as AIPAC. The Israeli Embassy in Washington called the charges "completely false and outrageous" and AIPAC stated the allegations were "baseless and false."

On December 1, 2004, FBI agents raided the offices of AIPAC and seized computer equipment and files of Howard Kohr, the Executive Director, Richard Fishman, Managing Director, Renee Rothstein, Communication Director and Raphael Danziger. Research Director.

There has been at least one case of Israeli espionage in the United States before the AIPAC scandal. Jonathan Pollard, an Israeli spy who worked in the Naval Antiterrorist Alert Center, pleaded guilty to espionage and was sentenced to life in prison in 1987. The incident had a significantly detrimental impact on U.S.–Israeli relations. Israeli officials have stated that the Israeli government terminated all espionage activities in the United States after the Pollard affair.

Some believe that Israel's credibility with regard to Franklin is tainted by their insistence in the Pollard case that he likewise was not a spy, a position they maintained for 13 years before admitting, in 1998, that Pollard had indeed been a spy for Israel.

== Pentagon statement: Franklin did not influence policy ==
According to a Pentagon statement, "the investigation involves a single individual at D.O.D. at the desk officer level, who was not in a position to have significant influence over U.S. policy."

== Context for the investigation ==
=== Concern about uncontrolled military technology transfers ===
Journalist Jim Lobe suggests that the Franklin story is part of a larger investigation into the transfer of sensitive military and dual-use technologies to Israel, including powerful case-management software. A concern is that Israeli companies have then re-sold sensitive U.S.-derived technology to potential U.S. strategic rivals such as Russia and China and possibly on the black market where it can potentially be obtained by terrorist groups such as al-Qaeda.

=== Media reaction ===
The Los Angeles Times felt that the government was right to drop its espionage case against Rosen and Weissman, arguing that this was the first time that non-government employees were being prosecuted under the Espionage Act, which they argued was meant to prevent government employees from leaking classified information. The Times argued that prosecuting private civilians would set a precedent for prosecuting journalists and others who publish leaked information, which "sounds more like Britain's Official Secrets Act than an American law consonant with the 1st Amendment", pointing out that "when Congress passed the Espionage Act, it explicitly rejected a version that would have punished newspapers for printing information "useful to the enemy"."

=== Rosen interview ===
In a television interview broadcast in Israel, Rosen said, "What it would have shown is that I did nothing wrong," he said. "Who did something wrong is the people who brought this case, not just that they were incorrect, but that the attitude they had about Jews, Israel, and AIPAC was completely false, and unfortunately, a lot of that nonsense is still out there.

"They knew very well that I spoke to the Embassy of Israel; it was no great surprise to them; they also spoke to the embassy," he said. "We would have a triangle, three-way conversation. It was nothing special. It was normal. But these people were talking as if we were a nest of spies, that we were doing something against America."

In the interview at his home, Rosen charged that Lawrence Franklin was railroaded into pleading guilty, by threats to harm his family by cutting off his pension. He said federal prosecutors used the same type of tactics against him.

"They wanted to destroy me. They forced AIPAC to fire me. They forced AIPAC to cut off my attorneys' fees," he said. "They tried to isolate me, to put me in a situation of desperation where I would have to plead guilty to something I did not do. This happens all the time."

== See also ==
- Israeli espionage in the United States
- Jonathan Pollard
