= Ceasefire Compliance Act =

Proposed United States law

United States Congress
- Long title: Ceasefire Compliance Act of 2026
- Territorial extent: United States
- Introduced: February 23, 2026
- Status: Not passed

H.R. 7645, commonly known as the Ceasefire Compliance Act is a proposed Act of Congress introduced by Representative Sean Casten in 2026 to restrict the deployment of American-origin weaponry by Israel in Gaza and the West Bank.

== Provisions ==
The Act creates conditions banning "the use of US-origin weapons in Gaza and the West Bank if Israel violates the October 10, 2025, ceasefire agreement and 20-point plan, annexes the West Bank, or fails to combat settler violence against Palestinians."

The Act exempts defensive weapons systems, including Iron Dome, David’s Sling and Arrow 3.

== Legislative history ==
The bill was introduced on February 23, 2026 with 25 Democratic co-sponsors.

== Reaction ==
In February 2026, J Street issued a statement in support of the Act, writing, "American weapons cannot be used by the Israeli government in Gaza and the West Bank in ways that fundamentally violate American values and directly contravene US interests." Ilan Goldenberg, chief policy officer and senior vice president of J Street, helped to craft the bill's language.

In the Pittsburgh Jewish Chronicle, Karen Gal-Or wrote the Ceasefire Compliance Act and Block the Bombs Act created a "A double standard that endangers the region".
