= Zalman Shapiro =

American chemist and inventor

Zalman Mordecai Shapiro (May 12, 1920 – July 16, 2016) was an American chemist and inventor. He received 15 patents, including a 2009 patent on a process to make commercial production of diamonds cheaper, and played a key role in the development of the reactor that powered the world's first nuclear powered submarine, the Nautilus.

== Biography ==
Shapiro was born in Canton, Ohio, on May 12, 1920 to Abraham and Minnie (née Pinck) Shapiro. He graduated from Passaic High School in New Jersey as the valedictorian in 1938. He attended Johns Hopkins University, earning B.A., M.A., and Ph.D. degrees in 1942, 1945, and 1948, respectively.

== Career ==
After completing his education, Shapiro moved to Pittsburgh, Pennsylvania, and began a career in engineering and chemistry. He worked for Westinghouse Electric and the Bettis Atomic Power Laboratory, where he worked on developing the fuel for the first commercial nuclear power plant, the Shippingport Atomic Power Station. He founded Nuclear Materials and Equipment Corp. (NUMEC) in Apollo, Pennsylvania in 1957 to develop improved methods of processing nuclear fuel. He was then investigated as part of the Apollo affair.

In 2009, at age 89, Shapiro filed a patent for a new process of synthesizing diamonds. His family nominated him for the National Medal of Technology and Innovation, where he received "dozens of recommendation letters", but was not recognized. Pennsylvania Senator Arlen Specter lobbied the Nuclear Regulatory Commission (NRC) on Shapiro's behalf. The NRC responded to the senator by letter in November of that year, stating that the organization was unable to "unequivocally conclude that nuclear material was not diverted from [NUMEC] nor that all previously unaccounted for material was accounted for during the decommissioning of the site."

== Personal life ==
Shapiro married Evelyn Greenberg in 1945, and they have three children: Joshua, Ezra, and Deborah. He was formerly the president of the Pittsburgh chapter of the Zionist Organization of America. Shapiro and his wife were honored in 2008 for their contributions to the Jewish community for over 60 years. He lived in the Oakland section of Pittsburgh, where he died at the age of 96.
