= Michael DiMino =

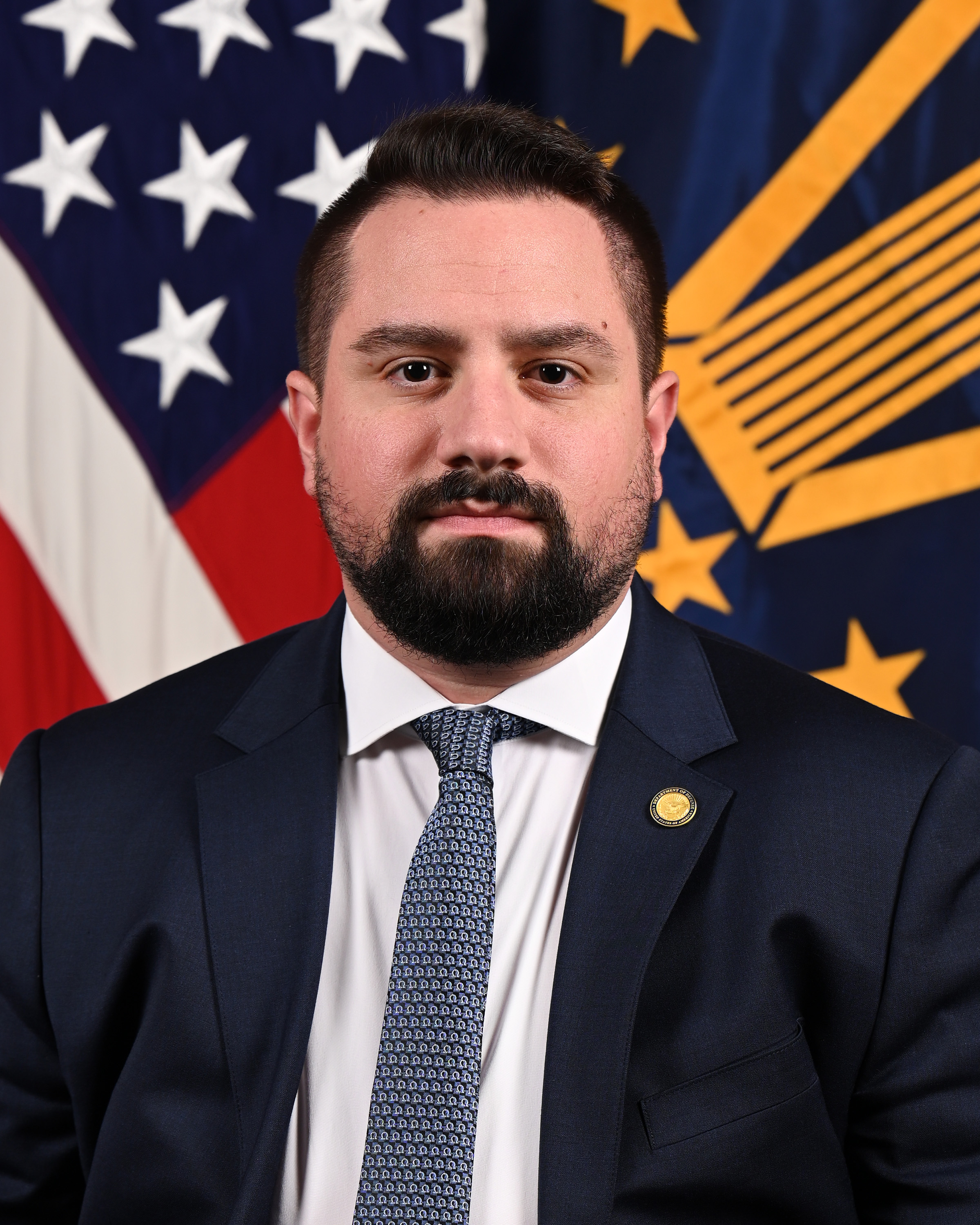

Deputy Assistant Secretary of Defense for the Middle East
- Incumbent
- Assumed office January 20, 2025
- President: Donald Trump
- Preceded by: Daniel B. Shapiro

Personal details
- Party: Republican
- Education: American University (BA); Johns Hopkins University (MA)

Michael P. DiMino IV is an American national security professional, political advisor, international relations scholar, and former intelligence officer, currently serving as deputy assistant secretary of defense for the Middle East since 2025.

== Career ==
DiMino previously served as an analyst and counterterrorism officer in the CIA, and subsequently as a fellow at the think tank Defense Priorities. He identifies as a realist.

During the Biden Administration, DiMino urged the administration to "pressure" Israel and Egypt to deliver more aid to the Gaza Strip. During a webinar in February 2024, DiMino said that while the United States should continue counterterrorism and non-proliferation efforts, there were no “existential U.S. interests in the region," referring to the Middle East.

In a November 2024 interview with Bloomberg News, DiMino summarized the approach the second Trump Administration should take towards the Middle East as, "let's end the war [in Gaza], let's build on the Abraham Accords, and let's dial up some of the plays that worked on Iran in the past Trump administration."

=== Second Trump Administration ===
During the Trump Administration, DiMino oversees Department of Defense policy for the Middle East.

==== Israeli espionage campaign ====
In June 2026, The New York Times reported DiMino was among a group of senior US officials who had been the subject of an Israeli espionage campaign.
