= Apollo affair =

1965 investigation into loss of nuclear materials

The Apollo affair or NUMEC affair was a 1965 incident in which a US company, NUMEC, in the Pittsburgh suburbs of Apollo and Parks Township, Pennsylvania, was investigated for losing 200–600 pounds (91–272 kg) of highly enriched uranium, with suspicions that it had gone to Israel's nuclear weapons program.

== History ==
From 1965 to 1980, the Federal Bureau of Investigation (FBI) investigated Zalman Shapiro, the president of Nuclear Materials and Equipment Corporation (NUMEC), over the loss of 206 pounds (93 kg) of highly enriched uranium. Shapiro was a long-time Zionist, and he had business interests and contacts among high government officials in Israel, including a contract to build nuclear-powered generators for Israel. The Atomic Energy Commission, the Central Intelligence Agency (CIA), other government agencies, and inquiring reporters conducted similar investigations, and no charges were ever filed. A General Accounting Office study of the investigations declassified in May 2010 stated "We believe a timely, concerted effort on the part of these three agencies would have greatly aided and possibly solved the NUMEC diversion questions, if they desired to do so."

In February 1976 the CIA briefed senior staff at the Nuclear Regulatory Commission (NRC) about the matter, stating that the CIA believed the missing highly enriched uranium went to Israel. The NRC informed the White House, leading to President-elect Carter being briefed about the investigation. Carter asked for an assessment by his National Security Advisor, whose staff concluded "The CIA case is persuasive, though not conclusive."

Some remain convinced that Israel received 206 pounds (93 kg) or more of highly enriched uranium from NUMEC, particularly given the visit of Rafi Eitan, later revealed as an Israeli spy and who was later involved in the Jonathan Pollard incident. In June 1986, analyst Anthony Cordesman told United Press International:

"There is no conceivable reason for Eitan to have gone [to the Apollo plant] but for the nuclear material."

In his 1991 book, The Samson Option, Seymour Hersh concluded that Shapiro did not divert any uranium; rather "it ended up in the air and water of the city of Apollo as well as in the ducts, tubes, and floors of the NUMEC plant." He also wrote that Shapiro's meetings with senior Israeli officials in his home were related to protecting the water supply in Israel rather than any diversion of nuclear material or information.

A later investigation was conducted by the Nuclear Regulatory Commission (successor to the AEC) regarding an additional 198 pounds (90 kg) of uranium found to be missing between 1974 and 1976, after the plant had been purchased by Babcock & Wilcox and Shapiro was no longer associated with the company. That investigation found that more than 110 pounds (50 kg) of it could be accounted for by what was called "previously unidentified and undocumented loss mechanisms", including "contamination of workers' clothes, losses from scrubber systems, material embedded in the flooring, and residual deposits in the processing equipment." Hersh further quoted one of the main investigators, Carl Duckett, as saying "I know of nothing at all to indicate that Shapiro was guilty."

In 1993, Glenn T. Seaborg, former head of the Atomic Energy Commission wrote a book, The Atomic Energy Commission under Nixon, Adjusting to Troubled Times which devoted a chapter to Shapiro and NUMEC, the last sentence of which states:

Distinguished as Shapiro's career has been, one cannot but wonder whether it might not have been even more illustrious had these unjust charges not been leveled against him.

Later U.S. Department of Energy records show that NUMEC had the largest highly enriched uranium inventory loss of all U.S. commercial sites, with a 269 kilograms (593 lb) inventory loss before 1968, and 76 kilograms (168 lb) thereafter.

At the prompting of Zalman Shapiro's lawyer, Senator Arlen Specter asked the Nuclear Regulatory Commission (NRC) to clear him of any suspicion of diversion in August 2009. The NRC refused, stating:

NRC found no documents that provided specific evidence that the diversion of nuclear materials occurred. However, consistent with previous Commission statements, NRC does not have information that would allow it to unequivocally conclude that nuclear material was not diverted from the site, nor that all previously unaccounted for material was accounted for during the decommissioning of the site.

In 2014, further documents about the investigation were declassified, though still heavily redacted. These documents contained evidence that Attorney General Edward Levi believed that federal officials in charge of the investigation of NUMEC may have been in violation of federal law by failing to report a felony, and committing accessory after the fact.

The U.S. Army Corps of Engineers is overseeing a cleanup of contaminated land at the site of NUMEC's waste disposal. The project was scheduled to be completed in 2015, but the discovery of a substantially larger amount of contamination resulted in lengthy delays. Remediation is now scheduled to begin in late 2025 or early 2026, with an estimated project time of six years.

== NUMEC and the Apollo affair ==
NUMEC began by doing consulting work for companies in the nuclear field, and it was the first company able to provide fuel that could be used for nuclear reactors. After the company was awarded a contract to process enriched uranium, it was told to inventory its uranium. The inventory came up short, and after a series of efforts to search and recover the material from the factory and its disposal site, the company paid $834,000 to the Atomic Energy Commission (AEC) for the missing uranium.

Shapiro was a long-time Zionist, and he had business interests and contacts among high government officials in Israel, including a contract to build nuclear-powered generators for Israel. He was suspected for many years of diverting some 269 kilograms (591 pounds) of uranium to Israel, enough to make several nuclear weapons. In September 1968, four Israeli intelligence agents visited NUMEC; among them was Rafi Eitan, who was listed as a defense ministry chemist.

The missing uranium was investigated for over 15 years. Both the AEC and the FBI examined the records and the plant; only a small portion of what was thought to be missing was located. Estimates of the missing amount have varied as well, from 200 pounds to almost 600 pounds. However, one report concluded that there was "no substantive evidence to indicate that a diversion occurred". Shapiro denied any wrongdoing, and said that such discrepancies are "not unusual" and that losses could be explained as normal to the complex processing.

In his 1991 book, The Samson Option, Seymour Hersh concluded that Shapiro did not divert any uranium; rather "it ended up in the air and water of the city of Apollo as well as in the ducts, tubes, and floors of the NUMEC plant." He also wrote that Shapiro's meetings with senior Israeli officials in his home were related to protecting the water supply in Israel rather than any diversion of nuclear material or information. A later investigation was conducted by the Nuclear Regulatory Commission (successor to the AEC) regarding an additional 198 pounds of uranium that was found to be missing between 1974 and 1976, after the plant had been purchased by Babcock & Wilcox and Shapiro was no longer associated with the company. That investigation found that more than 110 pounds of it could be accounted for by what was called "previously unidentified and undocumented loss mechanisms", including "contamination of workers' clothes, losses from scrubber systems, material embedded in the flooring, and residual deposits in the processing equipment." Hersh further quoted one of the main investigators, Carl Duckett, as saying "I know of nothing at all to indicate that Shapiro was guilty."

Later U.S. Department of Energy records show that NUMEC had the largest highly enriched uranium inventory loss of all U.S. commercial sites, with a 269 kilograms (593 lb) inventory loss before 1968, and 76 kilograms (168 lb) thereafter.

The US Army Corps of Engineers oversaw a cleanup of contaminated land at the site of NUMEC's waste disposal, which was scheduled to be completed in 2015, but the discovery of a substantially larger amount of contamination resulted in a seven year delay. Excavation is now scheduled to begin in 2021, with an estimated project time of 10 years.

== In popular culture ==
Dominique LaPierre and Larry Collins mentioned this incident as part of a lengthy and detailed backstory to Israel's nuclear arsenal and its fictitious aborted nuclear strike against Libya in The Fifth Horseman. The book states that at least half of the uranium, according to the CIA, made it to Israel.

== See also ==
- Israel and weapons of mass destruction
- Nuclear technology
