= 2016 U.S.-Israel Memorandum of Understanding =

Memorandum of Understanding to Israel from The United States In 2016

2016 United States–Israel Memorandum of Understanding
- Type: Memorandum of understanding (MOU)
- Context: Israel–United States military relations
- Signed: September 14, 2016; 10 years ago
- Effective: October 1, 2018; 8 years ago
- Replaces: 2007 United States–Israel MOU
- Signatories: (United States) Thomas A. Shannon Jr. (Israel) Jacob Nagel
- Parties: United States; Israel
- Archived February 2, 2017, at the Wayback Machine

Signing of the MOU on September 14, 2016

The 2016 U.S.-Israel Memorandum of Understanding is a 10-year security assistance Memorandum of Understanding (MOU) to Israel by the United States, covering the years FY2019-FY2028. The total value of the MOU is $38 billion ($3.8 billion per year), the largest aid package in US history.

== Background ==
The 2016 MOU succeeded the $30 billion 2007 U.S.-Israel Memorandum of Understanding, which expired at the end of FY2018.

The negotiations for the MOU lasted for 10 months. The MOU was signed on September 14, 2016 in a formal ceremony at the US State Department. The MOU was signed by under secretary of state for political affairs Thomas A. Shannon Jr., and Jacob Nagel, the acting national security adviser to Prime Minister Benjamin Netanyahu.

As part of the agreement, the Israeli government signed a letter promising to return any additional money that Congress appropriated in 2017 and 2018. Congress had planned to give Israel an additional $600 million for missile defense as well $3.4 billion in 2017. Senator Lindsey Graham accused the Obama Administration of pressuring the Israeli Government to write the letter, saying "It is a level of antagonism against Israel that I can't understand."

== Provisions ==
The 2016 MOU provided $500 million annually for missile defense programs. Supplemental appropriations were made in 2022 ($1 billion) and 2024 ($5.2 billion) to replenish Iron Dome and David Sling interceptors used during the Gaza War.

== See also ==
- Next U.S.-Israel Memorandum of Understanding
