= Block the Bombs Act =

Proposed United States law

United States Congress
- Long title: To provide for a limitation on the transfer of defense articles and defense services to Israel.
- Introduced by: Representative Delia Ramirez
- Introduced: May 21, 2025
- Status: Pending

H.R. 3565, commonly known as the Block the Bombs Act, is a proposed Act of Congress introduced in 2025 to prohibit the President of the United States from "selling, transferring, or exporting certain defense articles or services to Israel, except in specified circumstances."

== Provisions ==
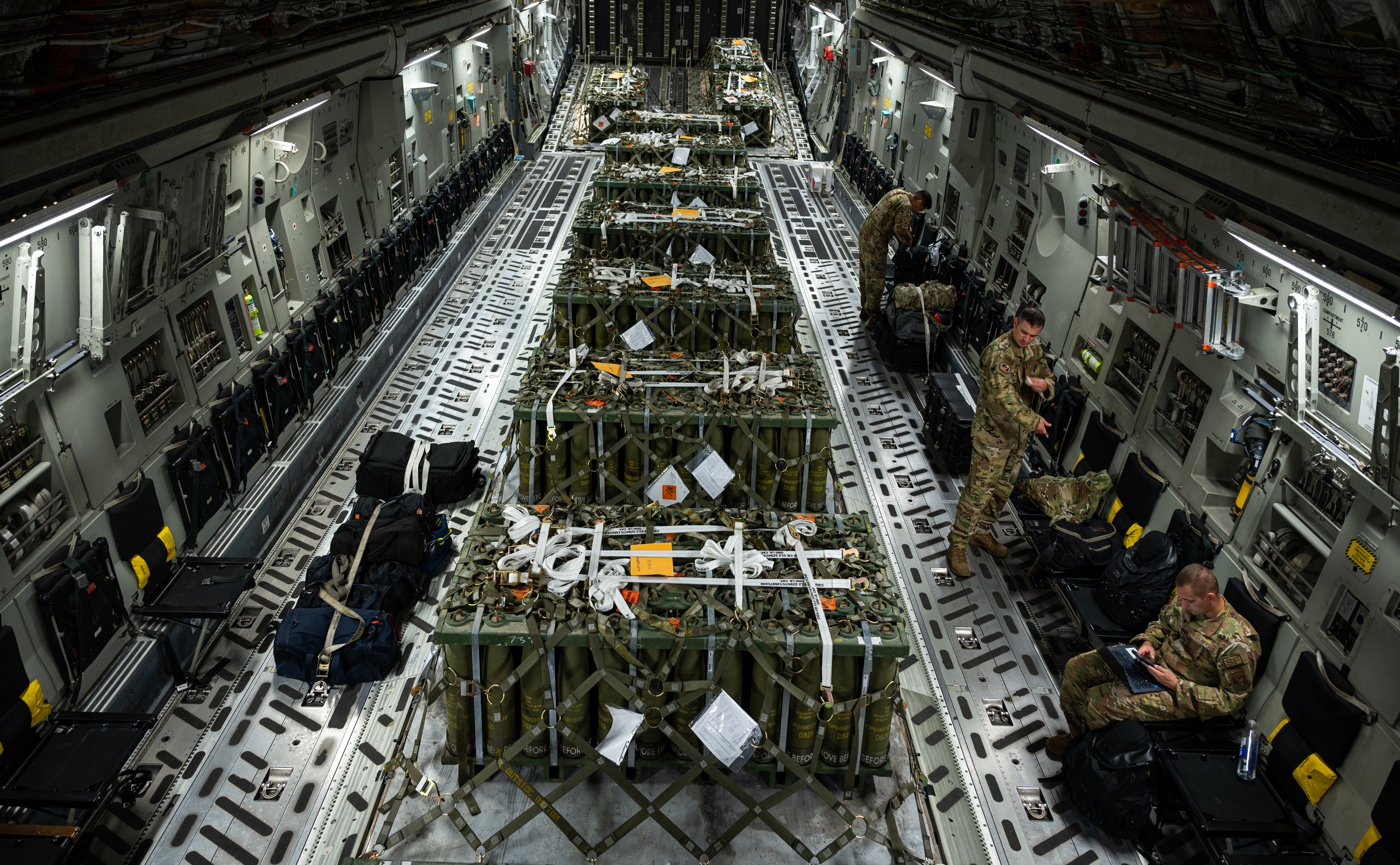
United States Air Force airmen prepare for departure in a C-17 Globemaster III to supply Israel with munitions, Oct. 15, 2023, at Ramstein Air Base, Germany.

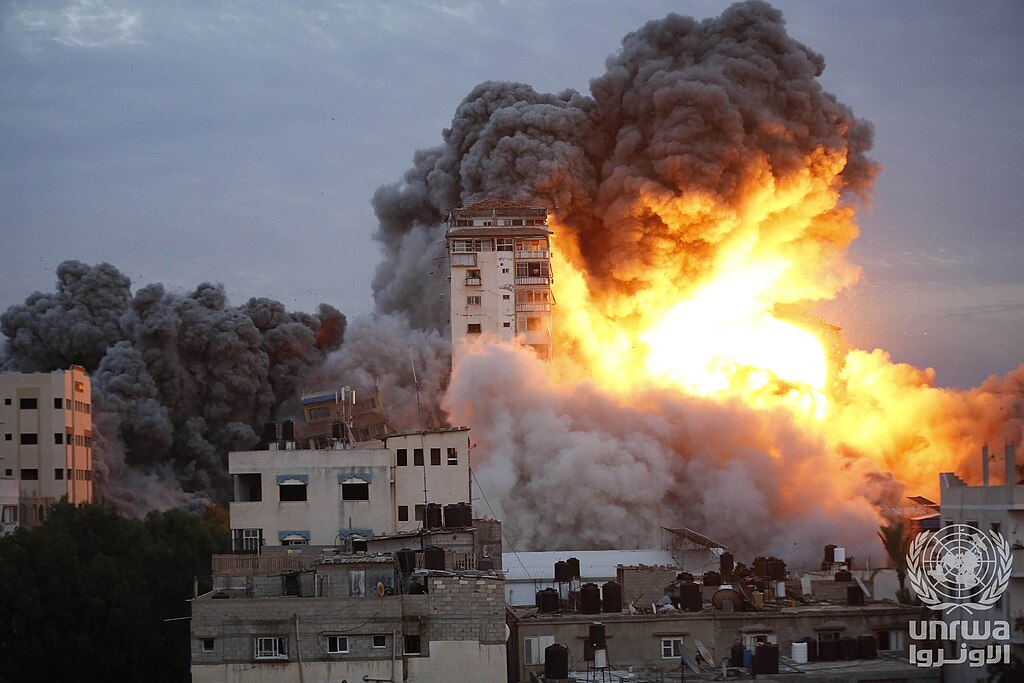
Palestine Tower, residential tower in Gaza, destroyed by Israeli bombardment on the morning of 8 October 2023.

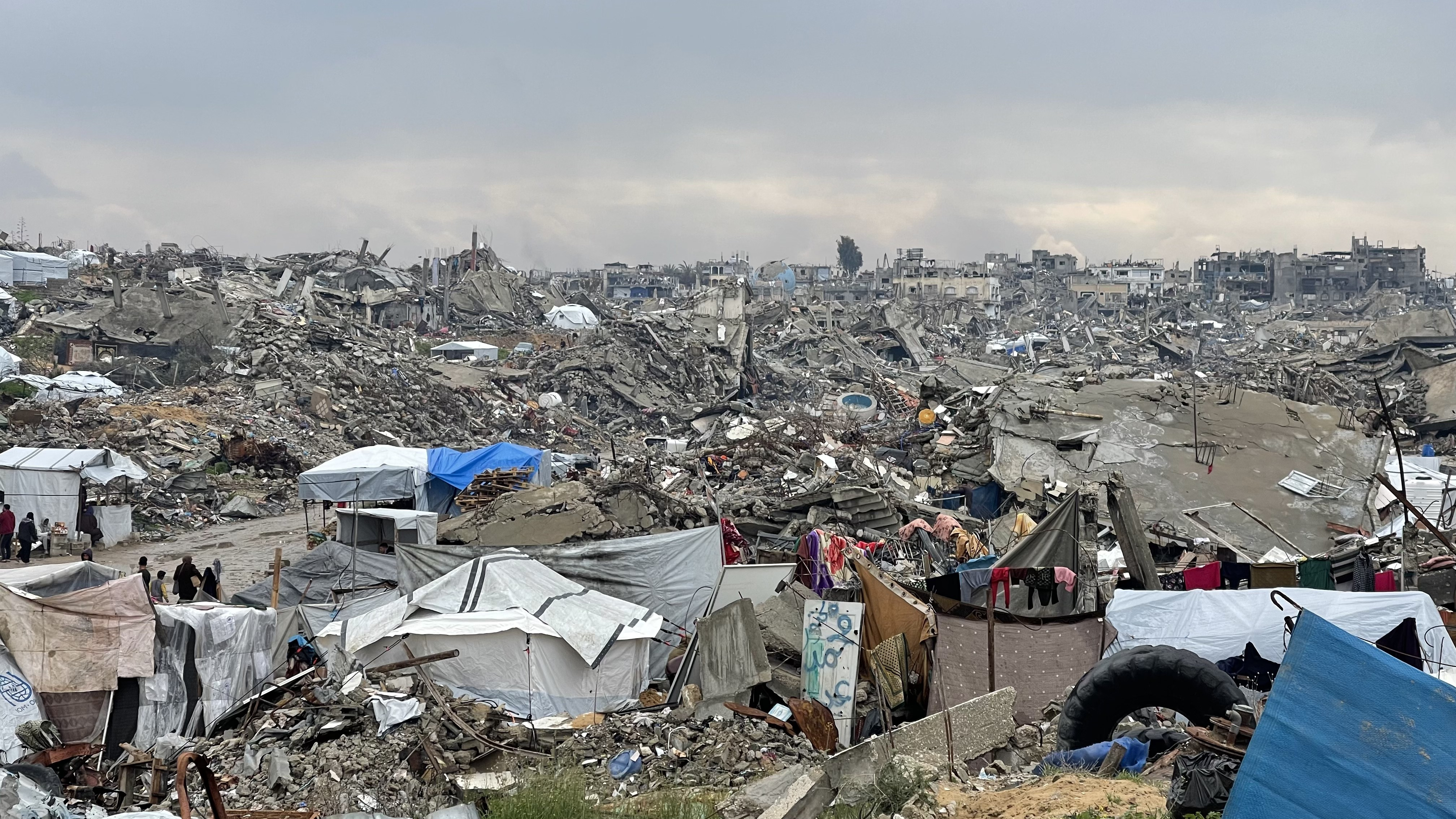
Ruins of Beit Lahia in the Gaza Strip, destroyed by Israeli bombardments, February 23, 2025.

The law requires arms sales to Israel be in "accordance with international humanitarian law, international human rights law, and relevant bilateral agreements".

== Legislative history ==
The Block the Bombs Act was introduced on May 21, 2025 by Rep. Delia Ramirez of Illinois with 21 original co-sponsors. As of March 2026, the bill has 63 Democratic co-sponsors.

In February 2026, 26 Democratic representatives led by Sean Casten co-sponsored the Ceasefire Compliance Act, to bar US-origin weapons from being used in the West Bank and Gaza unless Israel meets defined conditions for compliance. Casten noted the Act was "additive" to the Block the Bombs Act.

As of June 4, 2026, the bill has 73 co-sponsors, including Republican representative Thomas Massie.

== Reaction ==
=== Non-governmental organizations ===
In June 2025, the Center for Constitutional Rights issued a statement in support of the Act, writing "The Block the Bombs Act is a historic bill that prohibits the transfer and sale of specific U.S. weapons to Israel that the Israeli government has consistently used to commit atrocities against Palestinian civilians in violation of both international and U.S. law."

The American Jewish Congress criticized the Act, writing that "Such legislation poses a serious risk to Israel’s security at a time when the country is fighting on multiple fronts—working to bring hostages home and protect its citizens from ongoing threats."

In February 2026, Amnesty International released a statement in support of the Act, recommending "All Representatives urgently co-sponsor H.R. 3565".

Margaret DeReus, the executive director at the Institute for Middle East Understanding (IMEU), said that "We are coming from such a deficit, where Congress has been so lacking in the courage to do what’s right, that this is actually a huge improvement from where we were," adding it was important to "mark the progress" of the bill.

=== 2026 elections ===
In February 2026, Brad Lander, Democratic candidate for New York's 10th congressional district, authored an op-ed in The Nation titled "To Build Bridges, We Must Block the Bombs", advocating for the Act.

Following the June 2026 Democratic primary victories of two Democratic Socialists of America candidates, Mayor of New York City Zohran Mamdani spoke in support of the Act.
