= United States-Israel Business Alliance =

- Formation: 2019
- Headquarters: New York City
- Key people: Aaron Kaplowitz (president)

The United States-Israel Business Alliance (USIBA) is an organization established to foster business relationships between the United States and Israel.

== Activities ==
The organization publishes reports outlining the economic impact of Israeli businesses and investment in the United States, including in Florida, New York, California, and Virginia. In 2026, it published a report based on 2024 data showing that in California, Israeli-founded companies employed 14,452 people and generated $8.9 billion in economic output, or 0.16% of California's GDP.

The alliance also supports educational programming in support of US-Israel entrepreneurship. Florida International University began offering a course titled "Innovation Nation: The Global Influence of Israeli Technology and Entrepreneurship" to students in its Honors College. The course was co-taught by USIBA president Aaron Kaplowitz.
