= Lily Greenberg Call =

American activist

- Born: San Diego
- Alma mater: San Diego Jewish Academy; University of California, Berkeley
- Employer: United States Department of the Interior (2023–2024)

Lily Nikole Greenberg Call is an American political activist and former public servant with a background in political science, humanitarian work, and Israel advocacy. She has been involved in various political campaigns, humanitarian efforts, and advocacy initiatives both in the United States and abroad. She resigned from her post at the US Department of the Interior, becoming the first Jewish political appointee to do so in protest of the 2023 Israel-Hamas war.

== Early life and education ==
Greenberg Call was born and raised in San Diego, California. In 2010, she co-founded "Girls Give Back", a leadership group for teenage girls through San Diego's Jewish Family Services, by which she developed an advocacy program to train girls on community impact and legislative processes. In 2014, she received the Peter Chortek Leadership Award from the Jewish Community Foundation of San Diego for her efforts in advocacy and leadership.

After graduating from the San Diego Jewish Academy, Greenberg Call pursued higher education at the University of California, Berkeley, where she majored in political science and minored in public policy. During her time at UC Berkeley, she was actively involved in student organizations, such as the Cal Berkeley Democrats. She held leadership roles in the Jewish Student Union and Bears for Israel, and served as a student director at the university's Institute of Governmental Studies. In 2015 and 2018, she received the Cal Alumni Association Leadership Award, which recognizes outstanding leadership and community involvement among students at UC Berkeley.

== Activism and career ==
In 2014, Greenberg Call covered events leading up to and during Operation Protective Edge as part of the Jewish United Fund's "Write on For Israel" journalism and advocacy program. Following the experience, she spent a year in Israel on the Young Judaea gap year program, which included educational courses and volunteer work. In April 2015, she organized a conference on gender equity that brought together students from 23 high schools in the San Diego area. The event covered issues like pay equity, human trafficking, and sexual assault on college campuses. Participants also had the opportunity to learn about current legislation and to advocate with local politicians.

In 2016, Greenberg Call worked for Hillary Clinton's presidential campaign. From 2017 to 2019, she served as the president of Bears for Israel, the American Israel Public Affairs Committee (AIPAC) affiliate group at U.C. Berkeley. In 2018, she was involved with the Member Engagement department of the Democratic Congressional Campaign Committee (DCCC) and the Advocacy and Government Relations department of Amnesty International USA. In 2019, she worked for Kamala Harris's presidential campaign. During the 2020 US election cycle, she was a field organizer for the Biden-Harris campaign in Arizona and Iowa.

From 2021 to 2022, Greenberg Call worked as a paralegal for Terris, Pravlik, and Millan LLP, a public interest litigation firm, assisting attorneys in civil rights and environmental cases. In 2022, she publicly cut ties with AIPAC and criticized the organization for what she called its unconditional support for the Israeli government.

In February 2023, the United States Department of the Interior announced Greenberg Call as a political appointee, serving as Special Assistant to the Chief of Staff. Her responsibilities included supporting the Chief of Staff in strategic planning and coordination of departmental initiatives.

=== Resignation from Biden administration ===
On May 15, 2024, Greenberg Call resigned from her position in protest of President Joe Biden's support for Israel in the Gaza war. She was the first Jewish political appointee to do so. Greenberg Call chose to resign on May 15 to highlight Nakba Day, which commemorates the mass displacement of Palestinians in 1948 that preceded the formation of the state of Israel. Her resignation letter criticized the Biden administration's support for Israel's actions in Gaza during the Gaza war, accusing him of exploiting Jewish people to defend U.S. policy. Call further condemned the administration's stance, stating "I can no longer in good conscience continue to represent this administration amidst President Biden's disastrous, continued support for Israel's genocide in Gaza."
