= Josh Paul (U.S. official) =

Human rights activist

- Born: Joshua M. Paul
- Education: University of St Andrews (MA Hons); Georgetown University (MA)

Josh Paul is a human rights activist and former director of congressional and public affairs for the Bureau of Political-Military Affairs, an agency within the United States Department of State. Paul resigned from his position in October 2023 in opposition to the Biden administration's decision to continue arms transfers to Israel amid the Gaza war, making him the first Biden administration official to do so publicly.

== Career ==
Paul served as director of congressional and public affairs for the Bureau of Political-Military Affairs for 11 years, a role involving the approval of major arms transfers and sales. Paul described the bureau as "the US government entity most responsible for the transfer and provision of arms to partners and allies," adding that his position forced him to make "more moral compromises than I can recall." According to Paul, during his tenure, several arms transfers and sales were approved that, in his view, should have been blocked by existing U.S. law. In response to what he viewed as the Biden administration's immoral and shortsighted "blind support" of Israel, Paul resigned from his post on Tuesday, October 17, 2023. Paul explained that, unlike with past controversial arms transfers, he "couldn't shift anything" and was unable to effectively push for a more humane Gaza policy. In his public resignation letter, Paul condemned Hamas's October 7th attack, but stated that American support for Israel's blockade and bombardment of the densely populated Gaza Strip and "the status quo of the occupation will only lead to more and deeper suffering for both the Israeli and the Palestinian people." Paul received the 2023 Joe A. Callaway Award for Civic Courage in recognition of his decision to resign.

In the months following Paul's resignation, several other U.S. officials resigned over the Biden's Gaza policy, including Lily Greenberg Call and Hala Rharrit. In July 2024, Paul was among a group of twelve former U.S. officials who released a joint statement describing the Biden administration's Gaza policy as "a failure and a threat to U.S. national security." In the statement, the former officials argued that "America’s diplomatic cover for, and continuous flow of arms to Israel has ensured our undeniable complicity in the killings and forced starvation of a besieged Palestinian population in Gaza." Paul believes that continued U.S. arms transfers to Israel violate the Leahy Law, a position held by former Senator Patrick Leahy.

Paul currently serves as a Fellow at Democracy for the Arab World Now (DAWN), an organization established by Jamal Khashoggi. In the months following his resignation, he has been vocal in his opposition to the Biden administration's foreign policy. He was interviewed by CNN's Christiane Amanpour in December 2023 and has been invited to speak at several universities, including UCLA, The Ohio State University, and Dartmouth. In May 2024, following Dartmouth's "crackdown" on anti-war campus protests, Paul canceled his scheduled appearance at the university.

=== A New Policy ===
In 2024, Paul and Tariq Habash launched A New Policy, a political action committee and lobbying group dedicated to supporting a U.S. Middle East policy centered around human rights and compliance with U.S. and international law. On the day of the announcement, Paul said that “the policies that the United States has been pursuing, certainly for the last year and frankly before that, have been deeply harmful to the Palestinian people ― but also to American interests ... [and] the stability of the Middle East."

== See also ==
- List of U.S. officials who resigned over Biden's support for Israel in the Gaza war
- United States support for Israel in the Gaza war
- Gaza war protests in the United States
- Gaza genocide
- Lily Greenberg Call
- Daniel Lewis Foote
- Tariq Habash
