= Intelligence Authorization Act for Fiscal Year 2027 =

Proposed U.S. public law

- Long title: To authorize appropriations for fiscal year 2027 for intelligence and intelligence-related activities of the United States Government, the Intelligence Community Management Account, and the Central Intelligence Agency Retirement and Disability System, and for other purposes.

Legislative history
- Introduced in the Senate by Tom Cotton on May 20, 2026; Committee consideration by United States Senate Select Committee on Intelligence

The Intelligence Authorization Act for Fiscal Year 2027 is a proposed U.S. public law that authorizes appropriations for fiscal year 2027 for intelligence activities of the U.S. government. The bill was introduced into the United States Senate by Senator Tom Cotton during the 119th United States Congress.

== Provisions ==
The bill eliminates senate confirmation for members of the US Intelligence Community, including the general counsels for the DNI and CIA, along with the directors of the National Counterterrorism Center and National Counterintelligence and Security Center.

The bill would direct the Artificial Intelligence Security Center of the National Security Agency to provide "a research test-bed to private sector and academic researchers, on a subsidized basis, to engage in artificial intelligence security research." This work would examine foreign adversaries' malicious use of AI.

Amendments introduced by Senator Mark Kelly include a variety of mandates to review the risks of AI.

=== Section 620 ===
The bill's Section 620, titled "Intelligence Activities Related to Ukraine", contains provisions protecting intelligence sharing with Ukraine in the midst of the Russian invasion. The provisions stipulate that intelligence sharing with Ukraine would be suspended if there was "credible intelligence that an element of the government of Ukraine receiving United States intelligence support engaged in a pattern of human rights violations, atrocities, or violations of the law of armed conflict".

=== Section 622 ===
The bill's Section 622, titled "United States-Israel Intelligence Sharing Enhancement", contains provisions introduced by Cotton to amend the National Security Act of 1947, adding Section 1115, titled "Requirements relating to intelligence sharing". The section mandates to "expand and enhance intelligence sharing with the Government of Israel," which "shall not be suspended, reduced, or otherwise materially limited except on the basis of a specific and identifiable national security concern."

Section 622 does not stipulate Israel meet any human rights obligations as a condition of the expanded intelligence relationship.

Section 622 provides for intelligence sharing that,

"shall include the sharing of information relating to cybersecurity threats, terrorism, sanctions evasion, plans and intentions of state and non-state actors, adversarial technology proliferation, missile threats, unmanned aerial systems, cruise missiles, ballistic missiles, air and space domain awareness, and other aerial threats relevant to the defense of Israel, United States forces and interests in the region, and regional security partners".

The provisions include requirements for expanded intelligence sharing among members of the Abraham Accords.

These include a requirement for future presidents to document any determinations to limit, suspend, or reduce security and intelligence cooperation with Israel. These provisions were compared to the Five Eyes Alliance by American libertarian magazine Reason, noting, "No other country in the world has this kind of mandated intelligence sharing under U.S. law."

In The Independent, Sam Kiley wrote that Section 622 "eclipses the English-speaking Five Eyes espionage alliance," adding "This effectively ends the autonomy of the Central Intelligence Agency, the National Security Agency, the Federal Bureau of Investigation and many other US security organisations from Israel."

== Legislative history ==
The bill was introduced on May 20, 2026, by Senator Tom Cotton.

On May 21, 2026, the Senate Select Committee on Intelligence voted 14 to 3 to advance the bill out of committee. Senator Ron Wyden, who voted against the bill, said, "The bill is a dramatic retreat for congressional oversight, at precisely the moment when scrutiny of intelligence community activities is needed most."

== Reaction ==
Military.com noted that "Neither Section 622 nor Section 224 requires Israel to provide reciprocal access to technology, software, source code, or intelligence as a condition of expanded cooperation. It does not require certification that previous disputes involving technology-sharing have been resolved." It added that Section 622 does not address historic disputes over access to Israeli source code for US-owned Iron Dome systems, or address Israeli espionage in the US.

=== Opposition ===
Harrison Mann, a former US Army major and executive officer of the Defense Intelligence Agency's Middle East/Africa Regional Center who resigned in November 2023 over the Biden Administration's support of the Gaza War, said of Cotton's provisions regarding intelligence sharing with Israel, "The goal here is to tie the hands of a future president who tries to de-exceptionalize the U.S.-Israel security relationship, in this case by requiring them to publicly justify any downgrade to U.S.-Israel intel sharing, in the hope that they'd be pressured or embarrassed into reconsidering."

Lara Friedman, president of the Foundation for Middle East Peace, described Section 622 as a "HUGE deal" on social media, writing that the provisions should be publicly debated as opposed to "quietly slipping into law unnoticed".

In an analysis published by Responsible Statecraft on June 10, 2026, Paul R. Pillar characterized Section 622 as a way of moving intelligence sharing to "the shadowy world of relations between intelligence agencies," adding that it would be "farther removed from public visibility and accountability than the defense integration, and even less likely to stimulate thoughts about American taxpayers' money going to a foreign country."

On June 11, 2026, the Council on American-Islamic Relations (CAIR) published an action alert in support of blocking both Section 622 of the Intelligence Authorization Act for Fiscal Year 2027 and Section 224 of the 2027 National Defense Authorization Act, describing them as, "two separate but closely related proposals". In a statement, CAIR Government Affairs Director Robert S. McCaw said, "Congress must act to block these Israel‑first bills that would force a deeper U.S. and Israel military and intelligence merger, a merger that will weaken independent American oversight, compromise U.S. national interests, and pull the country into foreign conflicts without democratic consent."

In Al Jazeera, Said Arikat wrote on July 6, 2026 that if Section 622 and Section 219 of the 2027 National Defense Authorization Act were passed, "foreign policy flexibility would give way to statutory permanence."

== See also ==
- Ukraine–United States military relations
- Israel–United States military relations
- Section 224 of the 2027 National Defense Authorization Act, a provision establishing the "United States-Israel Defense Technology Cooperation Initiative"
