= Prahran railway station =

Railway station in Melbourne, Australia

Prahran
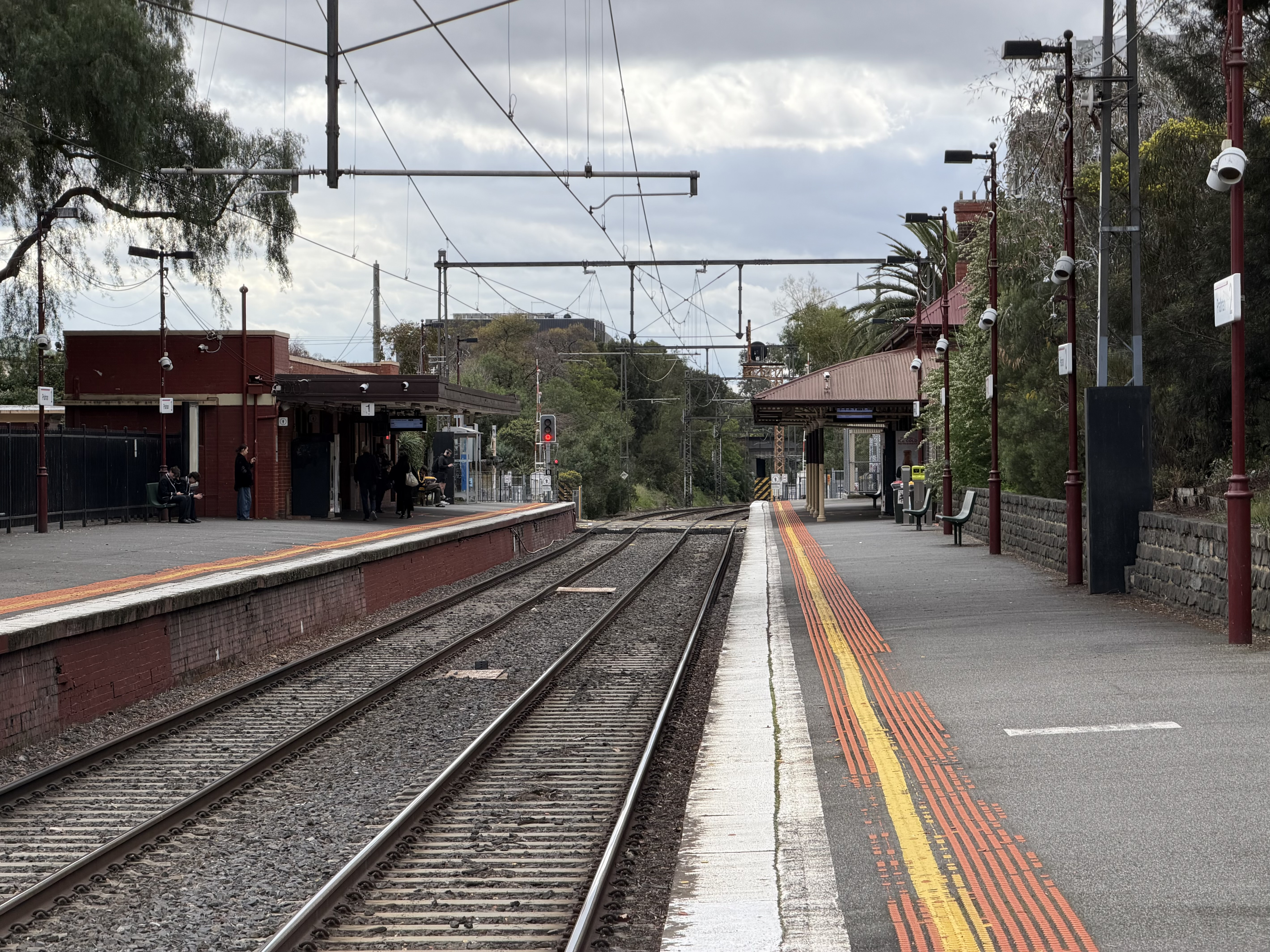
- Northbound view from Platform 2, August 2026

General information
- Location: Greville Street/Porter Street, Prahran, Victoria 3181, City of Stonnington; Australia
- Coordinates: 37°50′58″S 144°59′24″E
- System: commuter rail station
- Owner: VicTrack
- Operator: Metro Trains
- Transit authority: Public Transport Victoria
- Line: Sandringham
- Distance: 6.72 kilometres (4.18 mi) from Southern Cross
- Platforms: 2 side
- Tracks: 2
- Connections: Tram

Construction
- Structure type: Ground
- Parking: No
- Cycle facilities: No
- Accessible: Yes—step free access

Other information
- Status: Operational, host station
- Station code: PRA
- Fare zone: Myki zone 1
- Website: Public Transport Victoria

History
- Opened: 22 December 1860; 165 years ago
- Electrified: 28 May 1919
- Former names: Greville Street (1860–1866)

Passengers
- 2015–2016: 1,341,311
- 2016–2017: 1,376,037 ▲2.58%
- 2017–2018: 1,371,597 ▼0.32%
- 2018–2019: 1,156,066 ▼15.71%

Services
Preceding station	Metro Trains	Following station
South Yarra towards Laverton, Werribee or Williamstown via Flinders Street	Sandringham line	Windsor towards Sandringham
Track layout
Location

Prahran station is a railway station operated by Metro Trains Melbourne on the Sandringham line, part of Melbourne's rail network. It serves the south-eastern suburb of Prahran in Melbourne, Victoria, Australia.

Opened on 22 December 1860, it was initially named Greville Street, then it was given its current name of Prahran on 1 January 1867. Prahran station is a ground level host station, featuring two side platforms. The station is accessible, with step free access to the station provided.

The station connects to services on tram route 6. The journey to Southern Cross railway station is approximately 6.72 kilometres (4.18 mi).

== Description ==
Prahran railway station is located in the suburb of Prahran, a suburb of Melbourne, Victoria. The station is located near the Prahran Square event precinct, the Prahran Market, and the Alfred Hospital. The station is owned by VicTrack, a state government agency, and is operated by Metro Trains Melbourne. The station is approximately 6.72 kilometres (4.18 mi), or a 7-minute train ride, to Southern Cross station. The adjacent stations are South Yarra station up towards Melbourne, and Windsor station down towards Sandringham.

The station consists of two side platforms with a total of two platform edges. A station building is located at Porter Street, which has a boom-style verandah extending around the building. The station complex is included in the City of Stonnington's heritage overlay, numbered HO95. The complex is largely the same as when it was originally built, as only minor works such as repainting have been carried out. Car parking is not available at the station. The station is listed as an "independent access" station on Metro Trains Melbourne's accessibility guide, as step-free access to the station is provided. Prahran station is staffed only during the morning peak.

== History ==
Prahran station opened on 22 December 1860 as Greville Street, when the railway line from Cremorne was extended to Chapel Street station. On 1 January 1867, the station was renamed 'Prahran'. In 1886, a deputation from Prahran's residents was raised to the commissioners of the Victorian Railways, which proposed the removal of Prahran station and the construction of a new station at Commercial Road, which would eliminate the level crossing at Greville Street. However, the removal never took place. Prahran station was served by the Brighton Beach line until 1887, when the line was extended to Sandringham.

Improvements to the station occurred in 1895. Another proposal for the station's removal was put forward in 1905. The Victorian Railways started an omnibus service between Prahran station and Malvern town hall which operated between 1 December 1905 to 17 June 1906. The service shut down due to the unreliability of the buses and rough condition of roads, which made the service unpopular with locals. In 1908, a pedestrian subway at Prahran station was proposed. This was completed in 1915, replacing the overhead footbridge at Greville Street.

Three-position signalling was provided to the Sandringham line between Richmond station and Prahran station on 4 October 1915, which was the first example of automatic signalling in Victoria. On 16 December 1917, three-position signalling was provided between Prahran station and Ripponlea station. The Sandringham line was electrified on 28 May 1919. New brick buildings were provided at the station in 1939 due to its poor condition at the time. In 1962, boom barriers replaced interlocked gates at the Greville Street level crossing, located at the up end of the station. The signal box that protected the level crossing was also abolished during that time. In October 1979, automatic semaphore signals were replaced with light signals between Prahran and Windsor.

Automatic pedestrian gates were provided at the Greville Street level crossing on 24 May 1997, which, in turn, abolished the pedestrian subway. On 4 May 2010, as part of the 2010/2011 State Budget, $83.7 million was allocated to upgrade Prahran to a premium station, along with nineteen others. However, in March 2011, this was scrapped by the Baillieu Government. In 2014, Labor candidate for Prahran, Neil Pharaoh, proposed to open a second entrance to Prahran station on High Street. By September, it had become an election promise in the 2014 Victorian state election. The Liberal Party then matched the pledge in October. (Note: The Greens won the seat of Prahran.) On 24 June 2015, then-Labor Member for the Southern Metropolitan Region, Philip Dalidakis, officially opened the second entrance.

== Platforms and services ==
Prahran station has two side platforms. It is served by Sandringham line trains. The Sandringham line runs between Flinders Street station and Sandringham station.

On weekdays, Sandringham line services run every 7–8 minutes during peak hours. Services also run every 10–12 minutes during interpeak periods and every 20 minutes after 8:30pm. Services run every 20 minutes throughout the day on weekends. On Sundays, a service will run every hour until 8:00am, and every 40 minutes until 10:00am. Since the Sandringham line is part of the Night Network, services also run hourly on Friday and Saturday nights.

Prahran platform arrangement
Platform	Line	Destination	Via	Service Type	Notes	Source
1	Sandringham line	Laverton, Werribee or Williamstown	Flinders Street	All stations	Services to Laverton and Williamstown only operate on weekdays.	
2	Sandringham line	Sandringham		All stations		

== Transport links ==
Prahran station has one tram connection, which is operated by Yarra Trams. Tram route 6 runs from Moreland station to Glen Iris, with Prahran station's connection operating from High Street.

- : Moreland station – Glen Iris
