= Alfred Rose =

Alfred Rose may refer to:

- Alfred Rose (singer) (1932–2003), Goan tiatrist
- Alfred Rose (bishop) (1884–1971), Church of England bishop
- Alfred Rosé (1902–1975), Austrian composer and conductor
- Alfred Rose (cricketer) (1894–1985), English cricketer
- Alfred Lionel Rose (1898–1980), Australian Army officer and veterinarian
- Al Rose (1905–1985), American football tight end

== See also ==
- Albert Rose (disambiguation)
- Al Rosen (disambiguation)
- Elie Rous, French football manager
