= Balaclava railway station, Melbourne =

Railway station in Australia

Balaclava
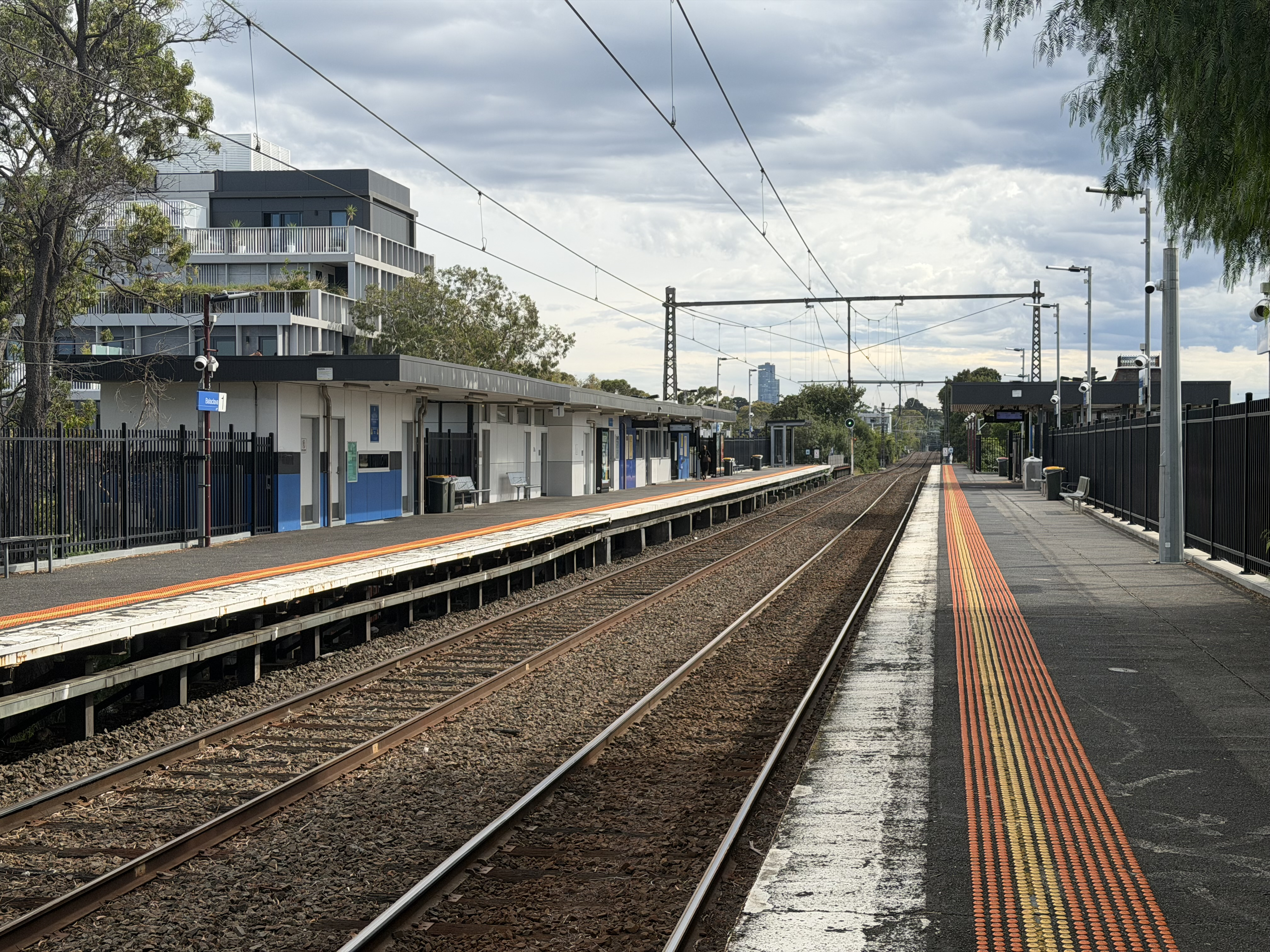
- Northbound view from Platform 2, February 2026

General information
- Location: Carlisle Street, Balaclava, Victoria 3183; City of Port Phillip; Australia
- Coordinates: 37°52′10″S 144°59′36″E
- System: PTV commuter rail station
- Owner: VicTrack
- Operator: Metro Trains
- Line: Sandringham
- Distance: 9.09 kilometres from Southern Cross
- Platforms: 2 side
- Tracks: 2
- Connections: Tram

Construction
- Structure type: Elevated
- Accessible: Yes—step free access

Other information
- Status: Operational, premium station
- Station code: BCV
- Fare zone: Myki zone 1
- Website: Public Transport Victoria

History
- Opened: 19 December 1859; 166 years ago
- Rebuilt: 1981; 10 October 2014
- Electrified: May 1919 (1500 V DC overhead)

Passengers
- 2005–2006: 794,072
- 2006–2007: 893,591 ▲12.53%
- 2007–2008: 981,598 ▲9.84%
- 2008–2009: 1,098,892 ▲11.94%
- 2009–2010: 1,151,160 ▲4.75%
- 2010–2011: 1,163,197 ▲1.04%
- 2011–2012: 1,046,436 ▼10.03%
- 2012–2013: Not measured
- 2013–2014: 1,106,583 ▲5.74%
- 2014–2015: 1,098,253 ▼0.75%
- 2015–2016: 1,212,350 ▲10.38%
- 2016–2017: 1,271,058 ▲4.84%
- 2017–2018: 1,309,198 ▲3%
- 2018–2019: 1,114,565 ▼14.86%
- 2019–2020: 923,000 ▼17.18%
- 2020–2021: 416,700 ▼54.85%
- 2021–2022: 468,900 ▲12.52%
- 2022–2023: 726,350 ▲54.91%
- 2023–2024: 787,700 ▲8.45%
- 2024–2025: 752,350 ▼4.49%

Services
Preceding station	Metro Trains	Following station
Windsor towards Laverton, Werribee or Williamstown via Flinders Street	Sandringham line	Ripponlea towards Sandringham
Track layout
Location

Balaclava station is a railway station operated by Metro Trains Melbourne on the Sandringham line, part of the Melbourne rail network. It serves the south-eastern suburb of Balaclava, in Melbourne, Victoria, Australia. Balaclava station is a ground level premium station, featuring two side platforms, with a customer service desk on platform 1. It opened on 19 December 1859, with the current station provided in 2014.

Balaclava is an elevated station, and is located above the Carlisle Street rail overpass.

== History ==
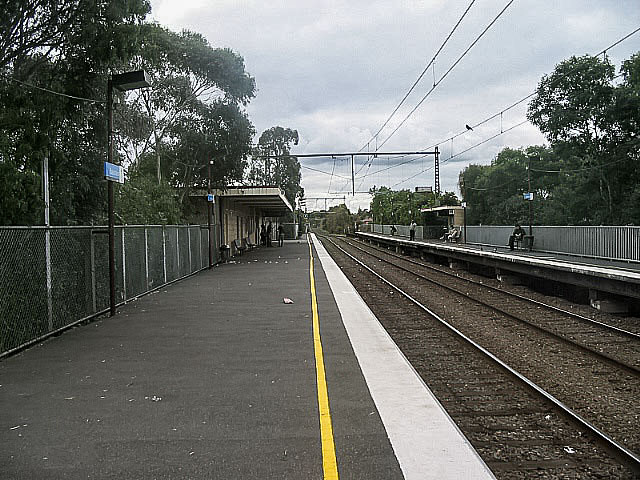
North-west bound view from Platform 1, January 2007

Balaclava station opened on 19 December 1859, when the railway line from Windsor was extended to North Brighton. Like the suburb itself, the station was named after the Battle of Balaclava, which occurred during the Crimean War in 1854.

On 3 December 1977, the station was damaged by fire. In 1981, the station buildings were rebuilt.

In 1996, two men found $200,000 in a drum buried beneath one of the platforms. They handed the money in to the police and the find was reported in the media. In the same week, another man found a second drum under the platform, containing a similar quantity of money, which he also turned in to the police. Because no one claimed it, the men were granted ownership of the money they found, despite being considered trespassers on land owned by the then Public Transport Corporation.

In June 2012, a $13.3 million upgrade to the station was announced. It involved widening the platforms, improving stair and ramp access, signage, booking office facilities, waiting rooms, wheelchair shelters and toilets, and the provision of new station canopies to increase weather protection. CCTV cameras were added, as well as provision for future lifts. In October 2014, construction works were completed, with Balaclava upgraded to a premium station.

Following a 2019 commitment by the Federal Government, the station was due to receive an upgraded commuter car-park. However, this was scrapped by the same government in 2021.

== Platforms and services ==
Balaclava has two side platforms. It is served by Sandringham line trains.

Balaclava platform arrangement
Platform	Line	Destination	Via	Service Type	Notes	Source
1	Sandringham line	Laverton, Werribee or Williamstown	Flinders Street	All stations	Services to Laverton and Williamstown only operate on weekdays.	
2	Sandringham line	Sandringham		All stations		

== Transport links ==
Yarra Trams operates two routes via Balaclava station:

- : Melbourne University – East Malvern
- : Melbourne University – Kew
