= Albert Rose =

Albert Rose may refer to:

- Albert Rose (physicist) (1910–1990), American physicist
- Albert Rose (athlete) (1901–1961), American track and field athlete
- Albert Rose (wrestler) (1881–1962), competed in Wrestling at the 1908 Summer Olympics – Men's Greco-Roman lightweight
- Alby Rose (1875–1921), Australian rules footballer

== See also ==
- Bert Rose (1919–2001), football executive
- Albert Rose-Innes (1868–1946), cricketer
- Albert Rosen (1924–1997), conductor
- Albert Roze (1861–1952), French sculptor
- Albert Ross (disambiguation)
