= Albert Ross =

Albert Ross may refer to:

== People ==
- Albert Ross (Albatros), whose name is reputed to inspire Albatros automobiles
- Albert Ross (footballer) (1916–1998), English footballer
- Albert Randolph Ross (1868–1948), American architect with widespread works
- Albert S. Ross, architect in Oklahoma, United States
- Albert Henry Ross (1881–1950), English advertising agent and freelance writer
- Albert Ross, defendant of the United States v. Ross court case
- Albert Ross, founded the company that became the bicycle company Ross
- Albert Ross, co-collaborator of the song, "Ahoy There!", from the Mr. Scruff album, Trouser Jazz
- Albert Henderson Wade Ross (1884–1939), American lawyer, newspaper owner, and baseball team owner
- Albert Frederick Ross Jr. (1894–1974), American politician from California

== Other uses ==
- Albert Ross, fictional character of the 1987 novel Dirk Gently's Holistic Detective Agency
- Albert Ross, fictional one-time character, portrayed by John Henshaw, of "The Heart of a Man", the television episode of Heartbeat
- "Albert Ross", song by Deviations Project from self-titled album, derivative of Fleetwood Mac song, "Albatross"
- "Albert Ross", song by Medium 21 from Killings from the Dial

== See also ==
- Al Ross (disambiguation)
