= Ripponlea =

- Suburb
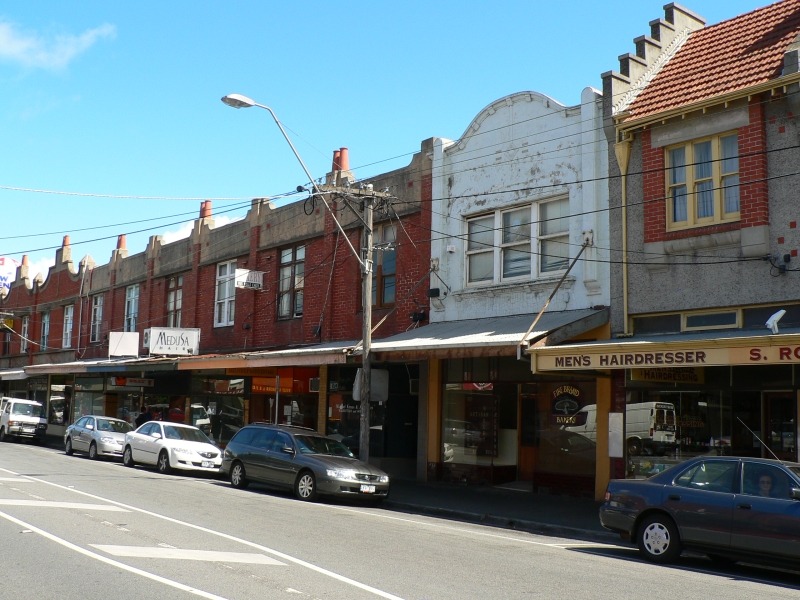
- Edwardian shopfronts at Ripponlea village, Glen Eira Road.

- Interactive map of Ripponlea
- Coordinates: 37.88°S 144.999°E
- Country: Australia
- State: Victoria
- City: Melbourne
- LGA: City of Port Phillip
- Location: 7 km (4.3 mi) from Melbourne

Government
  - State electorate: Caulfield
  - Federal division: Macnamara

Area
  - Total: 0.3 km^{2} (0.12 sq mi)
- Elevation: 18 m (59 ft)

Population
  - Total: 1,532 (2021 census)
  - Density: 5,100/km^{2} (13,200/sq mi)
- Postcode: 3185
Suburbs around Ripponlea
	Balaclava	St Kilda East
Elwood	Ripponlea	Elsternwick
Elwood	Brighton	Elsternwick

Ripponlea is an inner suburb in Melbourne, Victoria, Australia, 7 km south-east of Melbourne's Central Business District, located within the City of Port Phillip local government area. Ripponlea recorded a population of 1,532 at the 2021 census.

Named after the adjoining Rippon Lea Estate, Ripponlea is centred on the intersection of Glen Eira Road and Hotham Street. In terms of its cadastral division, Ripponlea is in the Parish of Prahran, within the County of Bourke.

== Boundaries ==
Ripponlea is known for its triangle shape, being bounded by Nepean Highway to the west, Hotham Street to the east and Glen Eira Road to the north. However, its official northern boundaries actually follow Albion Street and Oak Grove.

== History ==
The suburb is named after the Rippon Lea Estate.

Quat Quatta is another historic building, being built in 1890 and is now a popular place for weddings.

The Australian Broadcasting Corporation's Ripponlea television studios were built in 1954 on land compulsorily acquired from the Rippon Lea Estate, by the Victorian State Government. The studios closed in 2017.

== Notable landmarks ==
The main attraction of Ripponlea is the Rippon Lea Estate, a massive mansion with 7 acres of gardens that is heritage listed and is owned by the National Trust. Glen Eira Road is the suburb's main street, with almost all of the shops being housed here. Ripponlea is also home to a synagogue. In December 2024, the synagogue was damaged in a suspected arson attack.

== Transport ==
Ripponlea is connected to the Melbourne rail network, with Ripponlea station on the Sandringham line. The 623 and 603 bus routes also pass through Ripponlea, and the route 67 tram runs along Nepean Highway.

== Culture ==
Ripponlea is very multicultural, as in the 2016 Census, 20.1% identified as English, below Victoria's state average of 22%. The next most common ancestries were Australian at 16.6%, Irish at 10.6%, Scottish at 6.3% and German at 3.4%. Ripponlea's main street, Glen Eira Road, has many different restaurants, including Indian, Mexican and Italian.

== Gallery ==
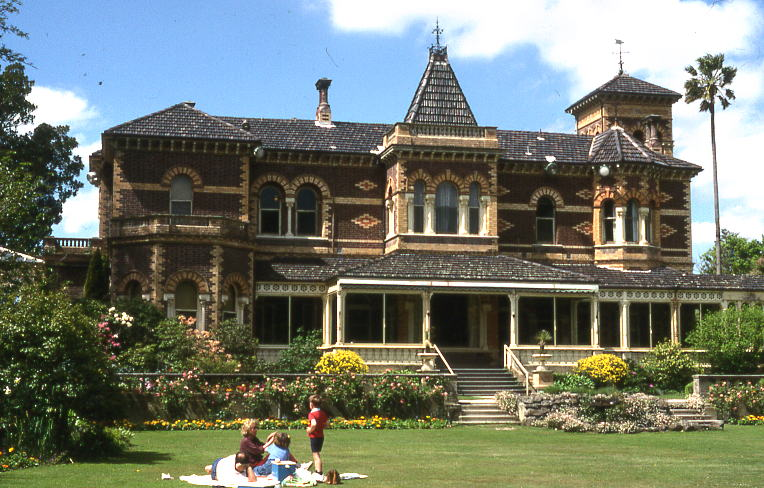
Rippon Lea Estate

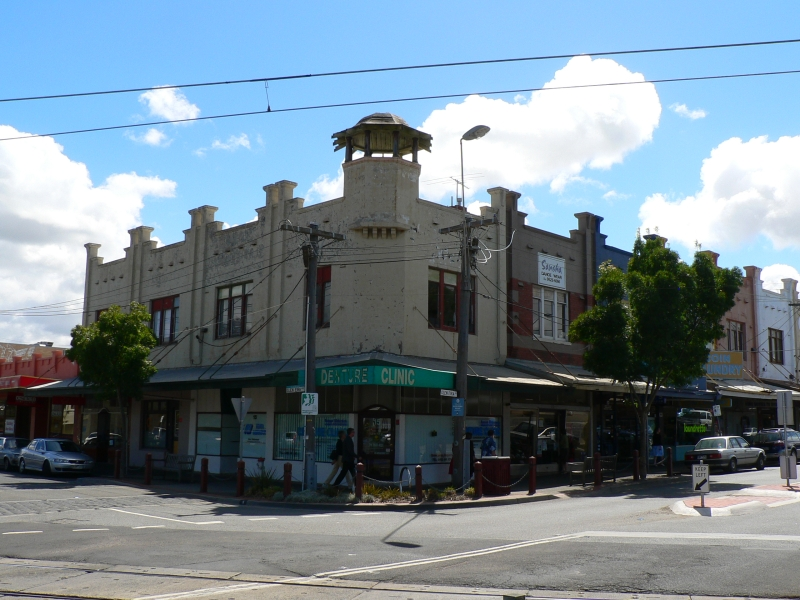
Shops at the corner of Glen Eira Road and Glen Eira Avenue

== See also ==
- City of St Kilda – Ripponlea was previously within this former local government area.
