= The Wrong Road (disambiguation) =

The Wrong Road is a 1937 American film directed by James Cruze.

The Wrong Road or Wrong Road may also refer to:

- "The Wrong Road", a song by The Go-Betweens from the 1986 album Liberty Belle and the Black Diamond Express
- "The Wrong Road", a song by The Radiators from the 2001 album The Radiators
- "The Wrong Road", a song by Medium 21 from the 2003 album Killings From the Dial
- "Wrong Road", an episode of Thomas & Friends (series 2)
- "Wrong Roads", an episode of the TV series Justified
