= Gardenvale railway station =

Railway station in Melbourne, Australia

Gardenvale
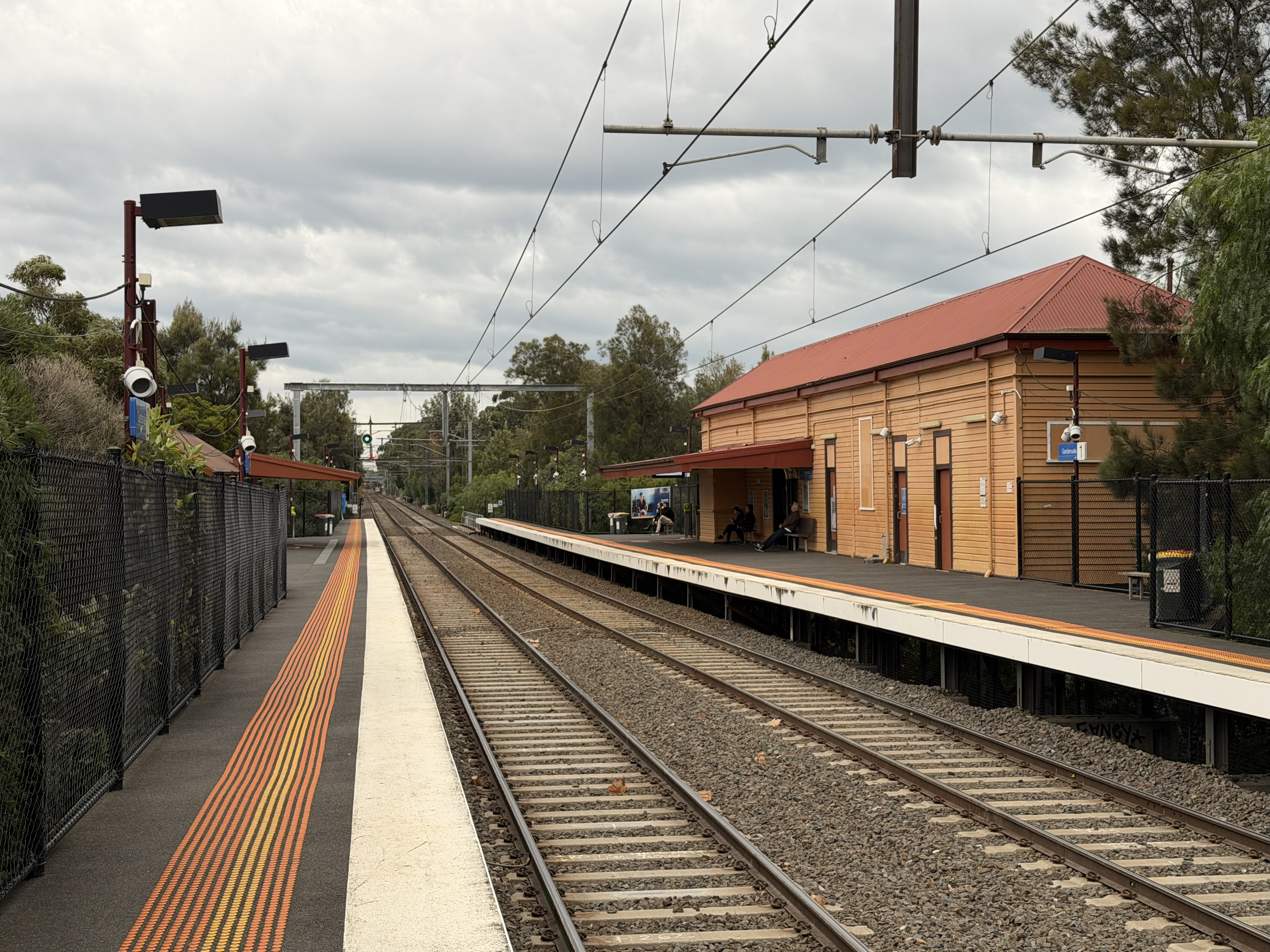
- Southbound view from Platform 2, June 2026

General information
- Location: Martin Street, Brighton, Victoria 3186; City of Bayside; Australia
- Coordinates: 37°53′48″S 145°00′15″E
- System: PTV commuter rail station
- Owner: VicTrack
- Operator: Metro Trains
- Line: Sandringham
- Distance: 12.35 kilometres from Southern Cross
- Platforms: 2 side
- Tracks: 2
- Connections: Bus

Construction
- Structure type: Elevated
- Accessible: No—steep ramp

Other information
- Status: Operational, unstaffed
- Station code: GVE
- Fare zone: Myki zone 1
- Website: Public Transport Victoria

History
- Opened: 10 December 1906; 119 years ago
- Electrified: May 1919 (1500 V DC overhead)

Passengers
- 2005–2006: 365,041
- 2006–2007: 401,422 ▲9.96%
- 2007–2008: 432,862 ▲7.83%
- 2008–2009: 449,591 ▲3.86%
- 2009–2010: 453,243 ▲0.81%
- 2010–2011: 481,120 ▲6.15%
- 2011–2012: 459,930 ▼4.4%
- 2012–2013: Not measured
- 2013–2014: 472,094 ▲2.64%
- 2014–2015: 468,768 ▼0.7%
- 2015–2016: 552,161 ▲17.79%
- 2016–2017: 556,537 ▲0.79%
- 2017–2018: 551,361 ▼0.93%
- 2018–2019: 518,037 ▼6.04%
- 2019–2020: 421,550 ▼18.62%
- 2020–2021: 185,050 ▼56.1%
- 2021–2022: 217,150 ▲17.34%
- 2022–2023: 356,400 ▲64.13%
- 2023–2024: 396,750 ▲11.29%
- 2024–2025: 380,050 ▼4.21%

Services
Preceding station	Metro Trains	Following station
Elsternwick towards Laverton, Werribee or Williamstown via Flinders Street	Sandringham line	North Brighton towards Sandringham
Track layout
Location

Gardenvale station is a railway station operated by Metro Trains Melbourne on the Sandringham line, part of the Melbourne rail network. It serves the south-eastern suburb of Brighton, in Melbourne, Victoria, Australia. Gardenvale station is an elevated unstaffed station, featuring two side platforms. It opened on 10 December 1906.

The station has two side platforms, and is located in an unusual elevated position, located between the Nepean Highway and Martin Street, with access to the station from both.

== History ==
Gardenvale station opened on 10 December 1906, with the whole cost of providing the station met by local residents of the district. The origins of the name of the station, and the suburb itself, are uncertain, although it may have been inspired by nearby market gardens throughout the undulating countryside.

In 1928, the rail bridge over Martin Street, which restored a link between both sections of the street, was constructed, with most of the cost being met by the Brighton and Caulfield councils, and local businesses.

In 1972, the current girder bridge over the Nepean Highway was provided. During the widening of the Nepean Highway in the late 1970s and early 1980s, as the previous rail embankment was removed, the former trestle bridge crossing Elster Creek was uncovered.

There is a large weatherboard building on Platform 1, with a smaller weatherboard building on Platform 2. On 7 December 2009, the building on Platform 1 was severely damaged by fire, which investigators described as suspicious. In January 2011, restoration of the building began, with reconstruction work being completed by the middle of that year.

== Platforms and services ==
Gardenvale has two side platforms. It is serviced by Metro Trains' Sandringham line services.

Gardenvale platform arrangement
Platform	Line	Destination	Via	Service Type	Notes	Source
1	Sandringham line	Laverton, Werribee or Williamstown	Flinders Street	All stations	Services to Laverton and Williamstown only operate on weekdays.	
2	Sandringham line	Sandringham		All stations		

== Transport links ==
CDC Melbourne operates three bus routes via Gardenvale station, under contract to Public Transport Victoria:

- 605 : Gardenvale – City (Queen Victoria Market)
- 626 : Middle Brighton station – Chadstone Shopping Centre
- 630 : Elwood – Monash University Clayton Campus
