= Alfred Ross =

Alfred Ross may refer to:

- Alfred Ross (politician) (1816–1896), merchant, banker and politician in colonial Victoria (Australia)
- Alf Ross (1899–1979), Danish legal and moral philosopher

== See also ==
- Samuel Alfred Ross (1870–1929), Liberian politician
- Alfred Clunies-Ross (c. 1851–1903), Cocos Island-born rugby union player, represented Scotland
- Al Ross (disambiguation)
