= Cremorne Gardens, Melbourne =

Former pleasure garden in Melbourne, Australia

Cremorne Gardens
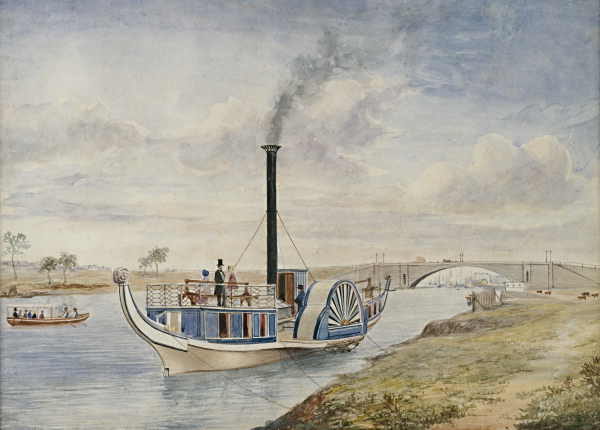
- Paddle-steamer Gondola near the original Princes Bridge, Melbourne, on its way to Cremorne Gardens, 1855

- Location within Melbourne
- Interactive map of Cremorne Gardens
- Type: Pleasure garden
- Location: Richmond, Melbourne, Victoria, Australia
- Coordinates: 37°49′52″S 144°59′29″E
- Area: c.16 ha (40 acres)
- Opened: 1853
- Closed: 9 February 1863
- Founder: James Ellis
- Etymology: Cremorne Gardens, London
- Owner: James Ellis (1853–1855); W. P. Scott (1855); G. V. Brooke (1856–1859); George Coppin (1856–1863)
- Open: 10am and 11pm
- Status: Closed
- Water: Yarra River

Cremorne Gardens was a 16-hectare (40-acre) pleasure garden (Note: Referred to as amusement parks in common parlance.) that was located on the banks of the Yarra River at Richmond in Melbourne, Victoria, Australia. Established in 1853 as Melbourne's first amusement park, the gardens featured fireworks displays, tightrope dancers and Australia's first hot air balloon ascent. At their peak, the Gardens attracted 10,000 visitors every day and night. They were closed in February 1863, after financial difficulties.

== Description ==
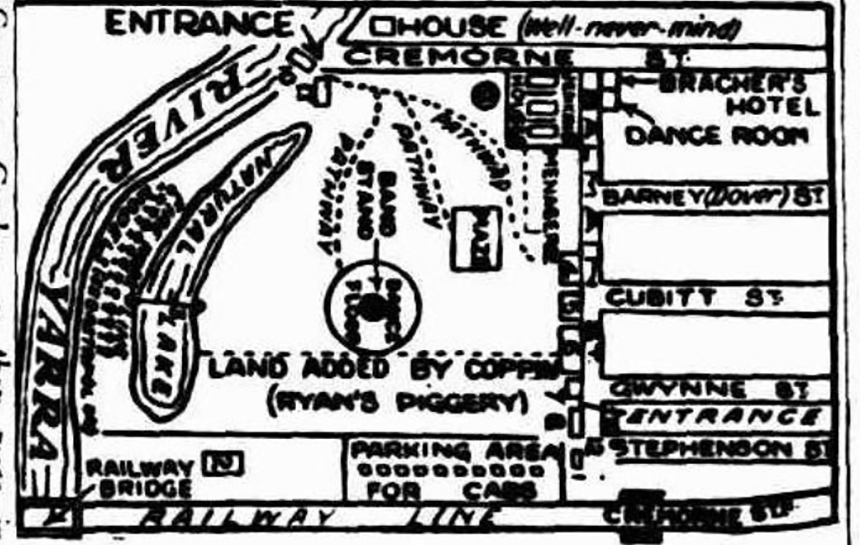
Cremorne Gardens as they were c. 1860. From a plan prepared by Mr. W. Jamieson of the Lands Department. Key to numbers: 1. Higgins's Pantechnicon, 2. Kirk's house, 3. trestles and tightrope, 4. Coppin's house, 5. side shows, 6. Pantheon Theatre, 7. refreshment booth, 8. Crystal Bar, 9. gasometer, 10. landing stage for gondolas, 11. Peachman's Hotel, 12. Cherry Tree Hotel

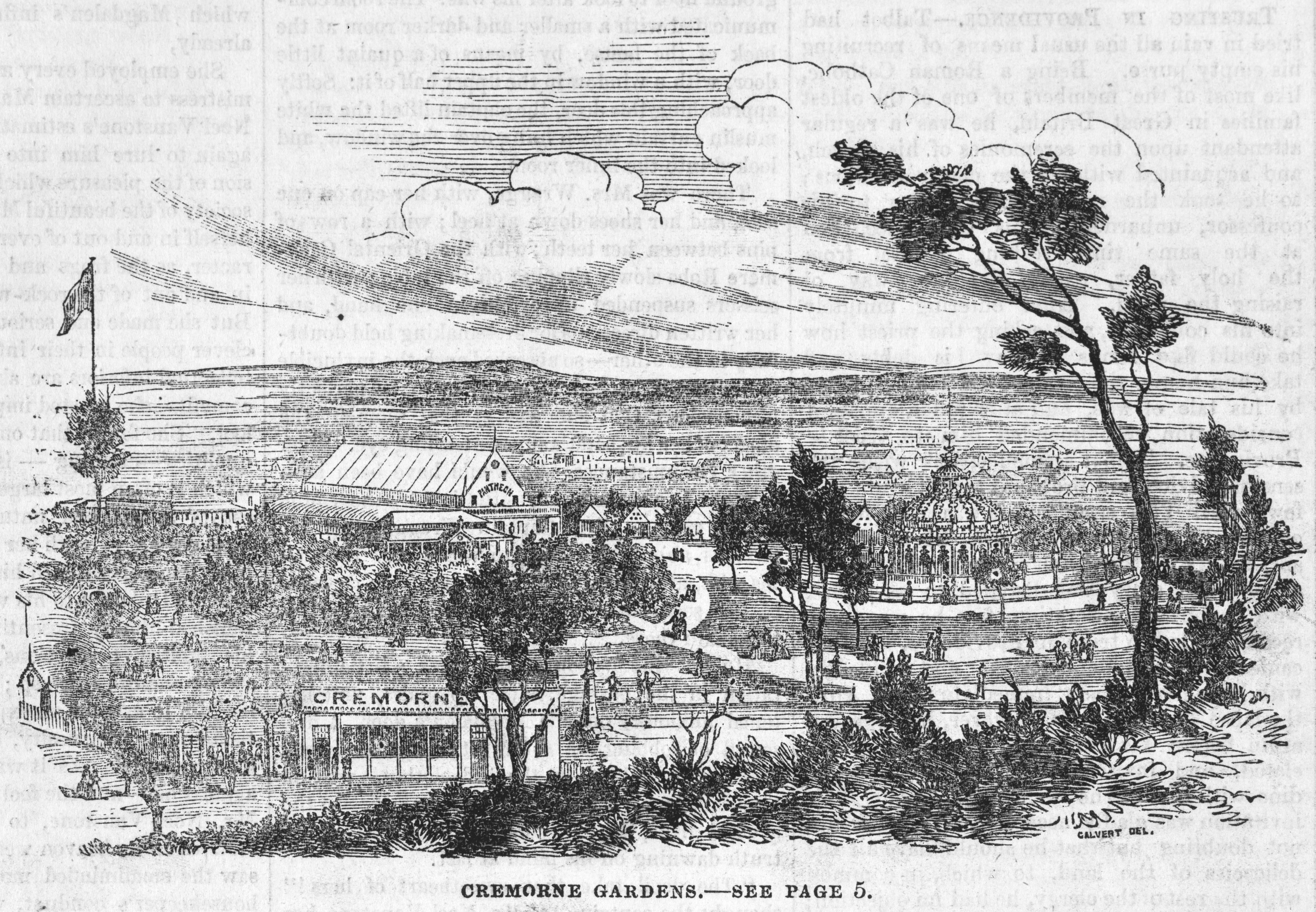
Lithograph of Cremorne Gardens in 1862

=== Establishment by Ellis ===
James Ellis had earlier managed and leased the eponymous Cremorne Gardens on the banks of the River Thames at Chelsea in London. He had been declared bankrupt and emigrated to Australia to take advantage of the business opportunities made possible by the Victorian gold rush and its accompanying population explosion.

His first venture in the entertainment world in Melbourne was Astley's Amphitheatre, but his experiences in catering in London inclined him to a profit-making business with a wider basis. Having already established contacts in the theatrical world of London from previous work, he took advantage of them to create a venue with viable entertainments to divert the population of the rapidly expanding capital of the new Australian state where entertainment was demanded by a predominantly male society.

The gardens brought theatre and spectacle to the newly established British colony. However, the wowser element in Melbourne did not approve of the pleasure gardens. Ellis had invested a lot of money in them and they were very popular, but criticism of the availability of liquor and the use of the venue by prostitutes went against him. Ellis tried to gain social favour by donating percentages of profits to charity but that did not help him. The disapproval was an attitude which had frequently been expressed about the large pleasure gardens in London on which Ellis had based his colonial duplicate. It would not, however, have been beneath Ellis to take advantage of the needs of diggers holidaying in Melbourne and on the hunt for a bit of fun.

His detractors forced his sale of Cremorne Gardens but they survived in the hands of someone who had the skill and experience to administer and develop them. Ellis went on to own a hotel in Fitzroy.

=== Acquisition by Coppin and Brooke ===
Acquired in 1856 by George Coppin, a theatrical entrepreneur and popular local identity, jointly with G. V. Brooke, an Irish actor. Together, they expanded the gardens significantly to c.16 hectares (40 acres), using even better contacts in the world of English theatre than Ellis enjoyed. Brooke took over the Theatre Royal in 1859 leaving Coppin as the sole owner of the Cremorne Gardens. Cremorne became his indulgence and hobby and he poured money into it without applying business acumen. For a time he lived on site; the residence had been built by the colonial architect, Henry Ginn, who had originally established the gardens in the mid-1840s as part of his up-river retreat.

George Buller, in a 1921 series published in the Richmond Guardian reminisced:

"The gardens included every amusement that could be obtained. A theatre…; a menagerie, consisting of lions, tigers, bears, monkeys and an elephant…, a dancing pagoda, with a central bandstand…; a maze, to amuse any who wanted to try and lose themselves; a lake the whole width of the grounds, with a large fireworks stand representing the Siege of Sevastopol. This was painted in oils by Mr. Wilson, the scenic artist, who died in Sydney some time ago. He was brought from England by Mr. Coppin specially for the purpose.
"A good show of fireworks was given each night from this stand and was one of the most popular attractions. The whole garden was one blaze of light and illumination, as all the flower beds were picked out with different colored oil lamps. For the benefit of the thirsty there were three hotels — one at the entrance, another near the theatre, and another at the river entrance. There was also a refreshment-room at either side of the theatre; whilst on the other side there was a regular olla podrida of small side-shows — fruit barrows, Aunt Sallies, try-your-weights, skittles, bowls, oyster barrows, etc. The price of admission varied from a few shillings to a guinea for bal masque nights, when things were lively. Residents who lived adjacent did not get much sleep from the singing and drunken merriment of those returning to the city with their ladies."

Entertainment provided included a cyclorama, bowling alley, menagerie, dancers and nightly fireworks. In 1856, he opened his Royal Pantheon Theatre, initially managed by R. Younge (brother of Fred), followed by J. P. Greville. Coppin continued the presentation of the annual panoramas introduced by Ellis. Patrons arrived by riverboat or train at the purpose-built railway station.

The gardens were notable as being the location of the first balloon flight in Australia when in 1858 Englishman William Dean floated eleven kilometres (7 mi) north to Brunswick. In 1859 Coppin imported six camels from Aden as exhibits for the Cremorne Gardens menagerie and in 1860 he sold them to the Exploration Committee of the Royal Society of Victoria who used them on the Burke and Wills expedition.

=== Closure and subsequent land use ===
In the 1860s, the Gardens became hugely unprofitable and could no longer be maintained; Coppin closed the doors in February 1863. The land was sold and became a private lunatic asylum, which itself closed in the 1880s. The land was then subdivided for housing by Thomas Bent. With the turn of the century, much of the housing gave way to industrial establishments of varying sizes, but much of the small working-class housing remains and has been progressively gentrified.

A small park at the southern end of the area previously occupied by the gardens has a plaque marking their location and the place from which the hot-air balloons were launched. The site of the gardens no longer fronts the river because of the construction of the South Eastern Freeway in 1961. The area of Richmond in which the gardens were located was formally renamed Cremorne in 1999 and while it might be used by locals out of respect to its history, it also avoids the old working-class association with the name Richmond.

== Legacy ==
A view of Cremorne from South Yarra can be found in the works of S. T. Gill and the site is described in Louisa Ann Meredith's account of her stay in Melbourne with her husband and son: Over the straits: a visit to Victoria. The site now includes an artwork by Ugo Rondinone called Our Magic Hour.

== See also ==
- Parks and gardens of Melbourne
- List of amusement parks in Victoria
