= Al Ross =

Al Ross may refer to:

- Al Ross (cartoonist); see Arlen Roth
- Al Ross (businessman), owner of Doggie Diner

== See also ==
- Albert Ross (disambiguation)
- Alfred Ross (disambiguation)
