= Gardenvale =

- Suburb
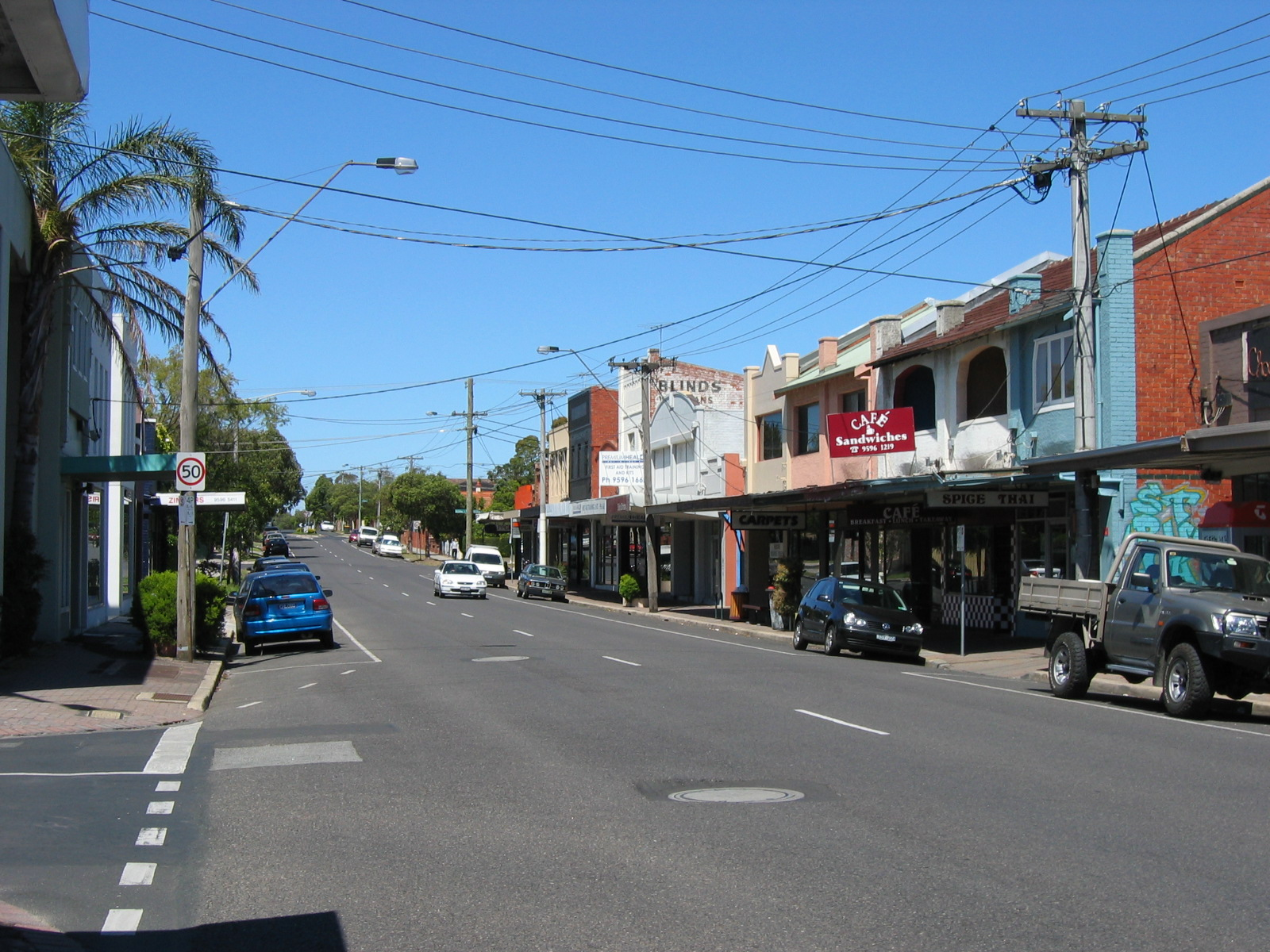
- Shopping strip on Gardenvale Road, Gardenvale, Victoria.

- Interactive map of Gardenvale
- Coordinates: 37.899°S 145.007°E
- Country: Australia
- State: Victoria
- City: Melbourne
- LGA: City of Glen Eira
- Location: 12 km (7.5 mi) from Melbourne
- Established: 1908

Government
  - State electorate: Caulfield
  - Federal division: Goldstein

Area
  - Total: 0.3 km^{2} (0.12 sq mi)
- Elevation: 12 m (39 ft)

Population
  - Total: 1,019 (2021 census)
  - Density: 3,400/km^{2} (8,800/sq mi)
- Postcode: 3185
Suburbs around Gardenvale
	Elsternwick	Caulfield South
Brighton	Gardenvale	Caulfield South
	Brighton East	Brighton East

Gardenvale is a suburb in Melbourne, Victoria, Australia, 10 km (6.2 mi) south-east of the Melbourne central business district, located within the City of Glen Eira local government area. Gardenvale recorded a population of 1,019 at the 2021 census.

== History ==
Prior to subdivision in 1908, the area was a paddock owned by the Lemprière family, and was in use for a polo ground. The Lemprières were a prominent Caulfield family with several members serving on the Caulfield Council.

The railway station, built in 1907, was named Garden Vale - the origins of the name are unknown, but it is possibly due to market gardens in the surrounding countryside.

A Garden Vale East Post Office opened in 1914, and was renamed Garden Vale in 1922 and Gardenvale about 1940. Also a Post Office opened in 1891 as Elsternwick Receiving House, and was renamed Elsternwick West in 1908, Gardenvale in 1909, Garden Vale in 1910, Garden Vale West in 1922, Gardenvale West about 1940 and closed in 1986.

The development of Garden Vale proved to be controversial, mainly because of arguments over who would pay to drain the land. Much of the area's land was too wet to be built upon without appropriate drainage being installed, and by 1911, several neighbouring estates, the Council and Victorian Railways all had a stake in the outcome. By 1913, the area had a progress association and in 1916, the council surveyor prepared plans for the four north–south streets in Gardenvale, which were already availed of a small but growing retail centre.

The name was gazetted as a suburb name in 1966.

A Church known as St James was in Gardenvale but was destroyed by fire in 2016.

The local Catholic Primary school is St James Brighton

== Education ==
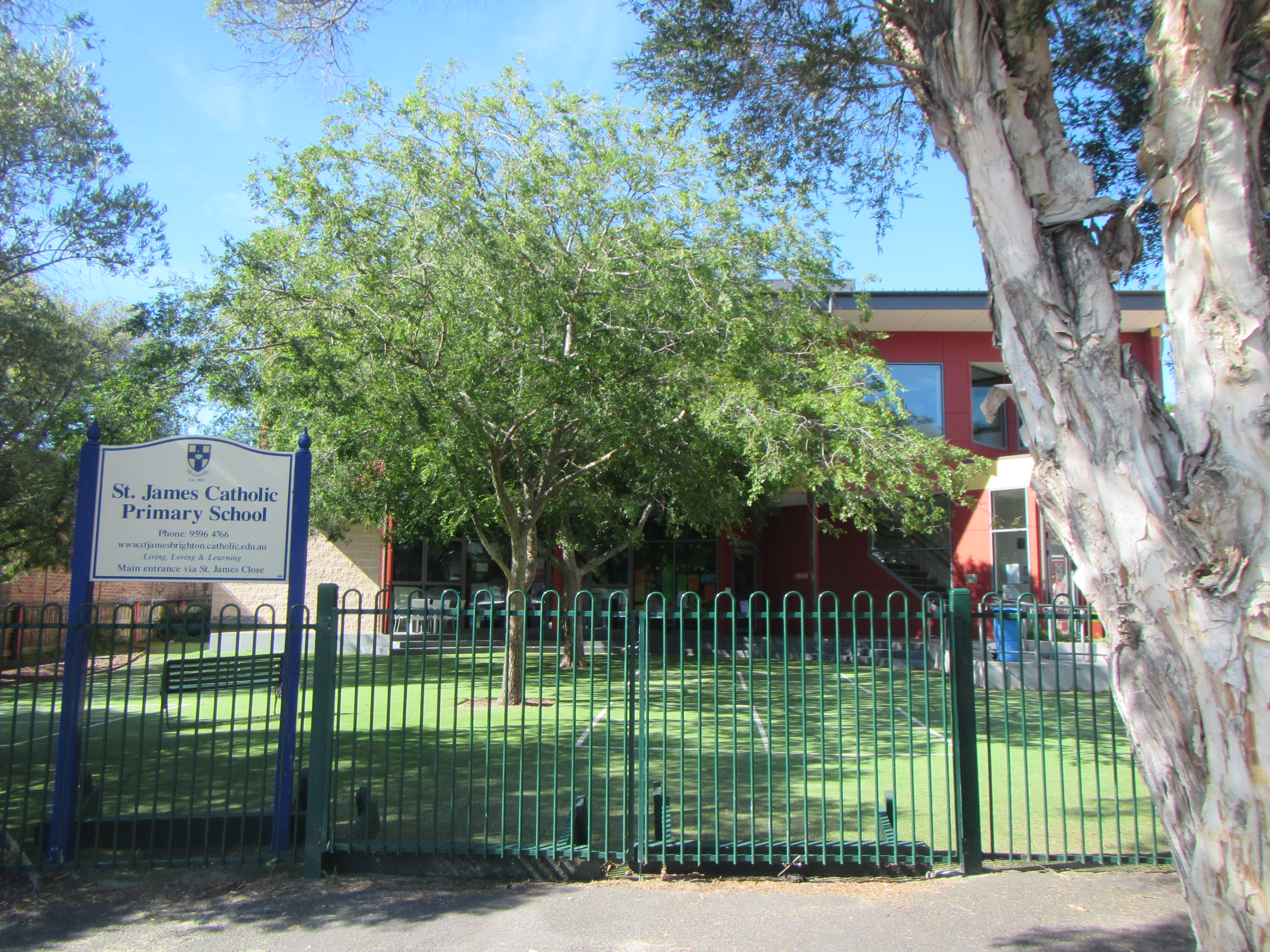
St James Primary School

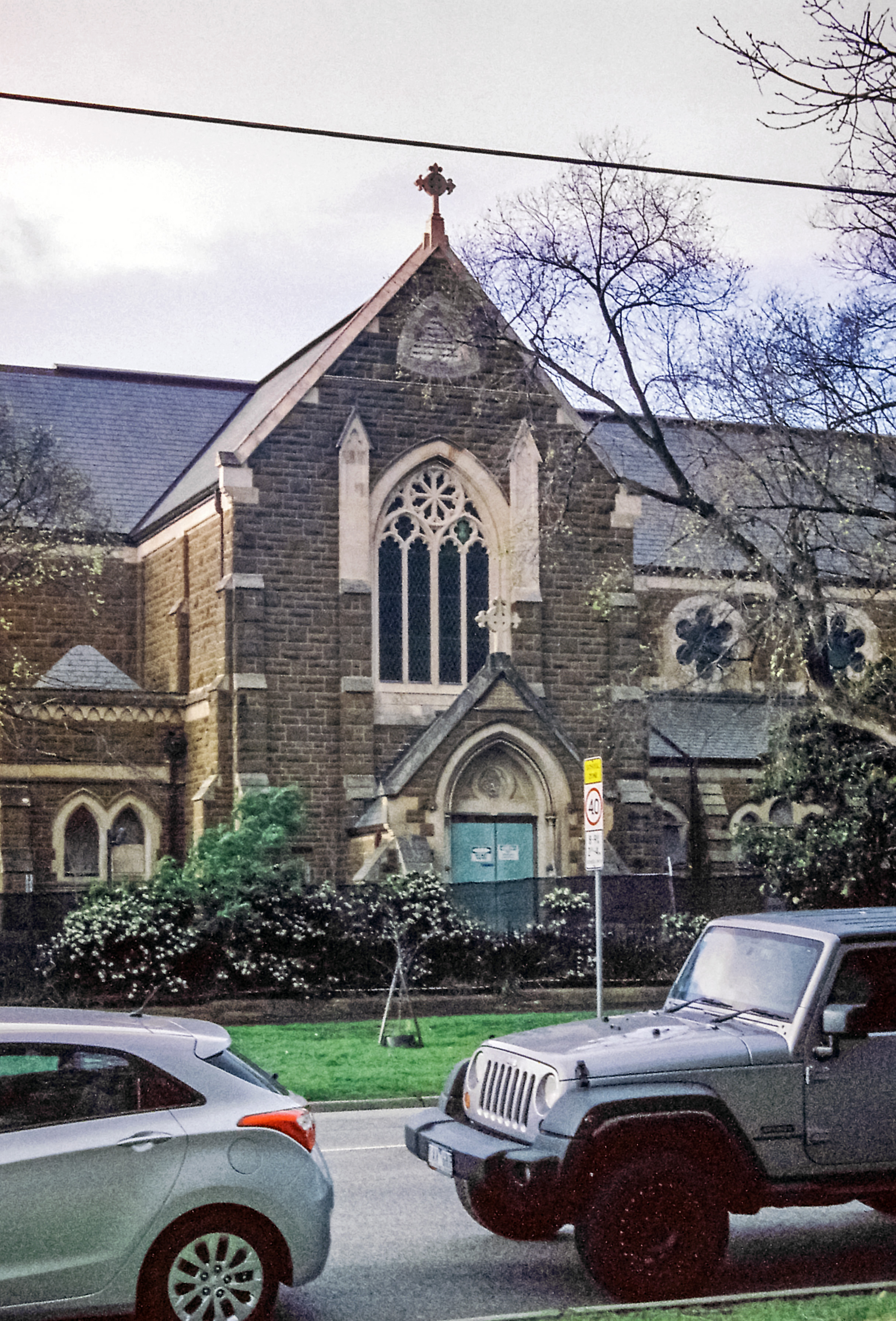
St James Gardenvale Church which was burnt down

== Geography ==
The suburb is a mostly residential area with a strip shopping centre on Gardenvale Road. The suburb is bounded by Nepean Highway to the west, Elster Avenue to the north, Kooyong Road to the east and North Road to the south, and the Elster Creek flows through the suburb before entering the Elwood Canal.

The name Gardenvale is also used as a locality name with less definite boundaries. The railway station, built in the 19th century as part of the Rosstown Railway, was located a few blocks further North on the corner of Riddell Parade and Clarence Street in what is now officially part of Elsternwick. A section of Brighton in the City of Bayside (bounded by Nepean Highway, Bridge/Head Street, New Street and North Road) is also usually called Gardenvale, while postal addresses are officially Brighton or Brighton North.

It is the smallest suburb in Melbourne by area, at just 26 hectares in size.

== Transport ==
Gardenvale is 12 km from the Melbourne central business district via the Nepean Highway, which enters the city as St Kilda Road. North Road connects the suburb with Monash University at Clayton, Oakleigh and Mulgrave.

Gardenvale is serviced by two bus routes, operated by CDC Melbourne:

- 605 City (Queen Street) – Gardenvale via Kooyong Road
- 630 Elwood – Monash University via Ormond station.

There is also Gardenvale railway station on the Sandringham line, which is actually located in Brighton. In December 2009, the station building on Platform 1 was destroyed by fire. It took 30–40 minutes for the fire to be extinguished. While the tracks and power lines were not affected, the fire caused $150,000 in damages to the platform.

== Postcodes ==
Prior to 2000, Gardenvale was one of several small Melbourne suburbs with two postcodes - being served by both Elsternwick (3185) to its north, and Brighton East (3187) to its south. However, from 2000 onwards, only 3185 was valid.

== See also ==
- City of Caulfield – Gardenvale was previously within this former local government area.
