= Alby Rose =

Australian rules footballer

Personal information
- Full name: Albert Rose
- Born: 1 October 1875; Emerald Hill, Victoria
- Died: 31 May 1921 (aged 45); Gardenvale, Victoria
- Original team: Pembroke

Playing career^{1}
Years	Club	Games (Goals)
1900–1902	South Melbourne	12 (11)
- ^{1} Playing statistics correct to the end of 1902.

Albert Rose (1 October 1875 – 31 May 1921) was an Australian rules footballer who played for the South Melbourne Football Club in the Victorian Football League (VFL).

He also spent some time in South Africa, where he played two first-class cricket matches for Transvaal.
