= Al Rosen (disambiguation) =

Al Rosen was an American baseball player and executive.

Al Rosen may also refer to:

== People ==
- Alan Rosen (c. 1943–2013; nicknamed "Mr. Mint"), American sports collectibles dealer
- Alan Rosen (restaurant owner) (born 1969), American restaurant and bakery owner, and author
- Alan Rosen, Australian psychiatrist, raised to Officer of the Order of Australia at the 2014 Queen's Birthday Honours (Australia)
- Al Rosen (actor) (1910–1990; Albert Rosen), American actor
- Albert Rosen (1924–1997), Austrian-born conductor
- Alfred Rosen, Australian politician, who stood for election in the district of Bondi

== Characters ==
- Judge Alan Rosen, a fictional character from the TV show Jury Duty (2023 TV series)

== See also ==
- Rosen (disambiguation)
- AL (disambiguation)
