= Cremorne railway station =

Former railway station in Melbourne, Victoria, Australia

Coordinates: 37°49′48″S 144°59′38″E

Cremorne
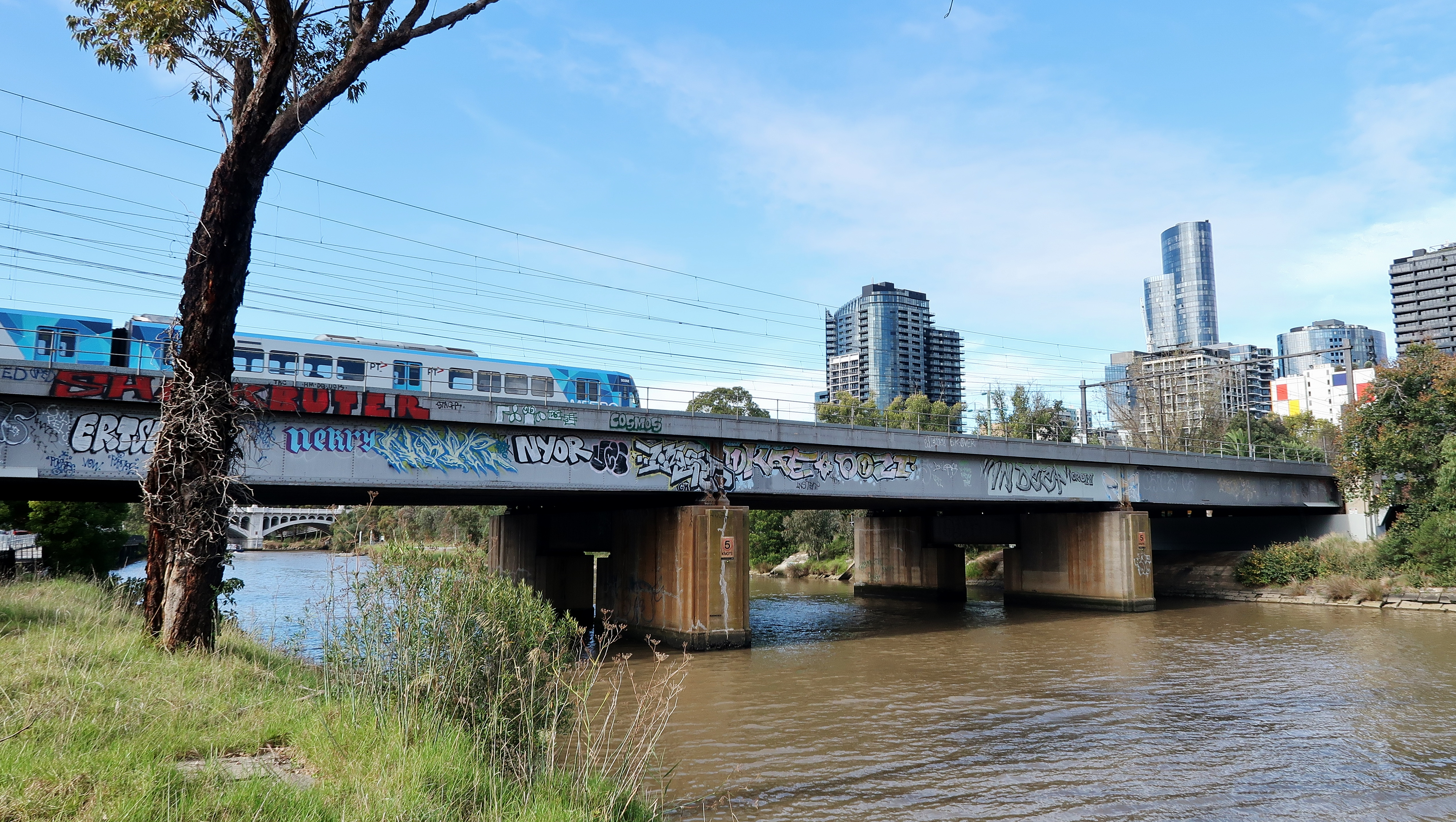
- Cremorne Railway Bridge near the former station site

General information
- Lines: Melbourne and Suburban Railway Company, now Sandringham railway line

Other information
- Status: Demolished

History
- Opened: 1859
- Closed: 1863

Services
Preceding station	Metro Trains	Following station
Richmond towards Flinders Street	Sandringham line	South Yarra towards Sandringham
List of closed railway stations in Melbourne
Location

Cremorne railway station was a short-lived inner suburban station in Melbourne, Australia, and was on the Melbourne and Suburban Railway Company’s line from Princes Bridge station to Windsor station, It was located just north of Balmain Street on the Melbourne side of the Yarra River bridge, in a part of the suburb of Richmond which is now known as Cremorne.

== History ==
The line was opened as far as Cremorne station in December 1859. One of the station's main functions was to encourage visitors to Melbourne's Cremorne Gardens. George Coppin, who was the proprietor of the attraction, lobbied the Melbourne and Suburban Railway Company, and then entered a financial arrangement with it, to expedite the building of the one-quarter mile (400 m), four-minute extension from Richmond railway station. Often the price of admission to the gardens included free return rail ticket from the city to Cremorne station.

The station consisted of a wooden platform located at the entrance to the Gardens.

Trains continued to stop at the station after the railway bridge over the Yarra from Cremorne to South Yarra was completed a year later.

The Cremorne Gardens closed in early 1863, and the last train known to have stopped at Cremorne station was on 23 November 1863, the day of the auction to dispose of the facilities and goods that remained in the Gardens.

In 1890, Richmond residents lobbied the Victorian Railways Commissioners to reopen the station, but their request was refused because the station was deemed "unnecessary". There is now no evidence of the station and subsequent track expansion has covered the area where it once stood.
