= Albert Ross (footballer) =

English footballer (1916–1998)

Personal information
- Full name: Albert Cyril Ross
- Date of birth: 7 October 1916
- Place of birth: York, England
- Date of death: 1998 (aged 81–82)
- Place of death: York, England
- Position: Full back

Senior career*
Years	Team	Apps	(Gls)
1933–1934	Arsenal	0	(0)
1934–1935	Gainsborough Trinity		
1935–1937	Middlesbrough	11	(0)
1937–1938	Bradford (Park Avenue)		
1938	Chelmsford City	0	(0)
1938–1939	Chester City	1	(0)
- Scarborough
- * Club domestic league appearances and goals

Albert Cyril Ross (7 October 1916 – 1998) was an English footballer who played as a full back.

== Career ==
In 1933, at the age of 17, Ross began his career at Arsenal, playing for the club's reserves. The following year, Ross returned north to sign for Gainsborough Trinity. In 1935, Ross joined Middlesbrough. At the club, Ross made eleven Football League appearances, before departing in March 1937 to sign for Bradford (Park Avenue). Ahead of the 1938–39 season, Ross signed for newly formed Chelmsford City, before joining Chester City before the start of the season. At Chester, Ross made a singular appearance, before joining Scarborough in July 1939.
