= North Brighton railway station =

Railway station in Melbourne, Australia

North Brighton
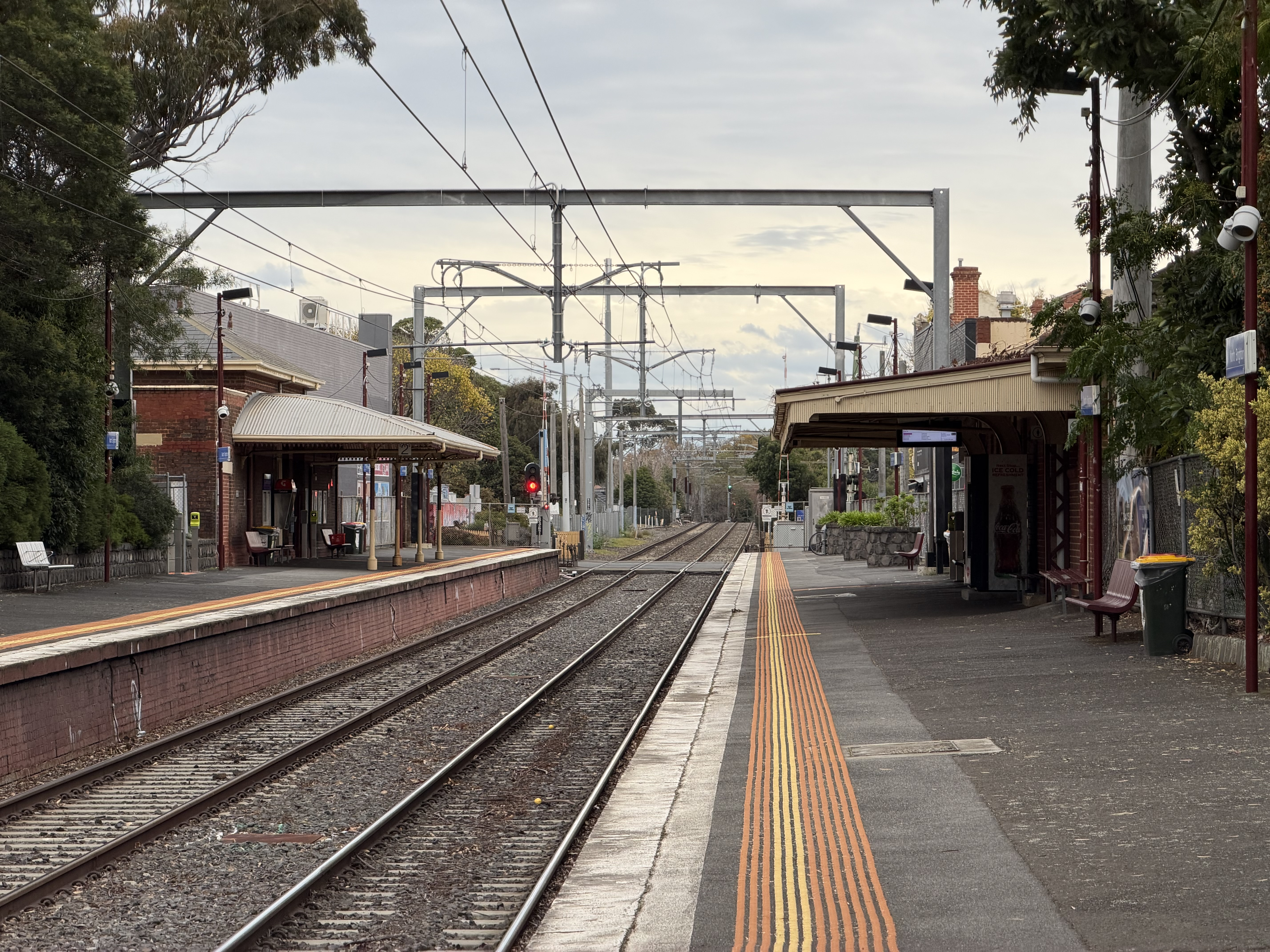
- Southbound view from Platform 1, June 2026

General information
- Location: Bay Street, Brighton, Victoria 3186; City of Bayside; Australia
- Coordinates: 37°54′17″S 145°00′09″E
- System: PTV commuter rail station
- Owner: VicTrack
- Operator: Metro Trains
- Line: Sandringham
- Distance: 13.24 kilometres from Southern Cross
- Platforms: 2 side
- Tracks: 2
- Connections: Bus; SkyBus

Construction
- Structure type: Ground
- Parking: 130
- Accessible: Yes—step free access

Other information
- Status: Operational, host station
- Station code: NBN
- Fare zone: Myki zone 1/2
- Website: Public Transport Victoria

History
- Opened: 19 December 1859; 166 years ago
- Electrified: May 1919 (1500 V DC overhead)
- Former names: Bay Street (1859–1866); Brighton (1908–1919)

Passengers
- 2005–2006: 669,180
- 2006–2007: 746,442 ▲11.54%
- 2007–2008: 801,042 ▲7.31%
- 2008–2009: 766,105 ▼4.36%
- 2009–2010: 800,521 ▲4.49%
- 2010–2011: 835,157 ▲4.32%
- 2011–2012: 821,694 ▼1.61%
- 2012–2013: Not measured
- 2013–2014: 650,446 ▼20.84%
- 2014–2015: 662,193 ▲1.8%
- 2015–2016: 755,217 ▲14.04%
- 2016–2017: 737,258 ▼2.37%
- 2017–2018: 717,895 ▼2.62%
- 2018–2019: 665,649 ▼7.27%
- 2019–2020: 554,050 ▼16.76%
- 2020–2021: 246,150 ▼55.57%
- 2021–2022: 291,000 ▲18.22%

Services
Preceding station	Metro Trains	Following station
Gardenvale towards Laverton, Werribee or Williamstown via Flinders Street	Sandringham line	Middle Brighton towards Sandringham
Track layout
Location

North Brighton station is a railway station operated by Metro Trains Melbourne on the Sandringham line, which is part of the Melbourne rail network. It serves the south-eastern suburb of Brighton, in Melbourne, Victoria, Australia. It was opened on 19 December 1859.

Opened as Bay Street, the station was subsequently renamed three time: to North Brighton on 1 January 1867, to Brighton on 1 December 1908, and back to North Brighton on 1 January 1920.

== History ==
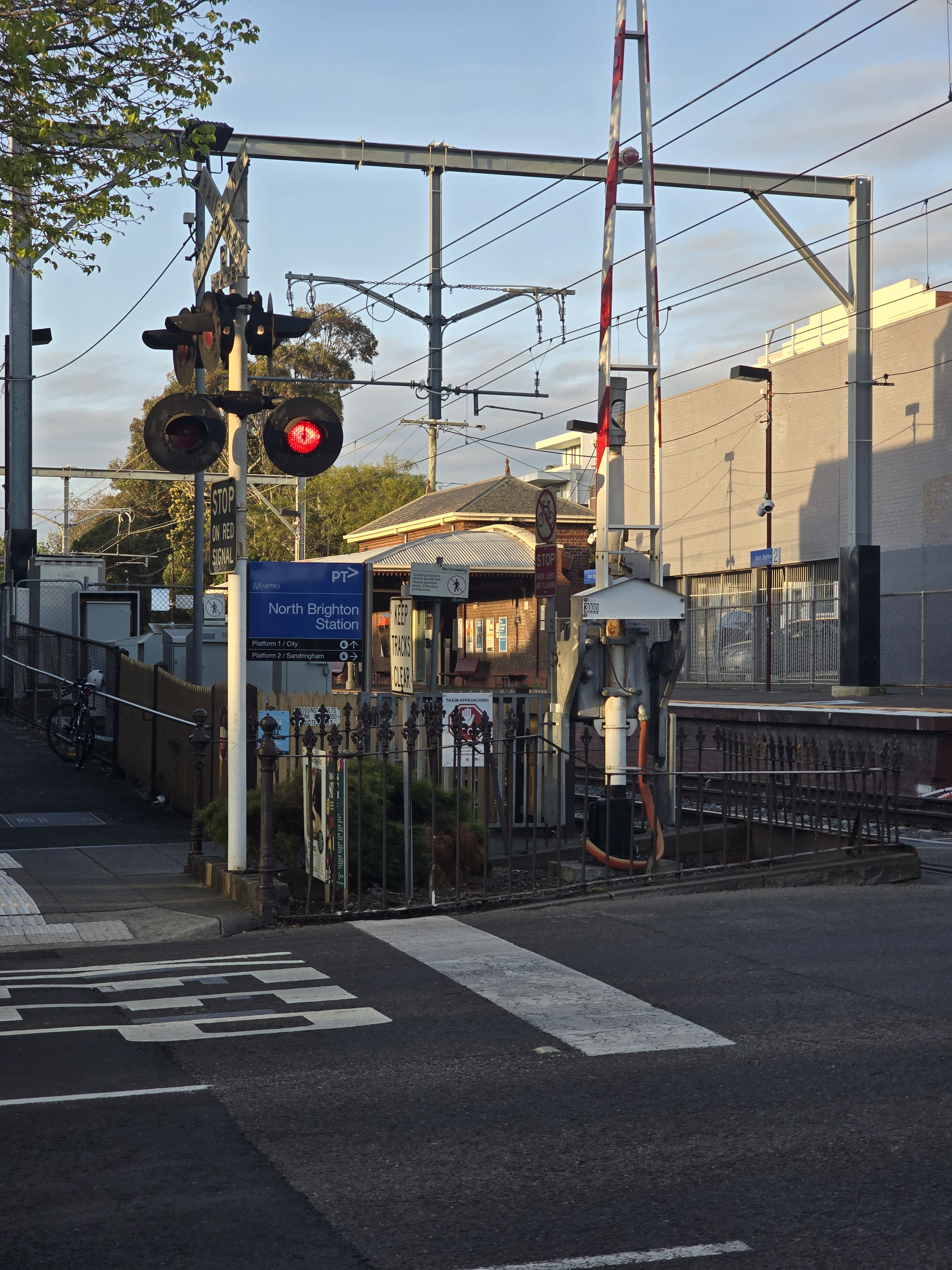
Bay Street level crossing, viewing to North Brighton Station, October 2024

North Brighton station opened when the railway was extended to there from Windsor. It was a terminus until 21 December 1861, when the line was further extended to Brighton Beach.

In 1956, the station was closed to goods services. In 1959, a crossover at the station was abolished. In 1963, boom barriers replaced interlocked gates at the Bay Street level crossing, located at the down end of the station, and the signal box was abolished at the same time.

On 4 May 2010, as part of the 2010/2011 State Budget, $83.7 million was allocated to upgrade North Brighton to a premium station, along with nineteen others. However, in March 2011, that decision was reversed by the Baillieu Government.

== Platforms and services ==
North Brighton has two side platforms and is served by Sandringham line trains.

North Brighton platform arrangement
Platform	Line	Destination	Via	Service Type	Notes	Source
1	Sandringham line	Laverton, Werribee or Williamstown	Flinders Street	All stations	Services to Laverton and Williamstown only operate on weekdays.	
2	Sandringham line	Sandringham		All stations		

== Transport links ==
CDC Melbourne operates one bus route via North Brighton station, under contract to Public Transport Victoria:

- 626 : Middle Brighton station – Chadstone Shopping Centre

Kinetic Melbourne operates one route via North Brighton station, under contract to Public Transport Victoria:

- 922 : Westfield Southland – St Kilda station

Ventura Bus Lines operates two routes via North Brighton station, under contract to Public Transport Victoria:

- SmartBus 703 : Middle Brighton station – Blackburn station
- 823 : to Westfield Southland

SkyBus also operates a service to Melbourne Airport via North Brighton station.
