= Ripponlea railway station =

Railway station in Melbourne, Australia

Ripponlea
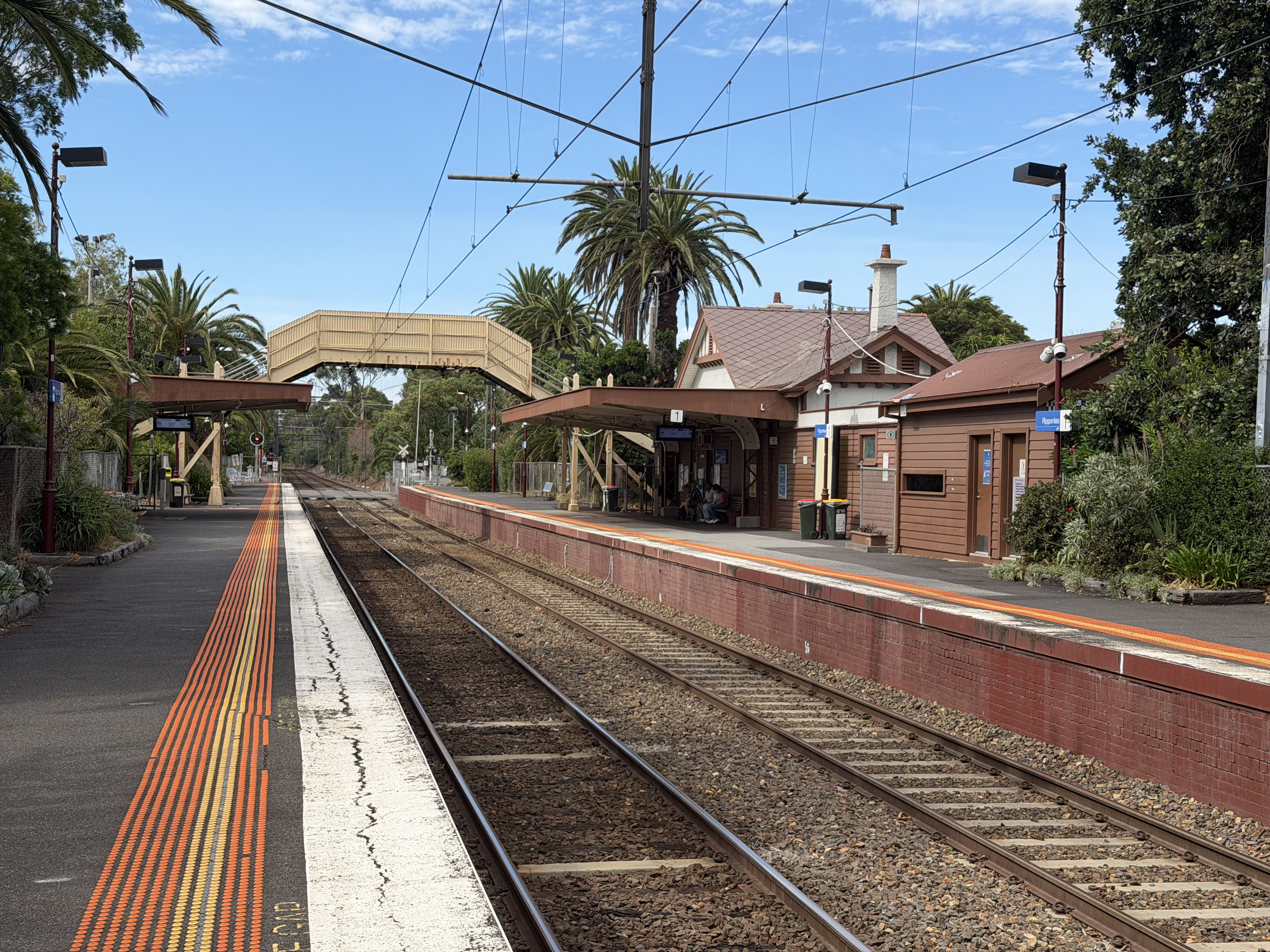
- South-east bound view from Platform 2, February 2026

General information
- Location: Glen Eira Road, Ripponlea, Victoria 3185; City of Port Phillip; Australia
- Coordinates: 37°52′33″S 144°59′42″E
- System: PTV commuter rail station
- Owner: VicTrack
- Operator: Metro Trains
- Line: Sandringham
- Distance: 9.83 kilometres from Southern Cross
- Platforms: 2 side
- Tracks: 2
- Connections: Tram; Bus

Construction
- Structure type: Ground
- Cycle facilities: Yes
- Accessible: Yes—step free access

Other information
- Status: Operational, host station
- Station code: RIP
- Fare zone: Myki zone 1
- Website: Public Transport Victoria

History
- Opened: 1 May 1912; 114 years ago
- Electrified: 1500 V DC overhead (28 May 1919)

Passengers
- 2005–2006: 544,171
- 2006–2007: 582,849 ▲7.1%
- 2007–2008: 614,903 ▲5.49%
- 2008–2009: 675,480 ▲9.85%
- 2009–2010: 718,704 ▲6.39%
- 2010–2011: 708,724 ▼1.38%
- 2011–2012: 659,004 ▼7.01%
- 2012–2013: Not measured
- 2013–2014: 727,060 ▲10.32%
- 2014–2015: 714,429 ▼1.73%
- 2015–2016: 788,960 ▲10.43%
- 2016–2017: 748,125 ▼5.17%
- 2017–2018: 747,752 ▼0.04%
- 2018–2019: 656,564 ▼12.19%
- 2019–2020: 531,200 ▼19.09%
- 2020–2021: 244,200 ▼54.02%
- 2021–2022: 276,600 ▲13.26%

Services
Preceding station	Metro Trains	Following station
Balaclava towards Laverton, Werribee or Williamstown via Flinders Street	Sandringham line	Elsternwick towards Sandringham
Track layout
Location

Ripponlea station is a railway station operated by Metro Trains Melbourne on the Sandringham line, part of the Melbourne rail network. It serves the suburb of Ripponlea in Melbourne, Victoria, Australia.

Opened on 1 May 1912, the station complex is listed on the Victorian Heritage Register. The station is named after, and serves, the south-eastern suburb of Ripponlea. Ripponlea station is a ground level host station, featuring two side platforms. The railway station is accessible, with step free access provided.

The station connects to services on tram route 67 and bus route 623. The journey to Southern Cross railway station is approximately 9.83 kilometres (6.11 mi) and takes 12 minutes.

== Description ==
Ripponlea station is located in Ripponlea, a suburb of Melbourne, Victoria. It is owned by the state government agency VicTrack and operated by Metro Trains Melbourne. The station is approximately 9.83 kilometres (6.11 mi), or a 12-minute journey, away from Southern Cross station. Its adjacent stations are Balaclava station up towards Melbourne and Elsternwick station down towards Sandringham.

The station consists of two side platforms for a total of two platform edges. Platform 1 has a large timber building, with a smaller timber building on Platform 2. Both buildings are cladded with weatherboard. The platforms also have cantilevered verandahs. There is a timber footbridge immediately south of the station buildings, which connects the two platforms and allows pedestrians to cross the railway tracks.

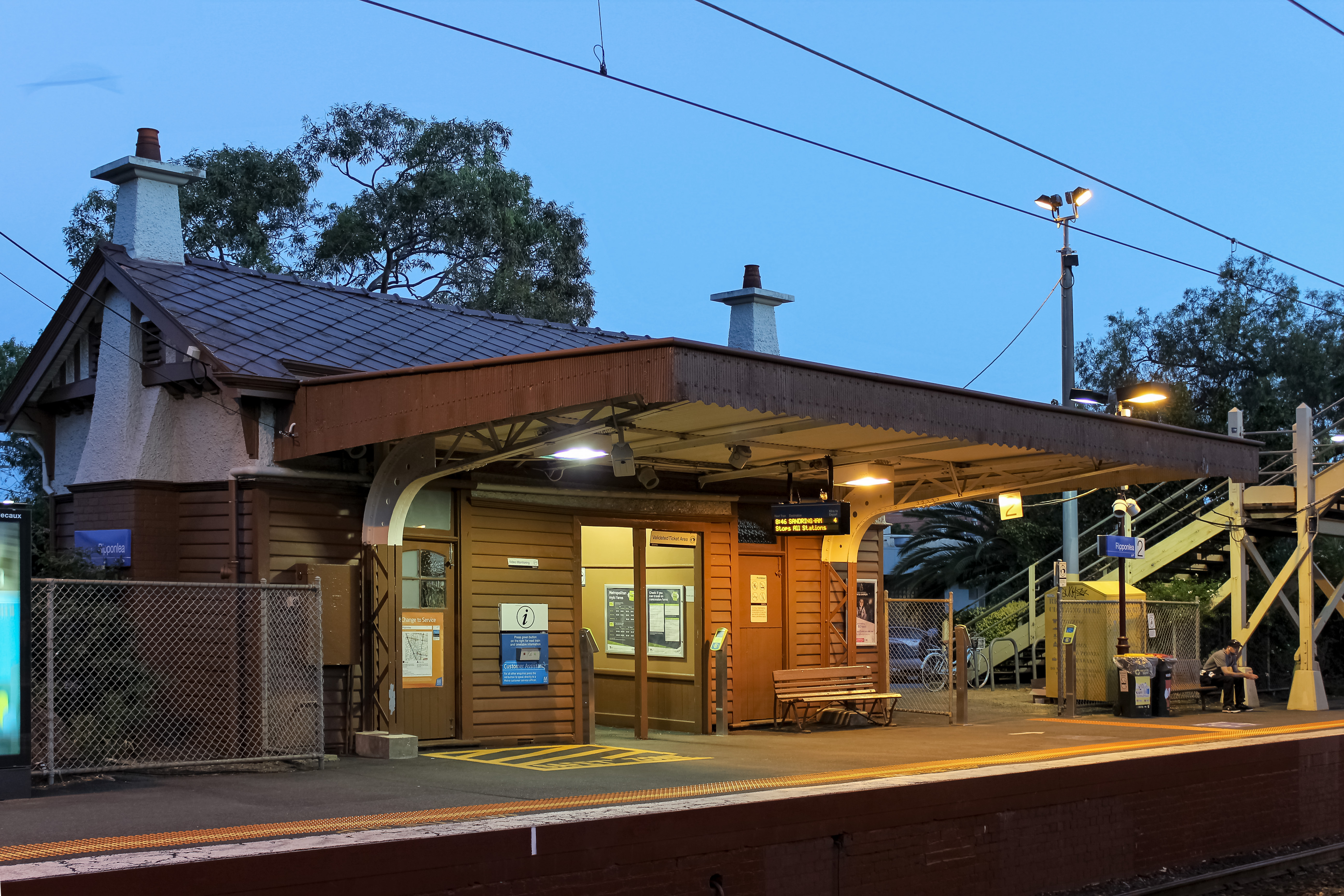
Heritage station building on Platform 1, December 2017

The station is largely the same as when it was built, as minimal changes were made to the complex. There is no car parking available at the station. Ripponlea station is accessible and compliant with the Disability Discrimination Act 1992, as step free access is provided. It is a host station, which means that it is staffed only during the morning peak.

== History ==
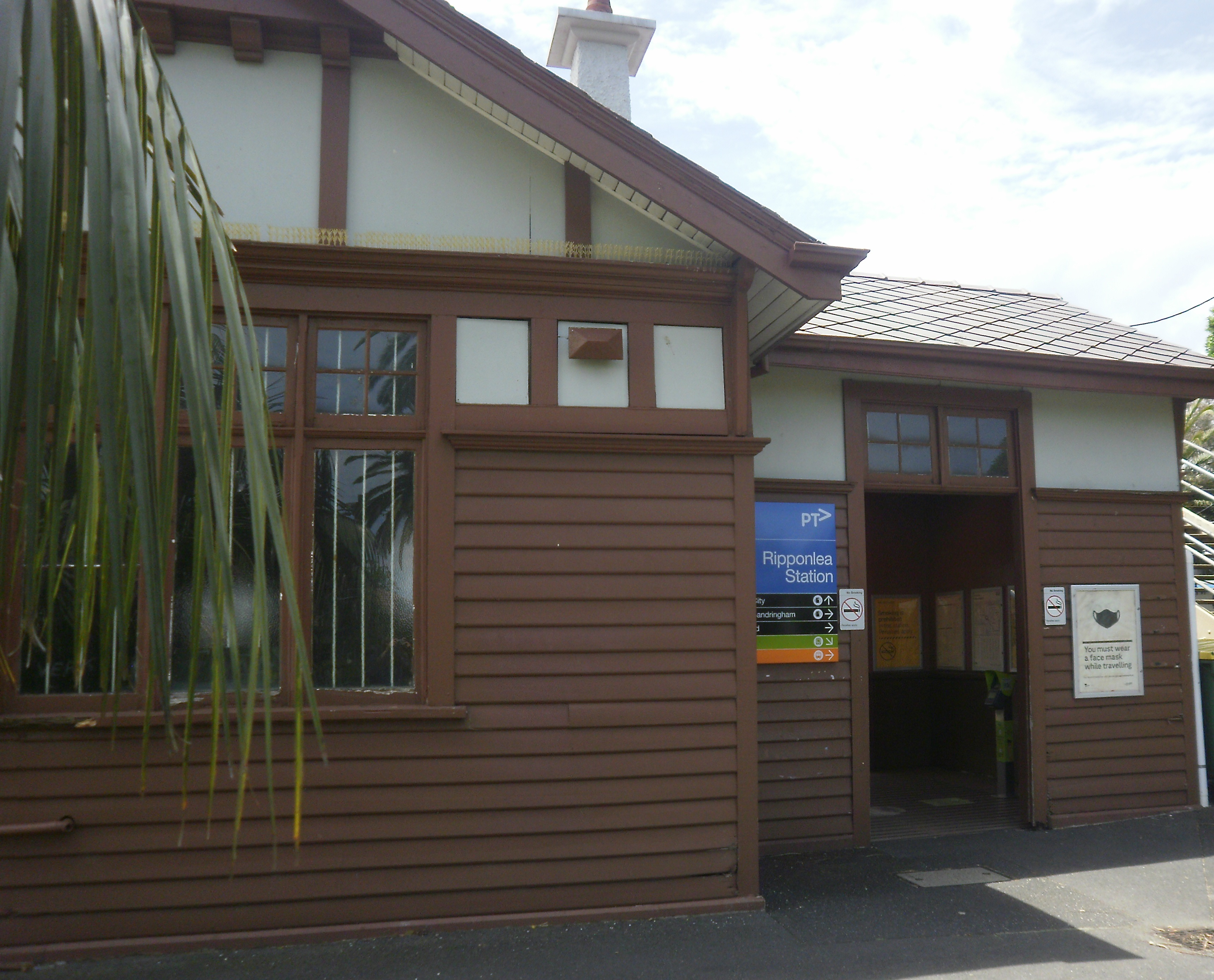
Entrance to Platform 1 and heritage station building, November 2021

A railway station at Glen Eira Road was proposed in 1904, which would become Ripponlea station. Ripponlea station opened on 1 May 1912 on the then-Brighton line between Balaclava and Elsternwick stations. Like the suburb itself, it was named after the Rippon Lea Estate, which was formed by Frederick Thomas Sargood, businessman and a member of Parliament for the Victorian Legislative Council between 1874–1880 and 1882–1901, and a senator for Victoria between 1901 and 1903.

On 16 December 1917, three-position signalling was provided. Electrification to the station with 1500 V DC overhead wires was provided on 28 May 1919. In 1960, boom barriers replaced interlocked gates at the Glen Eira Road level crossing, with the signal box protecting the level crossing also abolished during that time. In 1980, all of the semaphore signals at Ripponlea were replaced with light signals. Pedestrian gates were provided at the Glen Eira Road level crossing in August 1992.

== Platforms and services ==
Ripponlea has two side platforms with two platform faces. It is served by Sandringham line trains. The Sandringham line runs from Flinders Street station to Sandringham station. As part of the opening of the Metro Tunnel, a reconfiguration of Melbourne's railway network is planned. This will involve Sandringham line services through-running with Werribee and Williamstown line services.

Ripponlea platform arrangement
Platform	Line	Destination	Via	Service Type	Notes	Source
1	Sandringham line	Laverton, Werribee or Williamstown	Flinders Street	All stations	Services to Laverton and Williamstown only operate on weekdays.	
2	Sandringham line	Sandringham		All stations		

== Transport links ==
Ripponlea station has one tram connection and one bus connection. Tram route 67, operated by Yarra Trams, runs from Melbourne University to Carnegie and is operated from Brighton Road. Bus route 623, operated by CDC Melbourne, runs from Glen Waverley station to St Kilda and is operated from Glen Eira Road.

=== Trams ===
- : Melbourne University – Carnegie

=== Buses ===
- 623 : Glen Waverley station – St Kilda
