= Middle Brighton railway station =

Heritage-listed railway station in Melbourne, Victoria, Australia

Middle Brighton
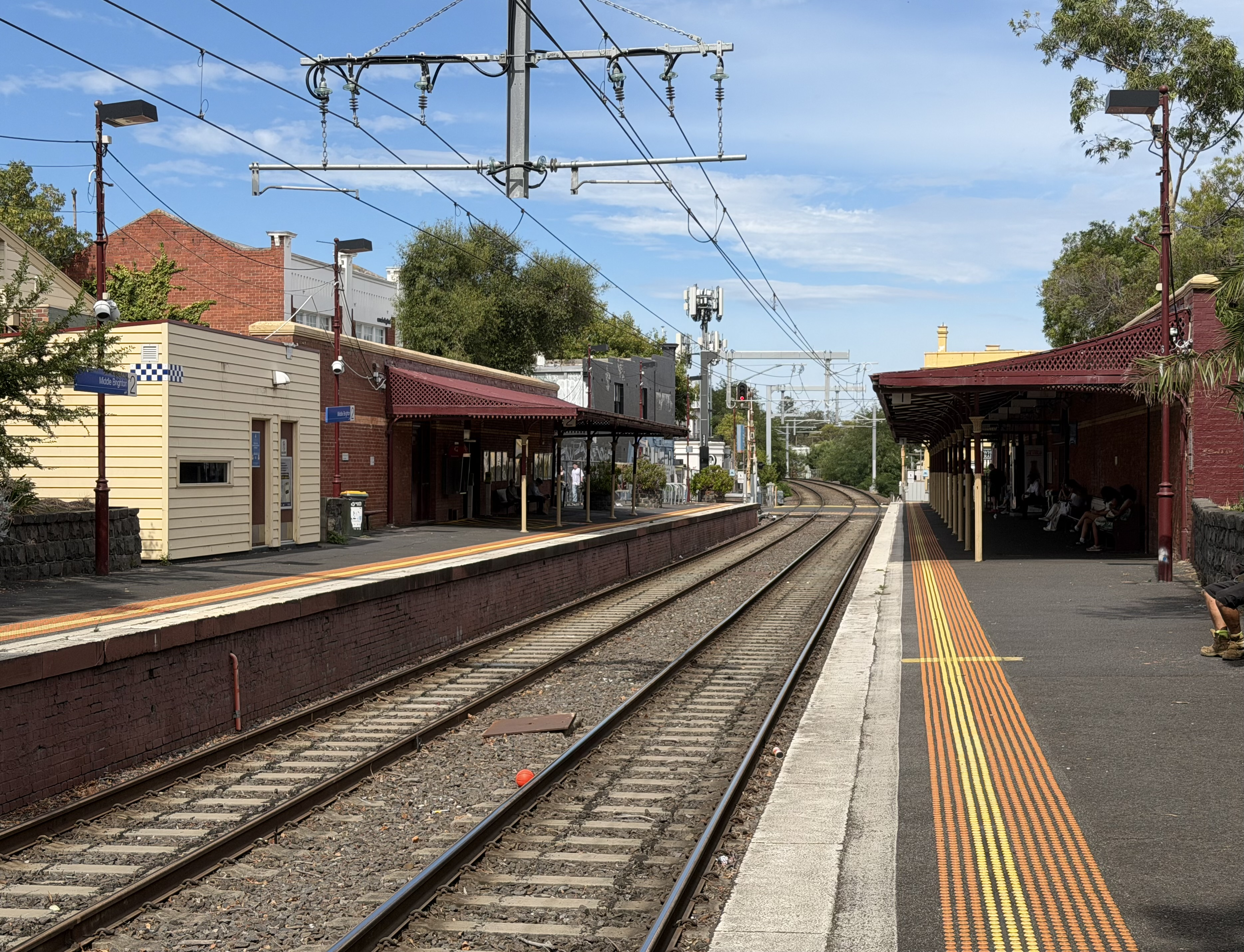
- South-west bound view from Platform 1, February 2026

General information
- Location: Railway Walk, Brighton, Victoria 3186; City of Bayside; Australia
- Coordinates: 37°54′54″S 144°59′47″E
- System: PTV commuter rail station
- Owner: VicTrack
- Operator: Metro Trains
- Line: Sandringham
- Distance: 14.52 kilometres from Southern Cross
- Platforms: 2 side
- Tracks: 2
- Connections: Bus

Construction
- Structure type: Ground
- Parking: 107
- Accessible: Yes—step free access

Other information
- Status: Operational, host station
- Station code: MBN
- Fare zone: Myki zone 1/2
- Website: Public Transport Victoria

History
- Opened: 21 December 1861; 164 years ago
- Electrified: May 1919 (1500 V DC overhead)
- Former names: Church Street (1861–1867)

Passengers
- 2005–2006: 428,644
- 2006–2007: 471,138 ▲9.91%
- 2007–2008: 496,039 ▲5.28%
- 2008–2009: 513,660 ▲3.55%
- 2009–2010: 551,298 ▲7.32%
- 2010–2011: 559,347 ▲1.46%
- 2011–2012: 539,918 ▼3.47%
- 2012–2013: Not measured
- 2013–2014: 661,807 ▲22.57%
- 2014–2015: 665,701 ▲0.58%
- 2015–2016: 745,840 ▲12.03%
- 2016–2017: 731,116 ▼1.97%
- 2017–2018: 715,998 ▼2.06%
- 2018–2019: 682,443 ▼4.68%
- 2019–2020: 567,700 ▼16.81%
- 2020–2021: 243,050 ▼57.18%
- 2021–2022: 292,700 ▲20.42%

Services
Preceding station	Metro Trains	Following station
North Brighton towards Laverton, Werribee or Williamstown via Flinders Street	Sandringham line	Brighton Beach towards Sandringham
- Building details

General information
- Architectural style: Victorian Free Classical
- Year built: 1882–1887

Technical details
- Material: Bluestone; bi-chromatic bricks; slate; cast iron

Design and construction
- Main contractor: R. & J. Shimmin (1882); A. Ringholm (1887)

Victorian Heritage Register
- Official name: Middle Brighton Railway Station Complex
- Type: Registered place
- Designated: 17 June 1999
- Reference no.: H1561
- Heritage overlay no.: HO107
- Category: Transport - Rail
Track layout
Location

The Middle Brighton station is a railway station operated by Metro Trains Melbourne on the Sandringham line, which is part of the Melbourne rail network. It serves the south-eastern suburb of Brighton, in Melbourne, Victoria, Australia. Middle Brighton station is a ground level host station, featuring two side platforms. It opened on 21 December 1861.

Initially opened as Church Street, the station was given its current name of Middle Brighton on 1 January 1867. The station complex was added to the Victorian Heritage Register on 17 June 1999 in recognition of its social, historical, aesthetic, and architectural importance. The footbridge at the station complex was also added to a non-statutory list by the Victorian branch of the National Trust on 15 April 1992.

== History ==
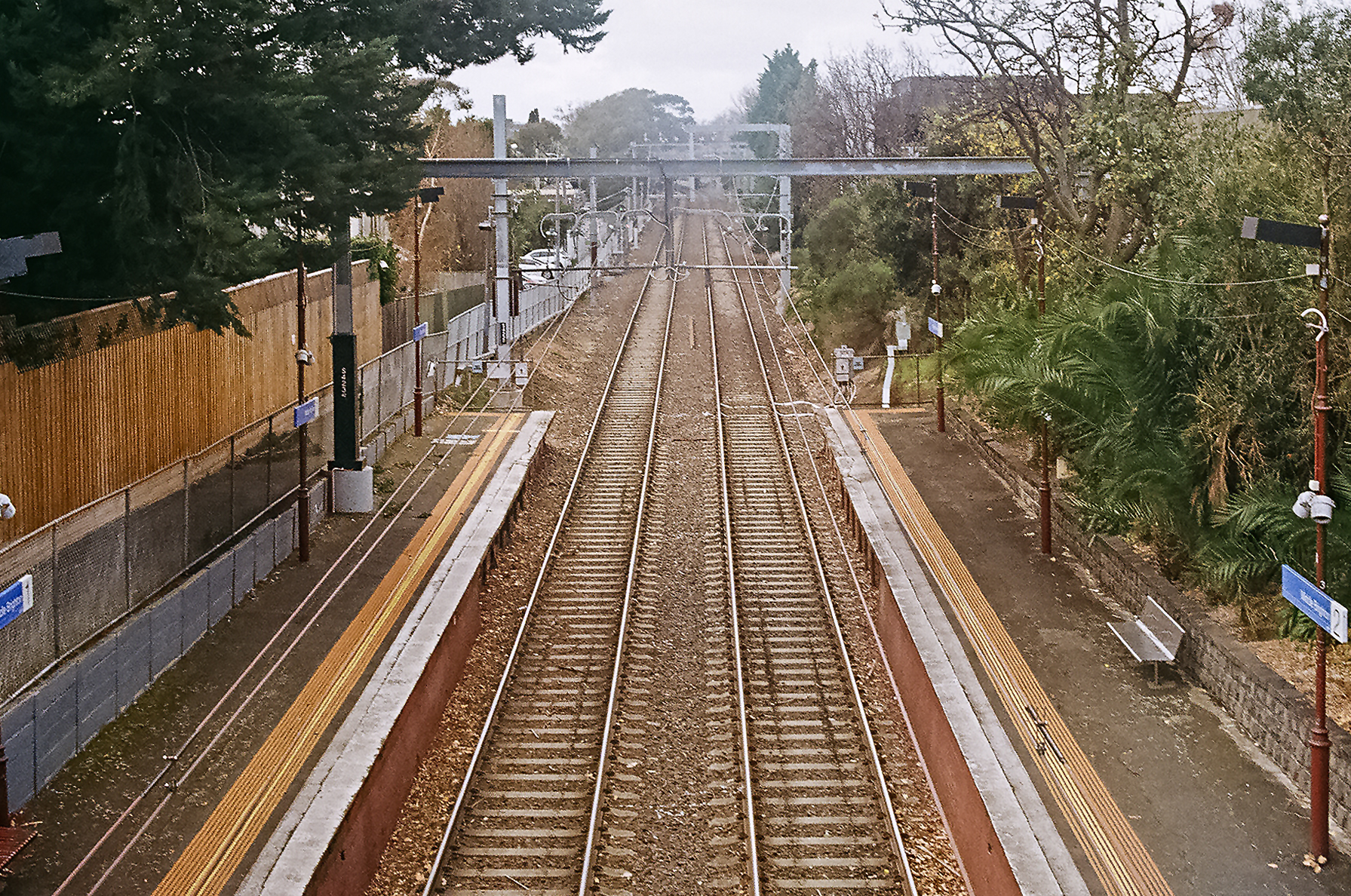
Northbound view of both of the station platforms, August 2025

The Middle Brighton station opened on 21 December 1861, when the railway line from North Brighton was extended to Brighton Beach. The Sandringham line was reconstructed after the government acquired it from the Melbourne and Hobson's Bay Railway Company in 1878. The station buildings on the Sandringham line were built for the Victorian Railways during the period 1882-1895. The Middle Brighton Railway Station was constructed in two stages with the upside building constructed in 1882 by the contractors R. & J. Shimmin and the down-side building constructed in 1887 by A. Ringholm.

In 1926, a crossover located between both platforms was abolished. In 1942, a siding was removed. In 1963, boom barriers replaced interlocked gates at the Church Street level crossing, located at the down end of the station. The signal box that protected the level crossing was also abolished during this time.

On 27 November 2024, a tree fell onto the overhead wires at the station as a result of a strong storm with strong winds. Due to this incident, buses were called to replace on the Sandringham Line for the rest of the day.

== Building description ==
The two station buildings are constructed of bi-chromatic brick in a Victorian Free Classical design, with bluestone platform walls and copings to the upside only. The upside building has a slate hipped roof with a later addition at south end and a concave verandah supported on cast iron columns. A long platform wall supports the verandah at the north end, which was probably extended to its current length in 1887 when the down-side building was constructed. The down-side building has a similar wall/verandah configuration with later timber extension to the north. Details common to both buildings include, arch openings, wrought iron lace work, fine wrought iron lattice panels in the verandah ends, and fluted cast iron columns.

== Platforms and services ==
Middle Brighton has two side platforms. It is serviced by Metro Trains' Sandringham line services.

On weekdays, two early morning services originate from Middle Brighton. These services are formed by empty trains directly from the stabling yard at Brighton Beach.

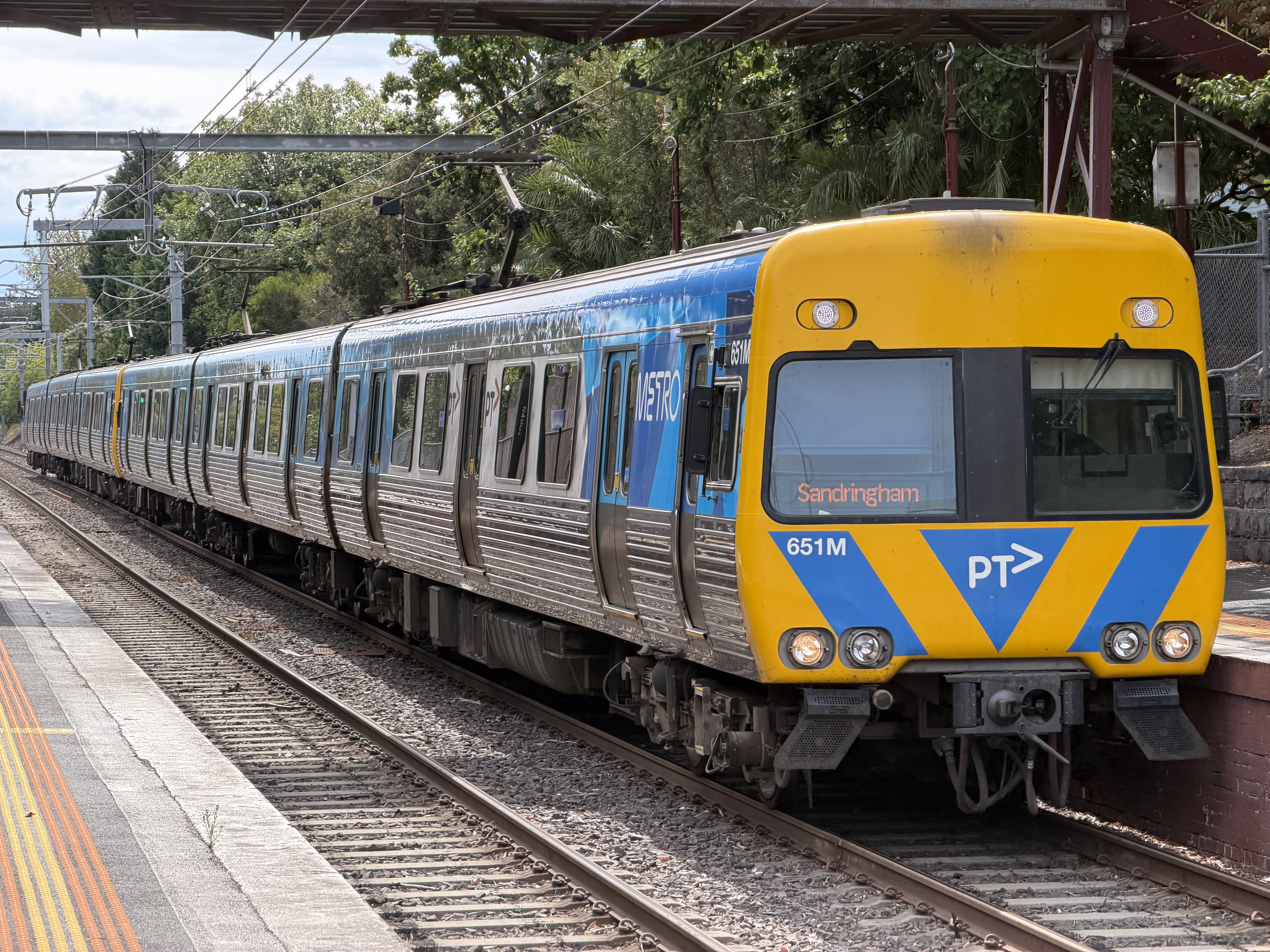
A Comeng train operating a service to Sandringham arrives at Platform 2, February 2026

Middle Brighton platform arrangement
Platform	Line	Destination	Via	Service Type	Notes	Source
1	Sandringham line	Laverton, Werribee or Williamstown	Flinders Street	All stations	Services to Laverton and Williamstown only operate on weekdays.	
2	Sandringham line	Sandringham		All stations		

== Transport links ==
CDC Melbourne operates one bus route to and from Middle Brighton station, under contract to Public Transport Victoria:

- 626 : to Chadstone Shopping Centre

Kinetic Melbourne operates one route via Middle Brighton station, under contract to Public Transport Victoria:

- 922 : Westfield Southland – St Kilda station

Ventura Bus Lines operates three routes via Middle Brighton station, under contract to Public Transport Victoria:

- SmartBus 703 : to Blackburn station
- 811 : Dandenong station – Brighton
- 812 : Dandenong station – Brighton

== See also ==
- Architecture of Melbourne
- List of railway stations in Melbourne
- List of places on the Victorian Heritage Register in the City of Bayside
