= Sandringham line =

Passenger rail service in Melbourne, Australia

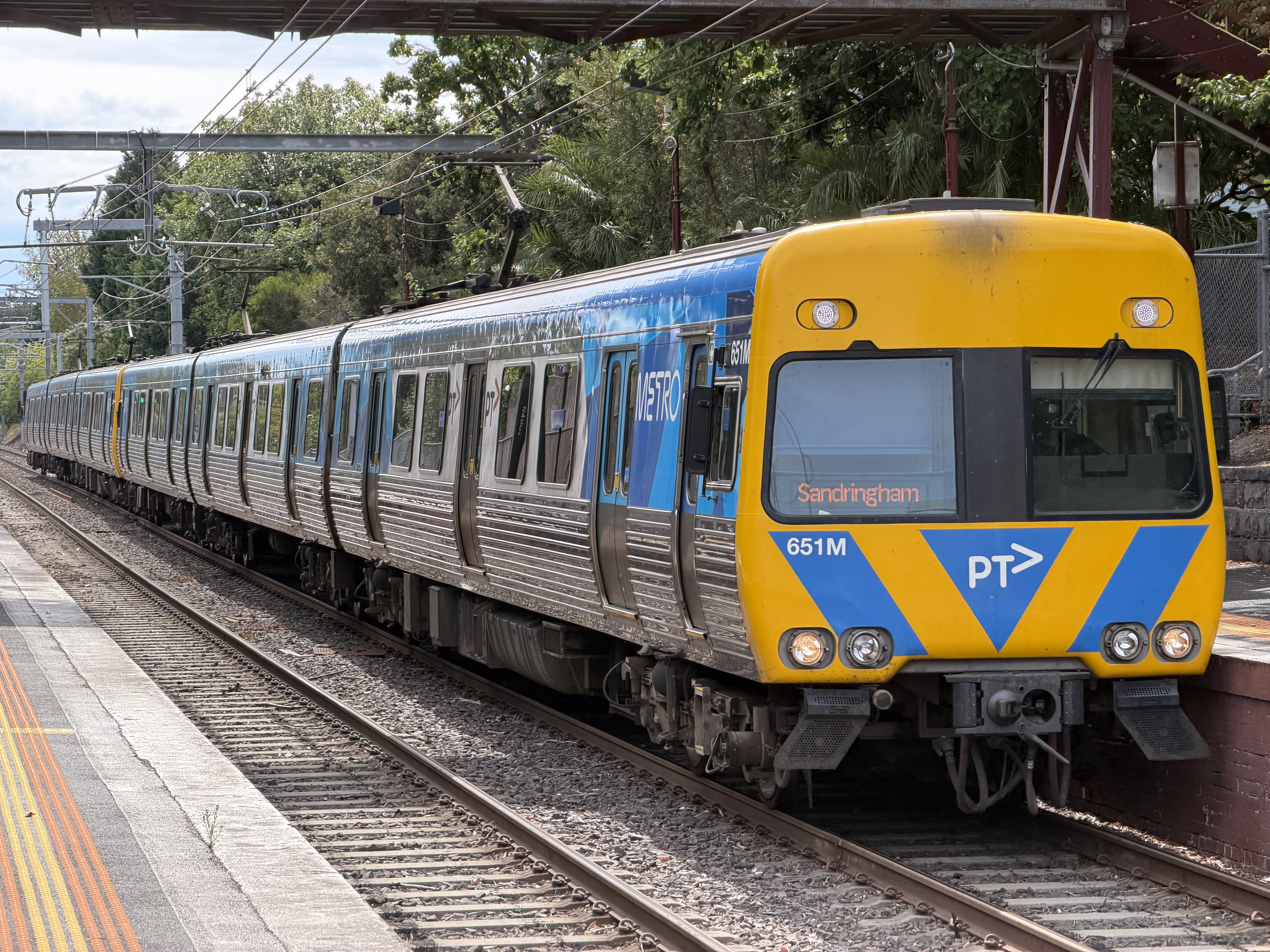
- An Alstom Comeng train operating a Sandringham service at Middle Brighton station, February 2026

Overview
- Service type: Commuter rail
- System: Melbourne railway network
- Status: Operational
- Locale: Melbourne, Australia
- Predecessor: Windsor – North Brighton (1859–1860); Princes Bridge – Cremorne (1859–1860); Princes Bridge – North Brighton (1860–1861); Brighton Beach (1861–1887)
- First service: 19 December 1859; 166 years ago
- Current operator: Metro Trains
- Former operators: St Kilda and Brighton Railway (1859–1862); Melbourne and Suburban Railway (1859–1862); Melbourne Railway Company (1862–1865); Melbourne and Hobson's Bay United Railway (1865–1878); Victorian Railways (VR) (1878–1974); VR as VicRail (1974–1983); MTA (The Met) (1983–1989); PTC (The Met) (1989–1998); Bayside Trains (1998–2000); M>Train (2000–2004); Connex Melbourne (2004–2009)

Route
- Termini: Flinders Street (most services continue to Werribee or Williamstown); Sandringham
- Stops: 14
- Distance travelled: 18.090 km (11.241 mi)
- Average journey time: 30 minutes
- Service frequency: 7-8 minutes weekdays peak; 10 minutes weekdays off-peak; 20 minutes weekday early mornings (before 6:30am) and nights (after 8pm); 20 minutes weekends; 40 minutes early Sunday morning (6am-8:30am outbound only); 60 minutes early weekend mornings
- Line used: Sandringham

Technical
- Rolling stock: Comeng, Siemens
- Track gauge: 1,600 mm (5 ft 3 in)
- Electrification: 1500 V DC overhead
- Track owner: VicTrack

The Sandringham line is a commuter railway line in the city of Melbourne, Australia. Operated by Metro Trains Melbourne, it is the city's fourth shortest metropolitan railway line at 17.9 kilometres (11.1 mi). The line runs from Flinders Street station in central Melbourne to Sandringham station in the south-east, serving 14 stations via South Yarra, Balaclava, Elsternwick, and Brighton. It operates from approximately 5am to 12am, daily, with 24 hour service available on Friday and Saturday nights. Trains on the Sandringham line run as six car formations, composed of two three-car sets of Comeng or Siemens Nexas trainsets. Since 23 August 2026, the line is through routed with the Werribee line, and is also through routed with the Williamstown line on weekdays only.

Sections of the Sandringham line opened as early as 1859, with the line fully extended to Sandringham in 1887. A limited number of stations were operational when the line first opened, with infill stations progressively constructed between 1860 and 1912. The line was built to connect Melbourne with the suburbs of Balaclava, Elsternwick, Brighton, and Sandringham, amongst others. Minor upgrades have occurred since its opening, including historical level crossing removal works and regular infrastructure upgrades.

== History ==
=== 19th century ===
The Melbourne and Suburban Railway Company opened their line from Princes Bridge (later amalgamated with Flinders Street station) to a temporary station on Punt Road in February 1859, then to Cremorne (now closed) in December of that year. Shortly after, the St Kilda and Brighton Railway Company opened their railway line from St Kilda to Bay Street (now North Brighton) in December 1859. Twelve months after that, the Melbourne and Suburban Railway Company extended their line from Cremorne to Chapel Street (now Windsor) station, on the St Kilda and Brighton Railway Company's line, providing a second route to the city from the Brighton line. The following year, again in December, the St Kilda and Brighton Railway Company extended their line to Beach (now Brighton Beach).

The link between St Kilda and Windsor, disused since 1862, was dismantled in 1867, although part of it at the Windsor end was used as a siding for some time afterwards. In 1865, the Melbourne and Hobson's Bay Railway Company, who owned the St Kilda line, purchased the Melbourne Suburban Railway Company and became the Melbourne and Hobson's Bay United Railway Company, and subsequently bought the St Kilda and Brighton Railway Company, which was in financial difficulties, for £99,500. The Victorian Government acquired the United railway company in July 1878.

In September 1887, the Brighton line was extended to Sandringham.

=== 20th century ===
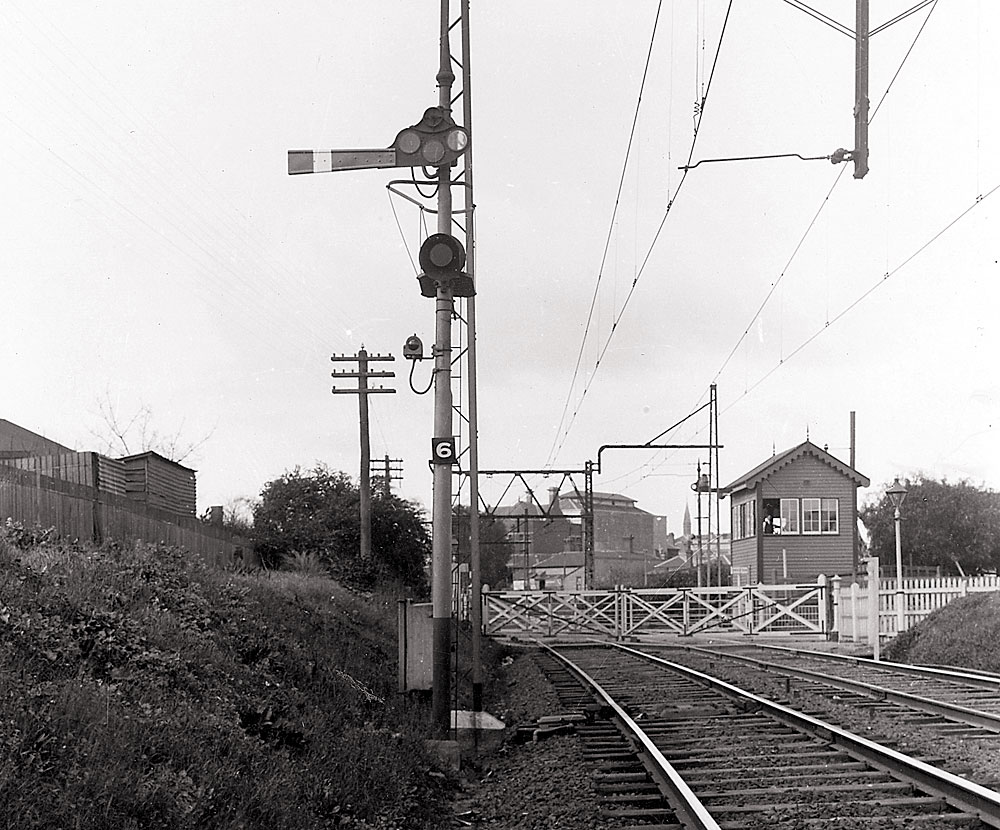
The new signalling system present at Windsor station, 1918

The Sandringham line became the first line in the state of Victoria to be provided with automatic signals, with the line as far as Elsternwick converted in stages from 1915 to 1918. Then in 1919, the Sandringham line became, with the line to Essendon, the first line in the country to be electrified (apart from a test installation on the Flemington Racecourse line). Automatic signalling was provided the rest of the way to Sandringham in two stages in during 1926.

When the underground City Loop line was designed, it was not intended to cater for trains on the Port Melbourne, St Kilda, and Sandringham lines. However, a crossover was installed near Richmond to allow Sandringham trains to cross to the tracks used by the Frankston, Pakenham, and Cranbourne line trains, which had access to the underground loop. In 1985, two Sandringham trains each way were altered to run via the underground loop, and in 1987, with the Port Melbourne and St Kilda lines converted to light rail operation, all off-peak and many peak trains were routed via the underground loop. The commencement of operations involved the service stopping at three new stations—Parliament, Melbourne Central (formally Museum), and Flagstaff. The Loop follows La Trobe and Spring Streets along the northern and eastern edges of the Hoddle Grid. The Loop connects with Melbourne's two busiest stations, Flinders Street and Southern Cross, via the elevated Flinders Street Viaduct. This would be until 1996 when timetable changes saw the Sandringham line taken out of the City Loop on weekdays and instead began running direct to and from Flinders Street. All weekend services still ran via the loop at this time.

=== 21st century ===
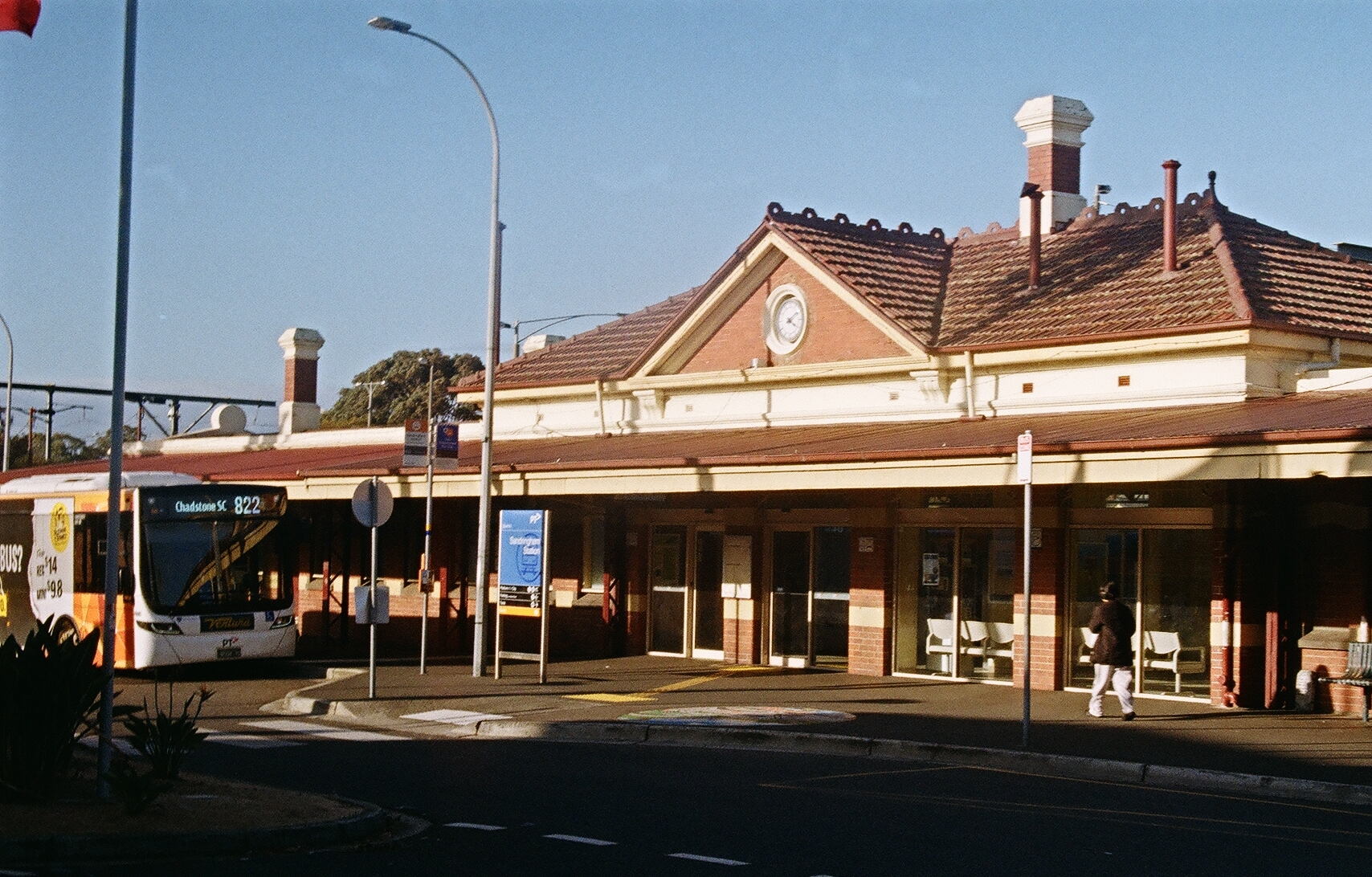
Sandringham station in August 2025

In 2021, the metropolitan timetable underwent a major rewrite, resulting in all Sandringham line trains terminating at Flinders Street without operating through the City Loop.

Starting from 23 August 2026, the Sandringham line received a new and upgraded timetable which saw service frequencies upgraded to every 10 minutes on weekdays with services altered to run through to Werribee and Williamstown lines from Flinders Street.

== Network and operations ==
=== Services ===
Services on the Sandringham line operates from approximately 5:00am to 12:00am (midnight) daily and all night on Friday and Saturday nights. Services run every 7–8 minutes during peak hour, with services running every 10 minutes during the inter-peak period on weekdays, and every 20 minutes at night and during the day on weekends (with the exception of early Sunday mornings between 6:00am and 8:30am when outbound services run every 40 minutes). Additionally, services run every 60 minutes overnight on Friday and Saturday nights as part of the Night Network.

Almost all services on the Sandringham line through run with the Werribee line daily and with the Williamstown line on weekdays only. Some outbound services begin at Flinders Street, such as two Friday and Saturday overnight services per day and two early morning services per weekday, while one early morning inbound service terminates at Flinders Street per weekday.

==== Stopping patterns ====
Legend — Station status

- ◼ Premium Station – Station staffed from first to last train
- ◻ Host Station – Usually staffed during morning peak, however this can vary for different stations on the network.

Legend — Stopping patterns
Services do not operate via the City Loop

- ● – All trains stop
- ◐ – Some services do not stop
- ▲ – Only inbound trains stop
- | – Trains pass and do not stop

Services continue beyond Flinders Street to Werribee or Williamstown.

Sandringham Services
Station	Zone	Local	Middle Brighton
◼ Flinders Street	1	●	▲
◼ Richmond	1	●	▲
◼ South Yarra	1	●	▲
◻ Prahran	1	●	▲
◻ Windsor	1	●	▲
◼ Balaclava	1	●	▲
◻ Ripponlea	1	●	▲
◼ Elsternwick	1	●	▲
Gardenvale	1	●	▲
◻ North Brighton	1/2	●	▲
◻ Middle Brighton	1/2	●	▲
◼ Brighton Beach	1/2	●	
Hampton	2	●	
◼ Sandringham	2	●	

=== Operators ===
The Sandringham line has had a total of 11 operators since its opening in 1859. The line was initially operated by the Melbourne and Suburban Railway Company, the St Kilda and Brighton Railway Company, the Melbourne Railway Company, and the Melbourne and Hobson's Bay Railway Company over the course of 19 years from 1859 till nationalisation in 1878. The majority of operations throughout its history have been government run: from 1878 until the 1999 privatisation of Melbourne's rail network, four different government operators have run the line. These operators, Victorian Railways, the Metropolitan Transit Authority, the Public Transport Corporation and Bayside Trains have a combined operational length of 121 years.

Bayside Trains was privatised in August 1999 and later rebranded M>Train. In 2002, M>Train was placed into receivership and the state government regained ownership of the line, with KPMG appointed as receivers to operate M>Train on behalf of the state government. Two years later, rival train operator Connex Melbourne took over the M>Train operations including the Sandringham line. Metro Trains Melbourne, the current private operator, then took over the operations in 2009. These private operators have had a combined operational period of 27 years.

Past and present operators of the Sandringham line:
Operator	Assumed operations	Ceased operations	Length of operations
Melbourne and Suburban Railway Company*	1859	1862	3 years
St Kilda and Brighton Railway Company*	1859	1862	3 years
Melbourne Railway Company	1862	1865	3 years
Melbourne and Hobson's Bay Railway Company	1865	1878	13 years
Victorian Railways	1878	1983	105 years
Metropolitan Transit Authority	1983	1989	6 years
Public Transport Corporation	1989	1998	9 years
Bayside Trains (government operator)	1998	1999	1 years
M>Train	1999	2004	5 years
Connex Melbourne	2004	2009	5 years
Metro Trains Melbourne	2009	incumbent	16 years (ongoing)

*Operated part of the route

=== Route ===
Interactive map of the Sandringham line in south-eastern Melbourne.

Sandringham (physical track)

Overview
- Status: Operational with passenger services from Flinders Street to Sandringham
- Owner: St Kilda and Brighton Railway (1859–1865); Melbourne and Suburban Railway (1859–1862); Melbourne Railway Company (1862–1865); Melbourne and Hobson's Bay United Railway (1865–1878); Victorian Railways (VR) (1878–1974); VR as VicRail (1974–1983); MTA (The Met) (1983–1989); PTC (The Met) (1989–1997); VicTrack (1997–Current)
- Locale: Melbourne, Victoria, Australia
- Termini: Flinders Street; Sandringham
- Connecting lines: All metropolitan and Bairnsdale/Traralgon
- Stations: 14 current stations; 2 former stations

Service
- Services: Sandringham

History
- Work began: 19 December 1859
- Opened: Princes Bridge to Richmond on 8 February 1859; Richmond to Cremorne on 12 December 1859; Windsor to North Brighton on 19 December 1859; Cremorne to Windsor on 22 December 1860; Flinders Street to Princes Bridge on 18 December 1865; North Brighton to Brighton Beach on 21 December 1861; Brighton Beach to Sandringham on 2 September 1887
- Completed: 2 September 1887
- Electrified: 28 May 1919

Technical
- Line length: 18.090 km (11.241 mi)
- Num of tracks: Twelve tracks: Flinders Street to Richmond; Six tracks: Richmond to South Yarra; Double track: South Yarra to Sandringham
- Track gauge: 1,600 mm (5 ft 3 in)
- Electrification: 1500 V DC overhead
- Operating speed: 70 km/h (43 mph)
- Signalling: Automatic block signalling
- Maximum incline: 1 in 93 (1.08%)

The Sandringham line forms a somewhat linear route with minor curves from the Melbourne central business district to its terminus in Sandringham. The route is 17.9 kilometres (11.1 mi) long and is predominantly doubled tracked, however between Flinders Street station and Richmond, the track is widened to 12 tracks, narrowing to 6 tracks between Richmond and South Yarra before again narrowing to 2 tracks between South Yarra and Sandringham. After departing from its terminus at Flinders Street, the Sandringham line traverses mainly flat country with few curves and fairly minimal earthworks for most of the line. However, sections of the line have been elevated or lowering into a cutting to eliminate level crossings. Despite historical removals, there are numerous level crossings still present on the line with no current plans to remove them.

The line follows the same alignment as the Cranbourne, Pakenham, and Frankston lines with the four services splitting onto different routes at South Yarra. The Sandringham line continues on its south eastern alignment, whereas the Cranbourne, Pakenham, and Frankston lines takes an eastern alignment towards their final destinations. From Balaclava, the line is never more than ~2 kilometres (1.2 mi) from the eastern shore of Port Phillip. All of the rail line goes through built-up suburbs towards its terminus in Sandringham.

=== Stations ===
The line serves 14 stations across 17.9 kilometres (11.1 mi) of track. The stations are a mix of elevated, lowered, and ground level designs. The majority of stations are at ground level, with elevated or lowered stations constructed in conjunction with historical level crossing removals works.

Station	Image	Accessibility	Opened	Terrain	Train connections	Other connections
Flinders Street		Yes—step free access	1854	Lowered	13 connections: * Alamein line; Belgrave line; Craigieburn line; Flemington Racecourse line; Frankston line; Gippsland line; Glen Waverley line; Hurstbridge line; Lilydale line; Mernda line; Upfield line; Werribee line; Williamstown line	Trams Buses
Richmond		No—steep ramp	1859	Elevated	6 connections: * Alamein line; Belgrave line; Frankston line; Gippsland line; Glen Waverley line; Lilydale line	Trams Buses
South Yarra		No—steep ramp	1860	Lowered	1 connection: * Frankston line	Trams
Prahran		Yes—step free access	1860	Ground level		Trams
Windsor		No—steep ramp	1859	Ground level		Trams
Balaclava		Yes—step free access	1859	Elevated		Trams
Ripponlea		Yes—step free access	1912	Ground level		Trams Buses
Elsternwick		Yes—step free access	1859	Lowered		Trams Buses
Gardenvale		No—steep ramp	1906	Elevated		Buses
North Brighton		Yes—step free access	1859	Ground level		Buses
Middle Brighton		Yes—step free access	1861	Ground level		Buses
Brighton Beach		Yes—step free access	1861	Ground level		Buses
Hampton		Yes—step free access	1887	Ground level		Buses
Sandringham		Yes—step free access	1887	Ground level		Buses

Station Histories
Station	Opened	Closed	Age	Notes
Parliament	22 January 1983		43 years	Not a stop since 2021
Melbourne Central	26 January 1981		45 years	Formerly Museum; Not a stop since 2021
Flagstaff	27 May 1985		41 years	Not a stop since 2021
Southern Cross	17 January 1859		167 years	Formerly Batman's Hill; Formerly Spencer Street; Not a stop since 2021
Flinders Street	12 September 1854		172 years	Formerly Melbourne Terminus
Princes Bridge	8 February 1859	1 October 1866	7 years	
Princes Bridge	2 April 1879	30 June 1980	101 years	
Botanic Gardens	2 March 1859	c. April 1862	Approx. 3 years	
Punt Road	8 February 1859	12 December 1859	10 months	Replaced by Swan Street (200m further along line)
Richmond	12 December 1859		166 years	Formerly Swan Street
Cremorne	12 December 1859	c. 28 December 1863	Approx. 4 years	
South Yarra	22 December 1860		165 years	Formerly Gardiner's Creek Road
Prahran	22 December 1860		165 years	Formerly Greville Street
Windsor	19 December 1859		166 years	Formerly Chapel Street
Balaclava	19 December 1859		166 years	
Ripponlea	1 May 1912		114 years	
Elsternwick	19 December 1859		166 years	
Gardenvale	10 December 1906		119 years	
North Brighton	19 December 1859		166 years	Formerly Bay Street
Middle Brighton	21 December 1861		164 years	Formerly Church Street
Brighton Beach	21 December 1861		164 years	Formerly Beach
Hampton	2 September 1887		139 years	Formerly Hampton; Formerly Retreat
Sandringham	2 September 1887		139 years	

== Infrastructure ==
=== Rolling stock ===
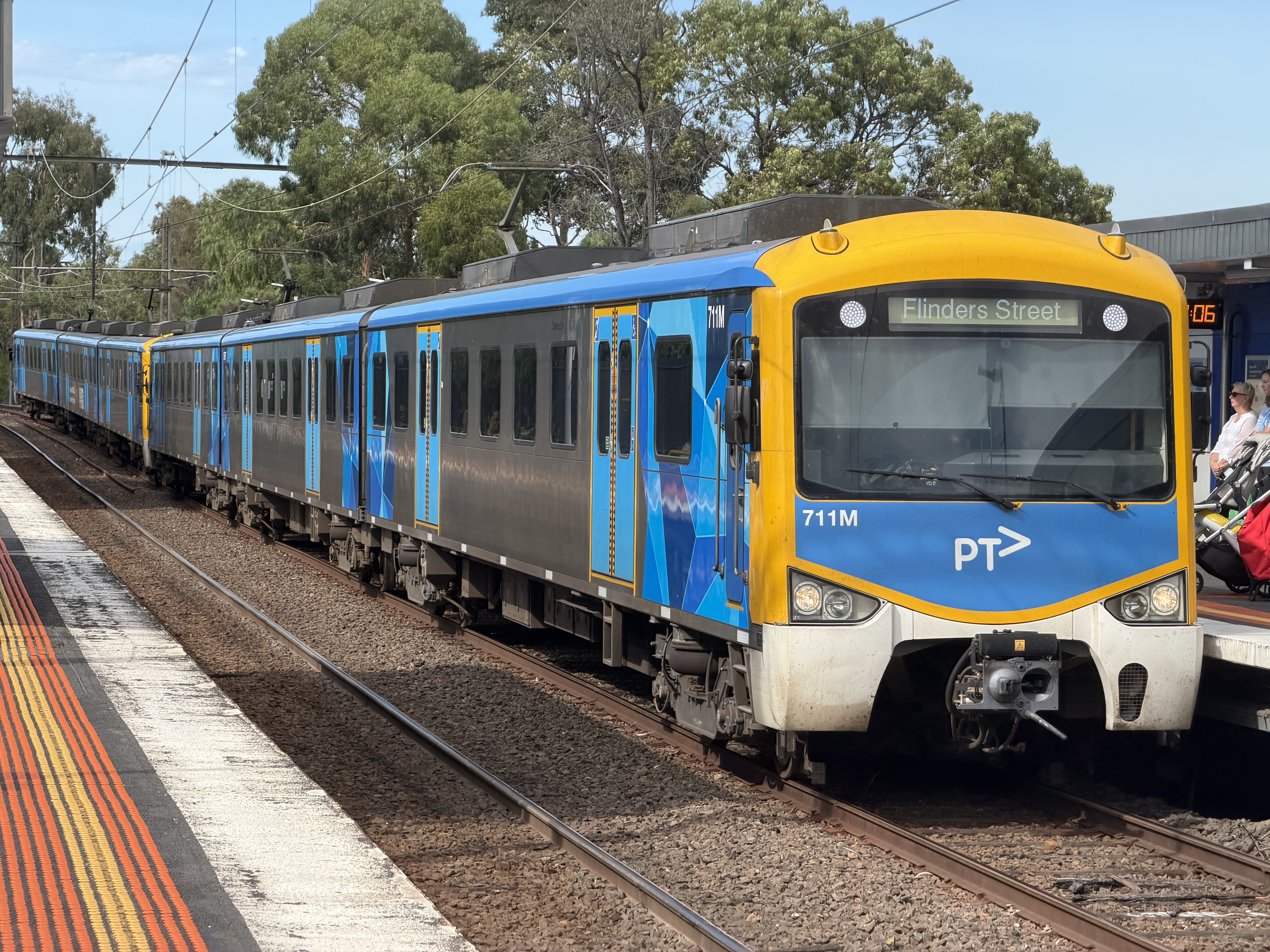
Siemens Nexas trains are widely used across the Sandringham line.

The Sandringham line uses two different types of electric multiple unit (EMU) trains that are operated in a split six-car configuration. The primary rolling stock featured on the line is the Comeng EMUs contain three doors per side on each carriage and can accommodate up to 556 seated passengers in each six-car configuration. These trains were originally built between 1981 and 1988 and were later refurbished by Alstom & EDi Rail between 2000 and 2003 and UGL Rail between 2017 and 2021. Since 2021, Comeng EMUs are progressively being retired as new rolling stock is introduced to the rail network. The second type of rolling stock is the Siemens Nexas EMUs contain two doors per side on each carriage and can accommodate up to 432 seated passengers in each six-car configuration. The trains were originally built between 2002 and 2005 with a total of 72 three-car sets constructed.

Alongside the passenger trains, Sandringham line tracks and equipment are maintained by a fleet of engineering trains. The four types of engineering trains are: the shunting train; designed for moving trains along non-electrified corridors and for transporting other maintenance locomotives, for track evaluation; designed for evaluating track and its condition, the overhead inspection train; designed for overhead wiring inspection, and the infrastructure evaluation carriage designed for general infrastructure evaluation. Most of these trains are repurposed locomotives previously used by V/Line, Metro Trains, and the Southern Shorthaul Railroad.

==== Former rolling stock ====
When the line was electrified, the Sandringham line initially used a fleet of Swing Door and Tait EMUs. Until the 2000s, the line generally used all types of EMUs operating in Melbourne.

From 1982, as the Comeng EMUs entered service, the remaining Tait stock were cascaded onto the Sandingham line, as well as on the Port Melbourne and St Kilda lines as they were banned from running in the City Loop. At the same time, the refurbished Harris trains were put into service on those said three lines. From 1991, the line went back to using the regular Hitachi and Comeng trains until its displacement with the Siemens EMU.

Hitachi EMUs were removed from the line in December 2013.

=== Accessibility ===
In compliance with the Disability Discrimination Act of 1992, all stations that are new-built or rebuilt are fully accessible and comply with these guidelines. The majority of stations on the corridor are fully accessible, however, there are some stations that haven't been upgraded to meet these guidelines. These stations do feature ramps, however, they have a gradient greater than 1 in 14. Stations that are fully accessible feature ramps that have a gradient less than 1 in 14, have at-grade paths, or feature lifts. These stations typically also feature tactile boarding indicators, independent boarding ramps, wheelchair accessible myki barriers, hearing loops, and widened paths.

Individual upgrade projects designed around improving station accessibility have occurred in recent years, with works making significant strides in improving network accessibility, with more than 71% of Sandringham line stations classed as fully accessible.

=== Signalling ===
The Sandringham line uses three position signalling which is widely used across the Melbourne train network. Three position signalling was first introduced in 1915, with the final section of the line converted to the new type of signalling in 1926. The Sandringham line was the first line in Victoria to be equipped with this technology and was also the first (along with part of the Craigieburn line) to have a regular electric service.
