= Medium 21 =

British rock band

- Origin: Northampton, England
- Genre: Alternative rock
- Years active: 1999–2004
- Labels: Outafocus (2000–2001); Fierce Panda (2001); Temptation Records (2002–2004)
- Past members: Jon Clough; Drew Kent; Paul Thornton; Craig Brown

Medium 21 were a rock band from Northampton, England. The group formed whilst studying at Northampton College in 1999.

== Band lineup ==
The band lineup was:

- Jon Clough (Vocals, Guitar)
- Craig Brown (Guitar, Vocals, Keyboard)
- Paul Thornton (Bass guitar)
- Drew Kent (Drums)

== History ==
Jon Clough, Drew Kent and Paul Thornton met whilst studying at Northampton College in 1999. The original three-piece were later joined by Craig Brown to add extra depth on guitars, keyboards and vocals. Medium 21 have released several one-off EPs. These have been on various labels including the independent Outafocus and Fierce Panda. It was Fierce Panda's sister label, Temptation records who signed the band after the success of Plans Are Not Enough EP.

The band have received airplay from BBC Radio 1 including a session for Steve Lamacq and Mark and Lard. They have also featured on London based radio station, XFM.

The debut album is produced by Tim Rowkins, who has worked with the band throughout the release of past material.

Members Jon Clough, Andrew Kent and Paul Thornton have formed another band Pictures Of Leonard with Gaz, formerly of Red Tiger Riot, and Luke, formerly of Kapowski and currently of The Parks Dept and Pets. Craig 'Arge' Brown has been recording (April 2009) his own project An Escape Plan.

== Artistic comparisons ==
Comparisons can be made to American indie lo-fi groups like The Flaming Lips and Mercury Rev. Also, the alternative retro syth sound of Grandaddy and pop beats and overtones of The Dandy Warhols.

The band have never been afraid to stretch the dynamic of the rock four piece. The album demonstrates this well with the use of xylophones, keyboards and other instruments.

== Discography ==
=== Album ===
Killings From the Dial (March 2003)	Temptation	1. The Plight Of Losing Out; 2. Junctions In Our Sleep; 3. Daybreak Vs Pride; 4. Poisoned Postcards; 5. The Wrong Road; 6. The Cable And The Cars (interlude: The Wax); 7. Catalyst R.U.N.; 8. By My Side; 9. Black And White Summer; 10. Acting Like A Mirror; 11. Albert Ross; 12. The Best Part; 13. We Were The Ones; Special Edition track 14. Leaving The Drills Behind

=== Singles ===
"Daybreak Vs Pride" (February 2003)	Temptation	1. Daybreak Vs Pride; 2. The Sound Of Empty Rooms; 3. Someone Turn This Place On
"By My Side" (June 2003)	Temptation	1. By My Side; 2. The Night Is Your Blade; 3. Passenger Seat

=== EPs ===
In Awe of Agriculture EP (December 2000)	Outafocus	1. Build A Stage, Burn It Down; 2. Gas Tank Romance; 3. Crisis 4.0; 4. Secret Hideaway
Riot on the Tyres EP (May 2001)	Outafocus	1. Cable And The Cars; 2. Archaic Form Of Love Persuasion; 3. Buy The Drills; 4. Trying To Lay Low; 5. Little Sandy's
Plans Aren't Enough EP (October 2001)	Fierce Panda	1. Plans Aren't Enough; 2. Dodging Flames; 3. By My Side
Acting Like A Mirror EP (November 2002)	Temptation	1. Acting Like A Mirror; 2. Honeymoon Hearse; 3. Theme From Studio 2; 4. Evil Dancer
