= Tick (disambiguation) =

A tick is a parasitic mite of the order Ixodida.

Tick or ticking may also refer to:

- Tick (check mark), a mark (✓, ✔, ☑, etc.) used to indicate 'yes', 'complete' or 'correct'
- Ticking (sound), a sharp and rhythmic sound particularly associated with mechanical clocks and watches
- Ticking (textile), cotton or linen textile tightly woven for durability
  - Tick mattress, a stuffed mattress made from ticking

== Arts and entertainment ==
- Tick (character), a spoof comicbook superhero created by Ben Edlund in 1986
  - The Tick (1994 TV series), an animated series on Fox
  - The Tick (2001 TV series), a live-action series on Fox
  - The Tick (2016 TV series), a 2016 series on Amazon Prime
  - The Tick (video game), a 1994 game based on the 1994 TV series
- Ticks (film), a 1993 direct-to-video horror film
- "Ticks" (song), a 2007 single by Brad Paisley
- "Ticking", a song by Elton John from Caribou
- "Tick", a song by Ween from GodWeenSatan: The Oneness

== Computing ==
- Tick, atomic unit, equivalent to 100 nanoseconds, used to define system time in computing
- Tick (software), a time tracking software
- Tick, a delay of 1/18 seconds in IPX routing (IPX Rip) used instead of hop counting
- Tick, a computer instruction cycle, which is, in some operating systems, a unit countable by software
- Backtick, by which the character ` is sometimes known in computing

== Other uses ==
- Commodity tick, a unit of measurement of price movement of a stock or other exchange traded asset
- Tick Segerblom (born 1948), an American attorney and politician
- "The Tick", the Magellan Project Science Team's nickname for the first scalloped margin dome found on Venus
- "Buying on tick", buying on credit
- Ticked, isolated regions of pigment in dog coat coloration patterns
- Ticked tabby, a coat pattern of tabby cat fur
- Tick (pejorative), a pejorative used in Germany
- Tick, a measurement of time equal to 1 fourth of 1 second

== See also ==
- Tic (disambiguation)
- Ticket (disambiguation)
- Tik (disambiguation)
- Tick tock (disambiguation)
- Tick fever (disambiguation)
- Ticking (disambiguation)
