= Railways in Melbourne =

Railway network in Melbourne, Victoria, Australia

Melbourne rail network
- Metropolitan train roundel

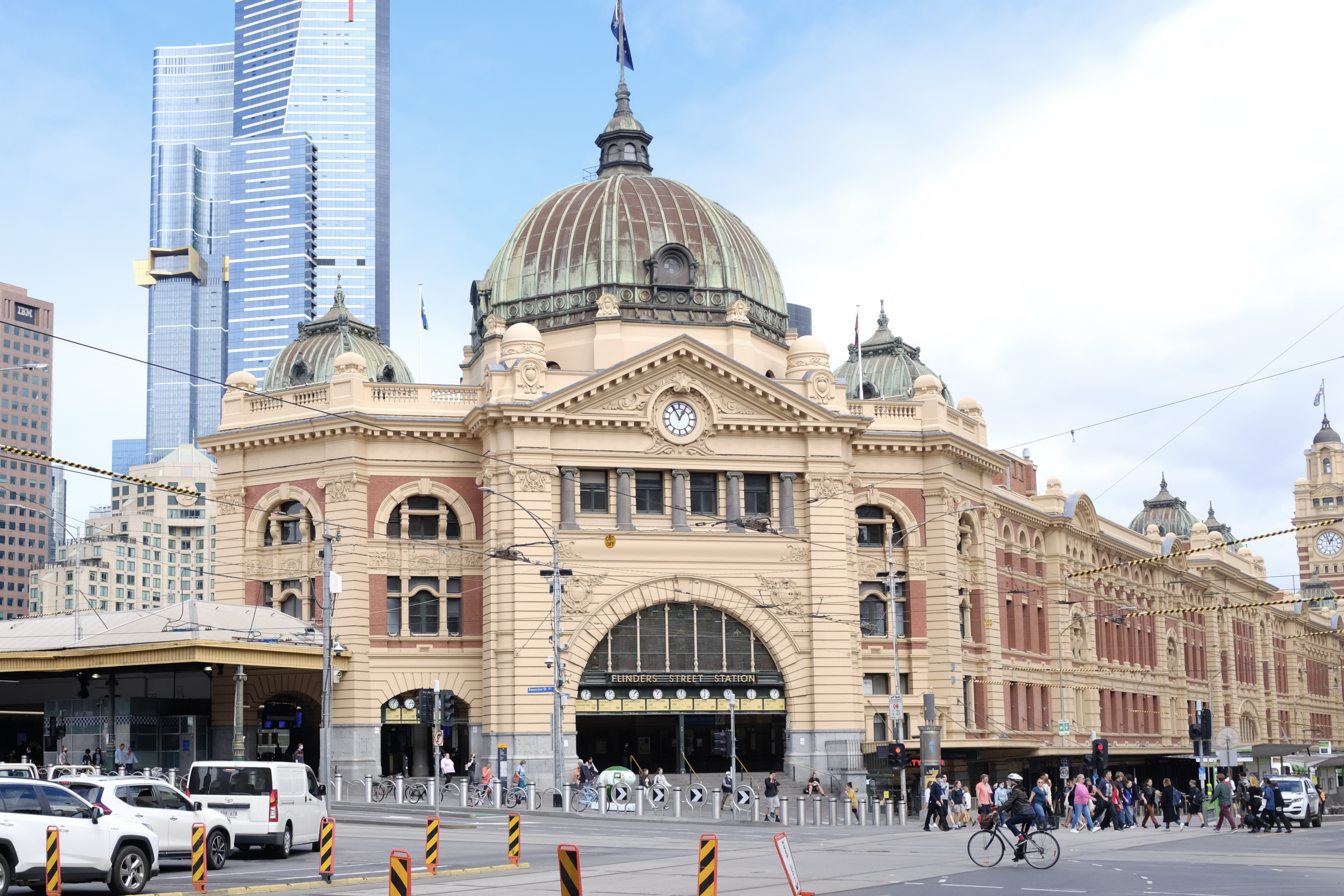
- Flinders Street railway station, March 2021

Overview
- Owner: Victoria State Government as VicTrack
- Area served: Greater Melbourne
- Locale: Victoria, Australia
- Transit type: Suburban rail Rail freight transport
- Number of lines: 16
- Number of stations: 227 stations 1 under construction 15+ planned
- Daily ridership: 450,000 (2021–2022)
- Annual ridership: 182.5 million (2023–2024)
- Headquarters: 700 Collins Street, Docklands (Metro)

Operation
- Began operation: 3 July 1868; 158 years ago (First steam train); 30 November 2009; 16 years ago (Leased to Metro Trains)
- Operator: Metro Trains Melbourne
- Rolling stock: Comeng; HCMT; Siemens Nexas; X'Trapolis 100; X'Trapolis 2.0
- Number of vehicles: 269 six-carriage trains
- Headway: Line dependant

Technical
- System length: 429 km (267 mi) (System length); 370 km (230 mi) (Electrified length); 28 km (17.4 mi) (Exclusive freight)
- Track gauge: 1,600 mm (5 ft 3 in) Victorian broad gauge
- Average speed: 63.6 km/h (39.5 mph) (fastest average); 30.2 km/h (18.8 mph) (slowest average)
- Top speed: 130 km/h (81 mph)

The Melbourne rail network is a metropolitan suburban and freight rail system serving the city of Melbourne, Victoria, Australia. The metropolitan rail network is centred around the Melbourne central business district (CBD) and consists of 227 railway stations across 16 lines, which served a patronage of 182.5 million over the year 2023–2024. It is the core of the larger Victorian railway network, with regional links to both intrastate and interstate rail systems.

Metro Trains Melbourne operates the Melbourne metropolitan rail network under franchise from the Victorian Government, overseen by Transport Victoria, a division of the Department of Transport and Planning. The government-owned entity V/Line operates trains from Melbourne across regional Victoria. The first steam train in Australia commenced service in Melbourne in 1854 between Flinders Street and Sandridge, with the metropolitan rail network having grown over the last two centuries to cover much of the city and greater Melbourne area.

The metropolitan network is a suburban rail system designed to transport passengers from Melbourne's suburbs into the Melbourne central business district (CBD) and associated city loop stations, with the main hub at Flinders Street station. Southern Cross station is the main interchange station between metropolitan and regional V/Line services. The Metro Tunnel project opened in December 2025 to increase rail capacity within the CBD and relieve pressure from the City Loop.

A total length of 1,000 km (620 mi) of track is owned by VicTrack and leased to train operators through Transport Victoria. The railway network is primarily at ground level, with some underground and elevated sections. There were more than 170 level crossings before the Level Crossing Removal Project commenced in 2015 to grade separate 110 of the busiest crossings and rebuild 51 railway stations, with 96 crossings removed by October 2026. The metropolitan network operates primarily between 5:00 a.m. and midnight, with overnight services on Friday night to Saturday morning and Saturday night to Sunday morning, departing from Flinders Street only. Some tracks are also used by freight trains and V/Line regional services.

In addition to the primary commuter and freight railway networks, Melbourne also features heritage railways such as Puffing Billy and has the world's largest urban tram network.

== History ==
=== First railway ===
On 7 September 1851, a public meeting called for the construction of Australia's first railway to link Melbourne and Sandridge (now known as Port Melbourne), which led to the establishment of the privately owned Melbourne and Hobson's Bay Railway Company in 1853.

On 8 February 1853, the Government also approved the establishment of the Geelong and Melbourne Railway Company and the Melbourne, Mount Alexander and Murray River Railway Company. Work began in March 1853 on the Sandridge railway line, stretching 4 kilometres (2.5 mi) from the Melbourne (or City) terminus (on the site of modern-day Flinders Street station) to Sandridge. The line was owned and operated by Melbourne and Hobson's Bay Railway Company, opening in 1854.

In 1855, the Government conducted enquiries and carried out surveys into country railways. On 1 April 1856, the Railway Department was established as part of the Board of Land and Works with George Christian Darbyshire being appointed Engineer in Chief. On 23 May of that year the Melbourne, Mount Alexander and Murray River Railway Company was taken over by the Government.

Trains were ordered from Robert Stephenson and Company of the United Kingdom. The first train was locally built by Robertson, Martin & Smith, however, owing to delays in shipping. Australia's first steam locomotive was built in ten weeks and cost £2,700. Forming the first steam train to travel in Australia, it made its maiden trip on 12 September 1854.

The opening of the line occurred during the period of the Victorian gold rush—a time when both Melbourne and Victoria undertook massive capital works, each with its gala opening. The inaugural journey on the Sandridge line was no exception. According to the Argus newspaper's report of the next day: "Long before the hour appointed . . . a great crowd assembled round the station at the Melbourne terminus, lining the whole of Flinders Street". Lieutenant-Governor Sir Charles Hotham and Lady Hotham were aboard the train—which consisted of two first-class carriages and one-second class—and were presented with satin copies of the railway's timetable and bylaws.

The trip took 10 minutes, none of the later stations along the line having been built. On arriving at Station Pier (onto which the tracks extended), it was hailed with gun salutes by the warships HMS Electra and HMS Fantome.

By March 1855, the four engines ordered from the UK were all in service, with trains running every half-hour. They were named Melbourne, Sandridge, Victoria, and Yarra (after the Yarra River over which the line crossed).

=== Early private companies ===
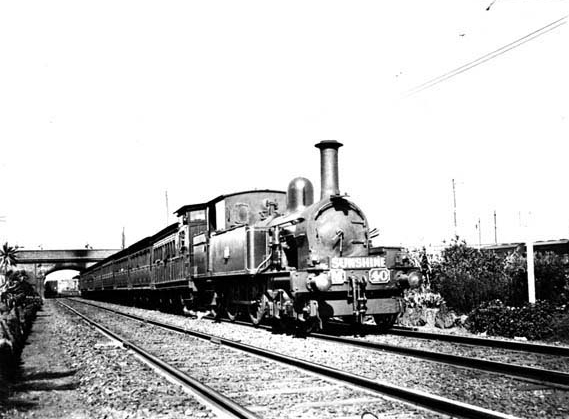
Steam-hauled suburban train departing North Melbourne station for Sunshine, April 1913

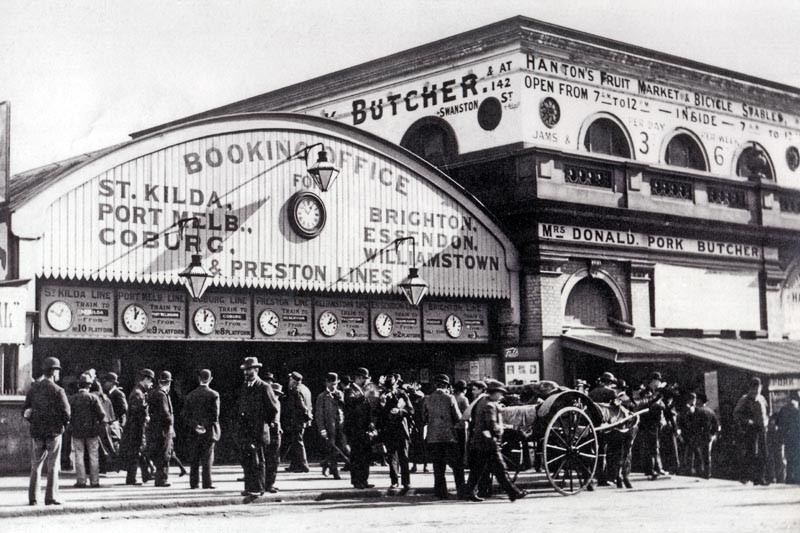
The pre-1910 Flinders Street station building on Swanston Street

The Melbourne and Hobson's Bay Railway Company opened Melbourne's second railway on 13 May 1857, a 4.5 km (2.8 mi) line from the Melbourne (or City) Terminus to St Kilda. The line was later extended by the St Kilda and Brighton Railway Company, which opened a line from St Kilda to Brighton in 1857.

The first country line opened in 1857 when the Geelong and Melbourne Railway Company started services on its line from Geelong to Newport. In 1859, the government-owned Victorian Railways Williamstown line opened, connecting Williamstown and Geelong to Spencer Street station.

More country lines followed in 1859 when the Victorian Railways opened a line from Footscray, on the Williamstown line, to Sunbury. The Victorian Railways had taken over construction from the Melbourne, Mount Alexander and Murray River Railway Company, established in 1853 to build a railway to Echuca, but which had failed to make any progress.

The first line to Melbourne's south-eastern suburbs was opened in 1859 by the Melbourne and Suburban Railway Company, running from Princes Bridge railway station to Punt Road (Richmond), South Yarra, and Prahran. That line was extended to Windsor in 1860, connecting with the St Kilda and Brighton Railway Company line from St Kilda. The new line replaced the indirect St Kilda and Windsor line to the city, which was closed in 1867.

Another suburban line was built by the Melbourne and Essendon Railway Company in 1860, running from North Melbourne to Essendon, with a branch line from Newmarket to Flemington Racecourse, which opened in 1861. On the eastern side of the city, the Melbourne and Suburban Railway Company opened a branch line from Richmond to Burnley and Hawthorn in 1861.

By that point, the railways of Melbourne were a disjointed group of city-centric lines, with various companies operating from three unconnected city terminals—Princes Bridge, Flinders Street, and Spencer Street stations.

The smaller companies quickly encountered financial problems. The St Kilda and Brighton Railway Company and Melbourne and Suburban Railway Company were absorbed by the Melbourne and Hobson's Bay Railway Company in 1865, forming the Melbourne and Hobsons Bay United Railway Company. The Melbourne and Essendon Railway Company was taken over by the Victorian Government in 1867. The Melbourne and Hobsons Bay United Railway Company was not taken over by the Victorian Government until 1878.

The terminals themselves were linked in 1879, when the track was built at street level along the southern side of Flinders Street, connecting with Spencer Street station, although the track was only used at night, for freight traffic. It was not until 1889 that the two-track Flinders Street Viaduct was built between the two city terminus stations.

The outward expansion also continued, with major trunk lines being opened in rural Victoria. The Victorian Railways extended its line to Broadmeadows in 1872, as part of the line to Seymour and Albury-Wodonga. In 1879, the Gippsland line was opened from South Yarra to Caulfield, Pakenham and Bairnsdale.

=== Land boom lines ===
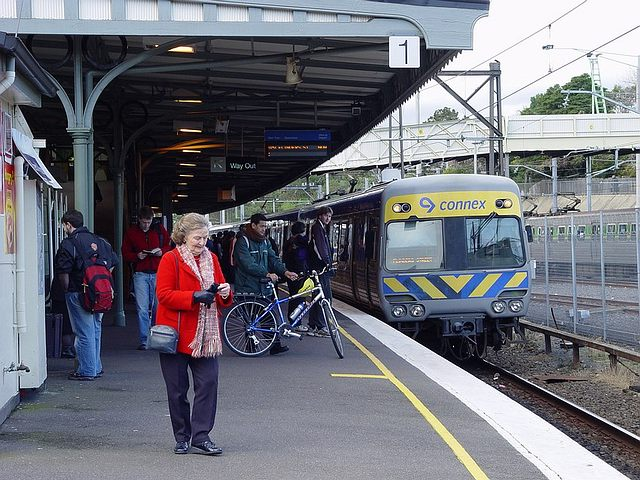
Connex train arriving at Camberwell station, June 2004

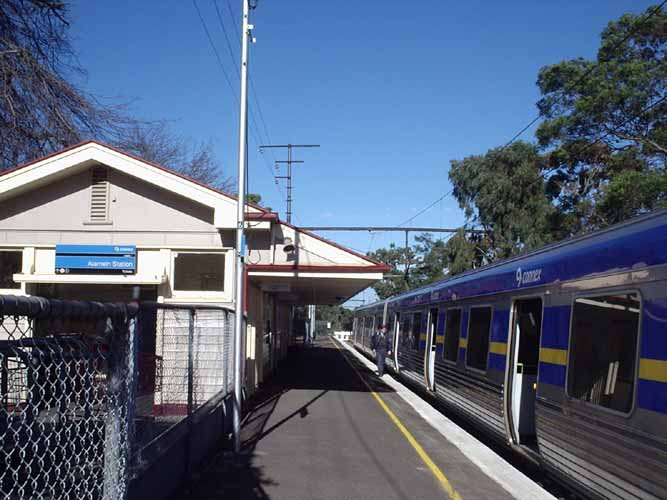
Train at Alamein station, March 2003

The 1870s and 1880s were a time of great growth and prosperity in Melbourne. Land speculation companies were formed, to buy up outer suburban land cheaply, and to agitate for suburban railways to be built or extended to serve those land holdings and increase land values. By 1880, the "Land Boom" was in full swing in Victoria, re-elected in the passing of the Railway Construction Act 1884, later known as the Octopus Act, which authorised the building of 66 railway lines throughout the state.

The Frankston line began with the opening of a line from Caulfield to Mordialloc in 1881, reaching the terminus in 1882. A second new suburban railway line was opened from Spencer Street Station to Coburg in 1884, and extended to Somerton in 1889, meeting the main line from Spencer Street to Wodonga. Land developers opened a private railway from Newport to Altona in 1888, but it was closed in 1890, due to lack of demand.

The line from Hawthorn was extended, to Camberwell in 1882, Lilydale in 1883, and Healesville in 1889. In addition, a branch line (now known as the Belgrave line) was opened from Ringwood to Upper Ferntree Gully in 1889. A short branch two station was also opened from Hawthorn to Kew in 1887. The Brighton Beach line was also extended to Sandringham in 1887.

In 1888, railways came to the northeastern suburbs with the opening of the Inner Circle line from Spencer Street station via Royal Park station to what is now Victoria Park station, and then on to Heidelberg. A branch was also opened off the Inner Circle in Fitzroy North, to Epping and Whittlesea in 1888 and 1889. Trains between Spencer Street and Heidelberg reversed at Victoria Park until a link was opened between Victoria Park and Princes Bridge in 1901.

The Outer Circle line opened in 1890, linking Oakleigh (on the Gippsland line) to Riversdale (with a branch to Camberwell on the Lilydale line) and Fairfield (on the Heidelberg line). Originally envisaged to link the Gippsland line with Spencer Street station in the 1870s, this reason disappeared with the building of a direct link via South Yarra before the line had even opened. The line saw little traffic as it traversed empty paddocks, and with no through traffic, the Outer Circle was closed in sections between 1893 and 1897. The Camberwell to Ashburton stretch of the Outer Circle re-opened in 1899, and then in 1900, part of the northern section of the Outer Circle reopened as a shuttle service between East Camberwell and Deepdene station. This line closed in 1927.

At the same time as the Outer Circle, a railway was opened from Burnley to Darling and a junction with the Outer Circle at Waverley Road (near the current East Malvern station). A stub of the future Glen Waverley line, it was cut back to Darling in 1895.

Railway building during the land boom hit a peak with the construction of the Rosstown Railway between Elsternwick and Oakleigh. Built by William Murry Ross, the line was planned in the 1870s to serve a sugar beet mill near Caulfield. Construction commenced in 1883, followed by rebuilding in 1888. Ross's debts grew, and he attempted to sell the line many times without success. It never opened to traffic and was later dismantled.

The stock market crash of early 1890s led to an extended period of economic depression in Victoria and put an end to most railway construction until the next decade.

By the 1900s, the driving force for new railway lines was agriculturalists in what are now Melbourne's outer suburbs. In the Dandenong Ranges a narrow gauge 762 mm line was opened from Upper Ferntree Gully to Belgrave and Gembrook in 1900 to serve the local farming and timber community. In the Yarra Valley, a branch was opened from Lilydale to Yarra Junction and Warburton in 1901. Part of this line is now listed on the Victorian Heritage Register.

In 1901, in preparation for the occasion of a royal visit by the Duke of York, the first Australian royal train was assembled in Melbourne.

The Heidelberg line was extended to Eltham in 1902 and Hurstbridge in 1912. The freight-only Mont Park line was also opened in 1911, branching from Macleod. Finally, on the Mornington Peninsula, a branch was built from Bittern to Red Hill in 1921.

=== Electrification ===
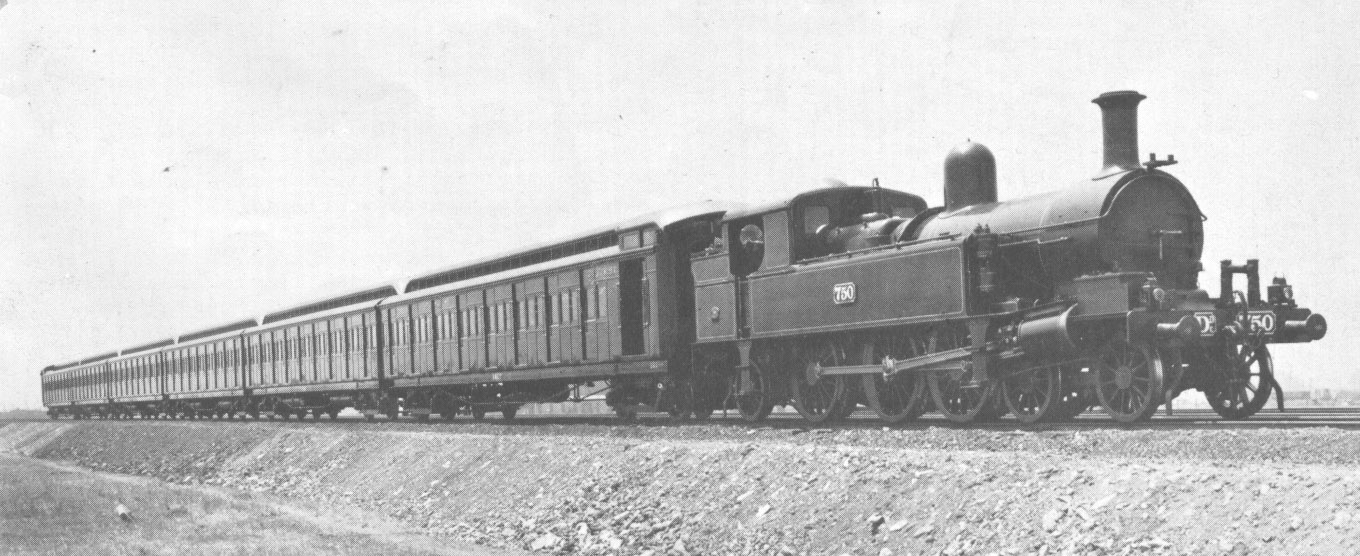
First set of Tait suburban passenger carriages hauled by steam locomotive Dde 750, c. 1913

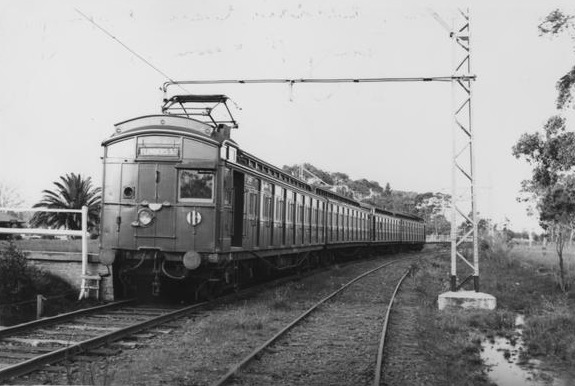
Four-car Tait train at the Spring Vale Cemetery platform

Planning for electrification was started by Victorian Railways chairman Thomas James Tait, who engaged English engineer Charles Hesterman Merz to deliver a report on the electrification of the Melbourne suburban network. His first report in 1908 recommended a three-stage plan over two years, covering 200 route-kilometres existing lines and almost 500 suburban carriages (approximately 80 trains). The report was considered by the Government and the Railway Commissioners, and Merz was engaged to deliver a second report based on their feedback.

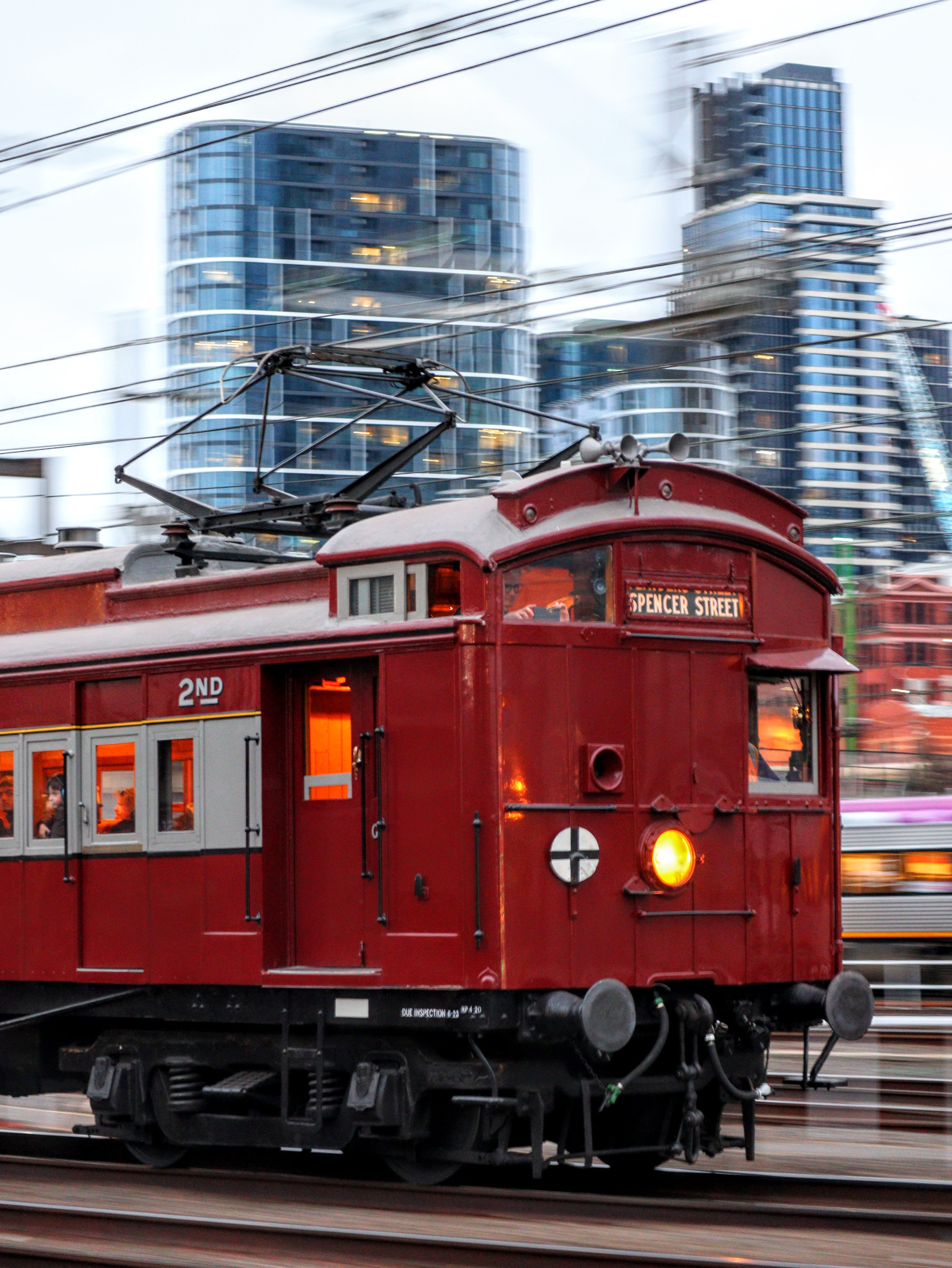
A restored vintage electric "Tait" set (aka "Red Rattler") near Southern Cross station, July 2022

Delivered in 1912, this second report recommended an expanded system of electrification to 240 route km. of existing lines (463 track km), and almost 800 suburban carriages (approximately 130 trains). The works were approved by the State Government in December 1912. It was envisaged that the first electric trains would be running by 1915, and the project would be completed by 1917. However, progress fell behind because World War I restrictions prevented electrical equipment from being imported from the United Kingdom.

Rolling stock construction continued, with several older suburban carriages converted for electric use as the Swing Door trains, while the first of the Tait trains were introduced as steam-hauled carriages. Track expansion was also carried out, with four tracks being provided between South Yarra and Caulfield, as well as grade separation from roads. Victorian Railways in 1918 opened the Newport Power Station, the largest power station in the urban area, to supply electricity as part of the electrification project. The State Electricity Commission of Victoria was formed in 1921 but did not take over Newport A power station until 1951.

The first trials did not occur until October 1918 on the Flemington Racecourse line. Driver training continued on this line until 18 May 1919, when the first electric train ran between Sandringham and Essendon, simulating revenue services. Electric services started on 28 May 1919 with the first train running to Essendon, then on to Sandringham, with full services starting the next day. The Burnley–Darling line, the Fawkner line, the reopened branch to Altona, and the Williamstown line followed in 1920.

The line to Broadmeadows, the Whittlesea line to Reservoir, the Bendigo line to St Albans, and the inner sections of the Hurstbridge line was electrified in 1921. The Gippsland line to Dandenong and Frankston line were electrified in 1922, as was the inner section of the Ringwood line due to regrading works.

The original electrification scheme was completed in 1923, but over the next three years, several short extensions were carried out. The Ashburton line was electrified in 1924, and final works on the Lilydale line were completed in 1925, as was electrification on the line to Upper Ferntree Gully. Electrification on the outer ends of the Hurstbridge line was completed by 1926, the Whittlesea line to Thomastown was electrified in 1929, and the Burnley – Darling line was extended to Glen Waverley in 1930 to become the Glen Waverley line.

=== Post-War rebuilding ===
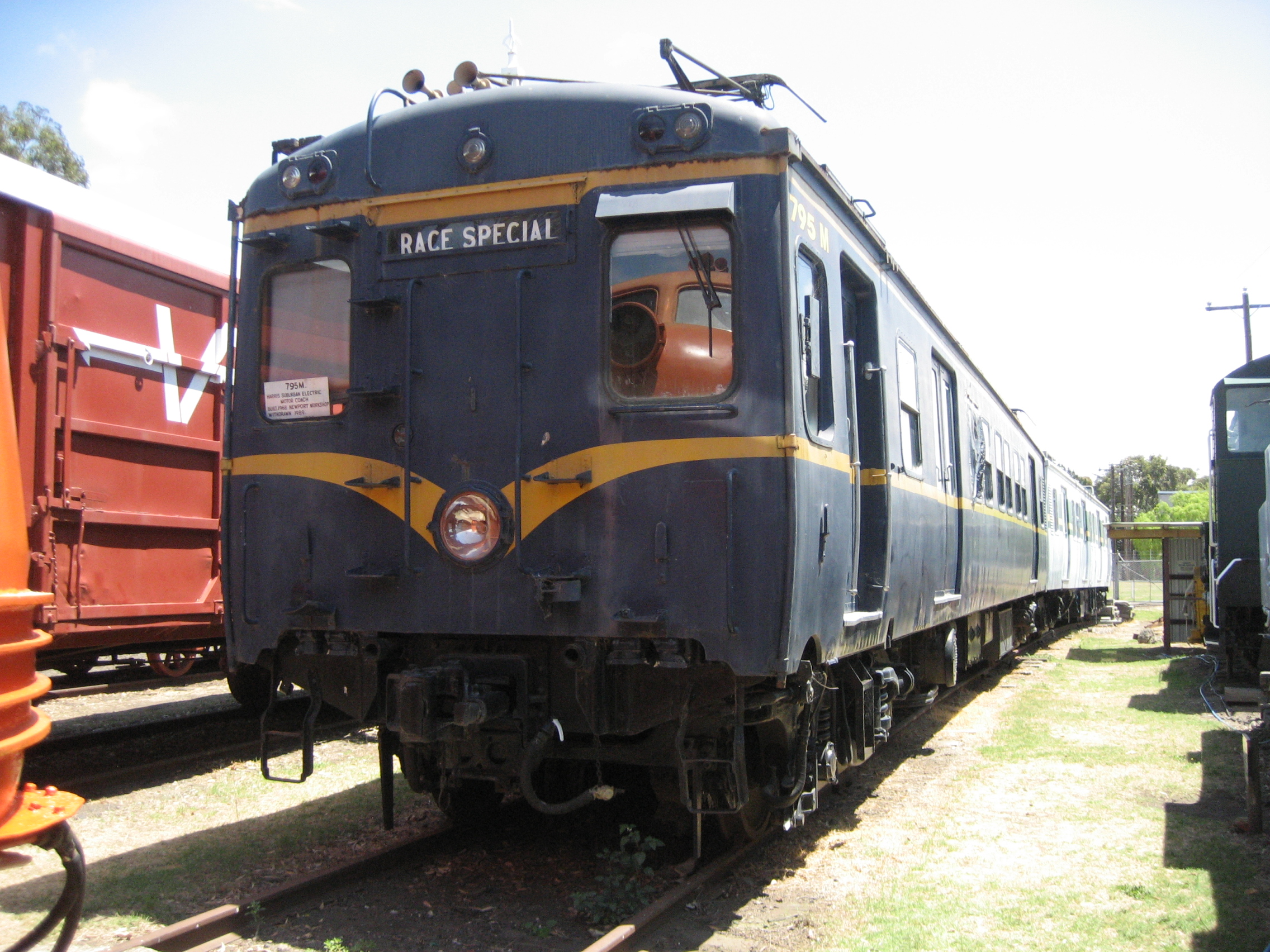
A Harris train in the Newport Railway Museum, January 2007

Railways experienced increased patronage into the 1940s, but railway improvements recommended in the Ashworth Improvement Plan were delayed until after World War II. It was not until 1950 that the Victorian Railways were able to put their Operation Phoenix rebuilding plan into action. The delivery of the Harris trains, the first steel suburban trains on the network, enabled the retirement of the oldest of the Swing Door trains.

Railway lines were extended during this period to encompass Melbourne's growing suburbia. The Ashburton line was extended along the old Outer Circle track formation to Alamein station in 1948. The Fawkner line to Upfield and the Reservoir line to Lalor were both electrified in 1959, the Epping line reaching Epping in 1964. A great deal of track amplification was also undertaken, with several single-line sections eliminated.

The Upper Ferntree Gully to Belgrave section of the Gembrook narrow gauge line was converted to broad gauge and electrified in 1962. The remainder of the line was closed in 1954 but has been progressively reopened by the Puffing Billy Railway. The Gippsland line was electrified in 1954 as part of the works being carried out on the line, but suburban services to Pakenham did not start until 1975.

During this rebuilding, several little-used lines were closed on the edges of Melbourne. The Bittern to Red Hill line and the Kew branch both closed in 1953, the line between Lalor railway station and Whittlesea closed in 1959, and the Lilydale to Warburton line closed in 1964. The final stages of the rebuilding stretched into the 1970s, with track amplification carried out to Footscray, and Box Hill, and the first deliveries of the stainless steel Hitachi trains.

Detailed planning for the Doncaster line also commenced in that period and, by 1972, the route was finalised. Despite rising costs, state governments of the period continued to give assurances that the line would be built but, by 1984, land reserved for the line had been sold.

=== Modernisation ===
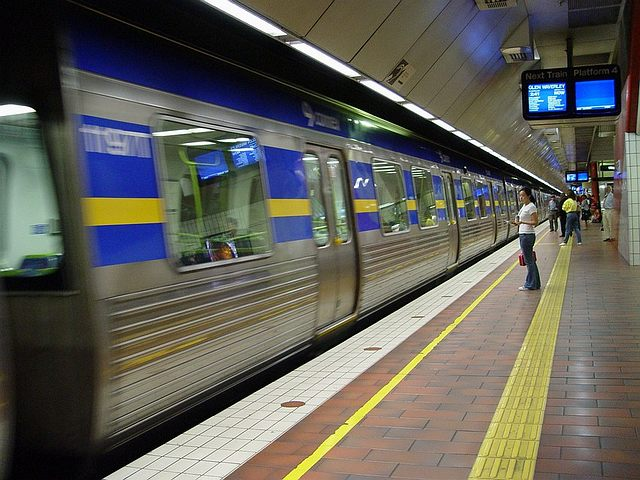
Melbourne Central railway station in the underground City Loop, June 2004

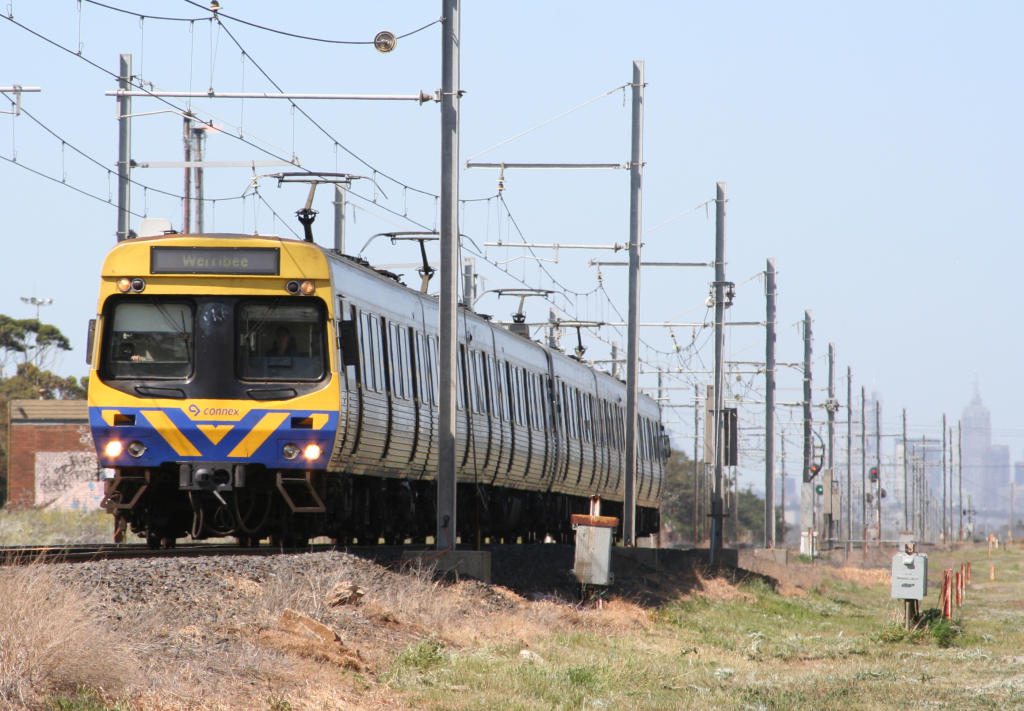
Comeng train on the Werribee line, October 2007

By the 1970s, Melbourne's railway network was run down, with the last major investment on the suburban tracks having taken place nearly fifty years earlier. Sixty-year-old Tait trains (known colloquially as "red rattlers") were still in operation, and inner city congestion at Flinders Street led to peak hour delays. In February 1971, the Melbourne Underground Rail Loop Act was passed, establishing the Melbourne Underground Rail Loop Authority (MURLA) to build a connecting series of tunnels from the major stations along the north, south, east and west extremities of the Melbourne CBD. The project ran for over 14 years, opening progressively between 1981 and 1985. The loop was designed and constructed to improve the capacity of Flinders Street and Spencer Street stations to handle suburban trains and to offer easier connections for users.

Other major changes took place in 1976 when the government authority overseeing Victorian Railways became VicRail and was gradually restructured along corporate lines. Following the restructure, in 1980 the Victorian Transport Study, better known as the Lonie Report, was delivered and called for financial rationalisation. The closure of the Port Melbourne, St. Kilda, Altona, Williamstown, Alamein and Sandringham lines was also recommended, along with their replacement with bus routes instead. These recommendations and cuts were not enacted, however many uneconomical branch lines were closed throughout the rest of the state. The line between Lilydale and Healesville was closed in 1980, now used by the Yarra Valley Railway beyond Yarra Glen. The branch from Baxter to Mornington was closed in 1981, but the line south of Moorooduc is now operated by the Mornington Railway as a tourist route.

The Metrol train control centre was opened in 1980 to coordinate trains throughout the network using computer software that remains in use today. Public transport in Melbourne was also reorganised, with the Metropolitan Transit Authority (MTA) formed in 1983 to coordinate all train, tram and bus services in the city to improve interoperability. With the electrification of the Werribee line in 1983, followed two years later by an extension of the Altona line to Laverton, and the City Loop in full operation by 1985, the last major modernisation of Melbourne's train lines in the 20th century was complete.

Isolated from the City Loop, the Port Melbourne and St Kilda lines were converted to standard gauge light rail in 1987 to accommodate tram routes 111 (now Route 109) and 96. Route 96 remains one of the world's top 10 tram routes and Melbourne's busiest.

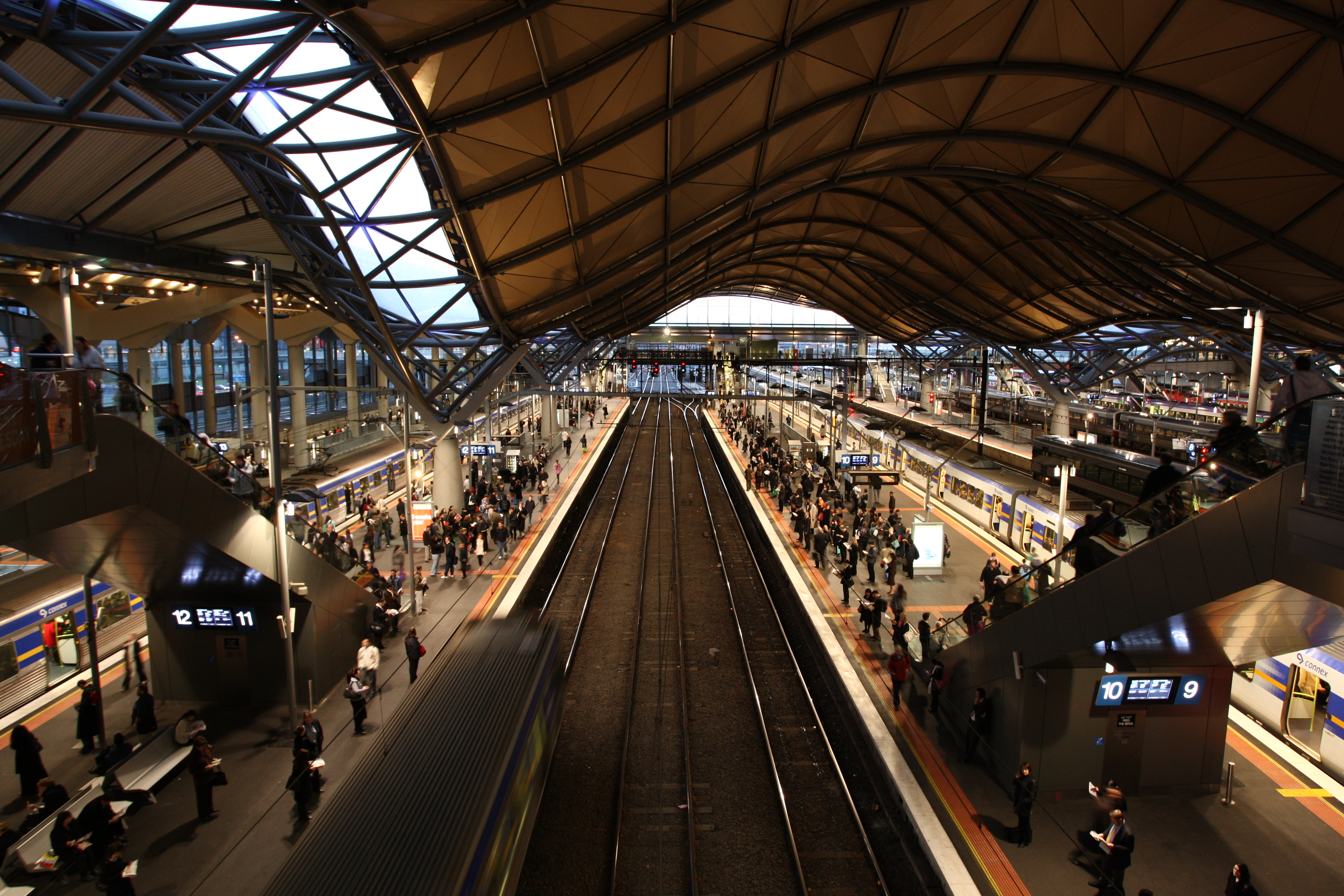
The modern Southern Cross station, August 2007

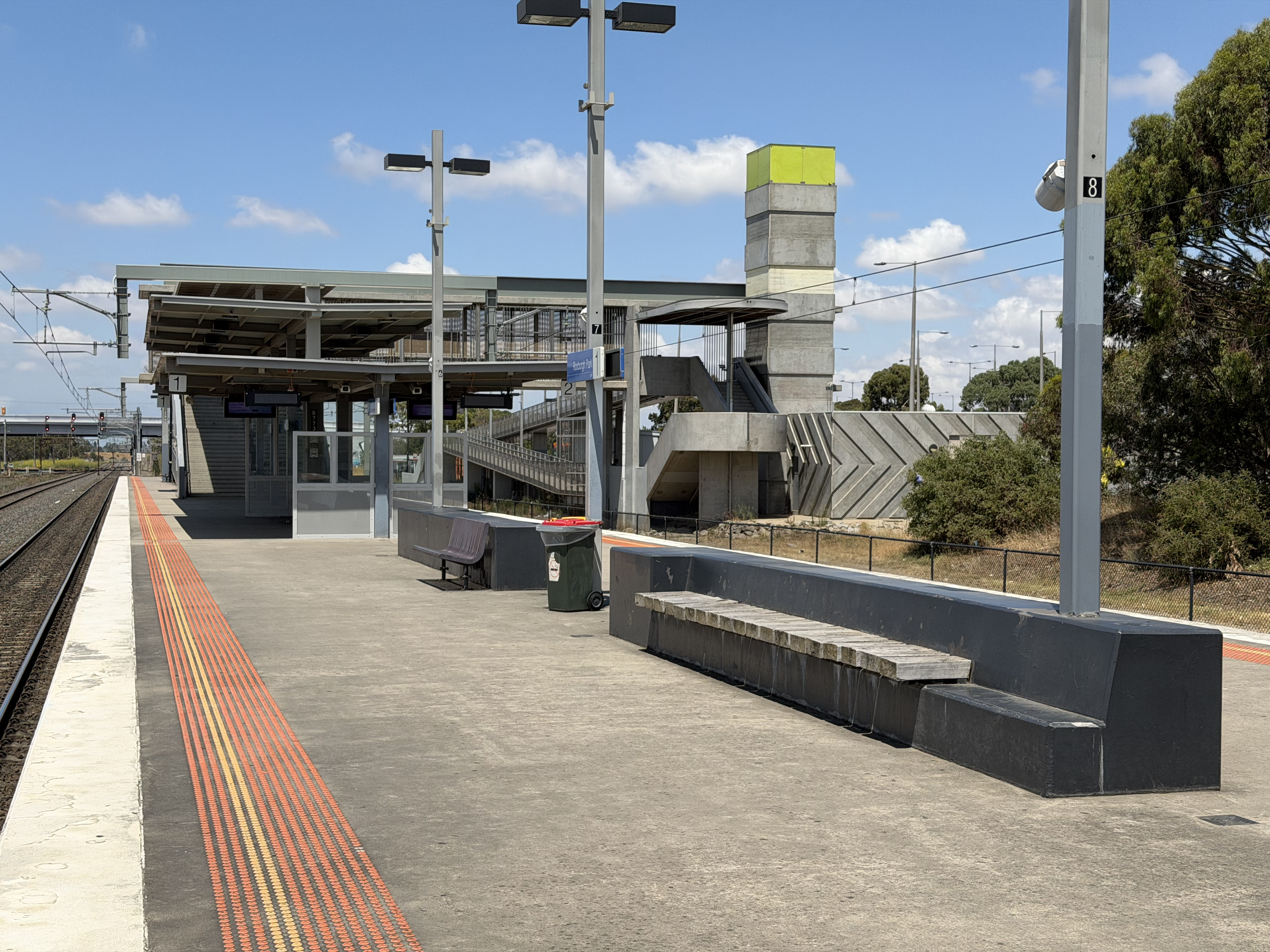
Roxburgh Park station, opened in 2007.

The early 1990s saw further changes, with the MTA reborn as the Public Transport Corporation, trading as "The Met".

State governments of both sides of politics began to push for reform of the railway network, proposing the conversion of the Upfield, Williamstown and Alamein lines to light rail. Those proposals were not proceeded with, and the Upfield line received a series of upgrades to replace labour-intensive manual signalling systems. Federal government funding was made available for the electrification of the South Gippsland line, which was completed in 1995. Rationalisation of the Jolimont rail yard commenced, enabling the creation and expansion of Melbourne Park in 1988 and 1996, and the future construction of Federation Square in 2001.

After the election of the Kennett government in 1992, several controversial reforms to the operation of the railway system were initiated. Guards were removed from suburban trains and train drivers took over the task of door operation. Stations were de-staffed, and the Metcard ticketing system was introduced to replace the scratch-card system. Over that period more than $250 million in operating costs were stripped from the Melbourne network, as the government sought to rein in the state debt of $32 billion.

=== Privatisation ===
In 1998, "The Met" was split into two operating units—Hillside Trains and Bayside Trains―each franchised to a different private operator. Ownership of land and infrastructure of rail and tram services was transferred to a new Victorian Government agency, VicTrack. In addition, a statutory office was created in Government—the Director of Public Transport—with specific responsibility for entering into franchise agreements with public transport operators to operate rail and tram services throughout Victoria. By 1999, the privatisation process was complete, with Connex Melbourne and M>Train operating half of the network. In 2003, the parent company of M>Train (National Express) withdrew from operating public transport in Victoria, and half of the suburban network was transferred to Connex as part of a renegotiated contract.

The franchising contracts contained provisions for the new operators to refurbish the Comeng trains, and to replace the older Hitachi trains. Connex purchased Alstom X'Trapolis sets, while M>Train chose Siemens Nexas units.

In May 2005, the State Government commissioned a A$25 million study into the feasibility of a third track for the Dandenong line to increase capacity for the rapidly growing suburban area. The cost of the triplication process was expected to be as high as A$1 billion, as project activities would have included the organization of corresponding bus services for the rail line, changes to stations and platforms along the line, and the improvement of the signalling system. This project was ultimately sidelined and not delivered by the Brumby Government.

In 2006, Professor Paul Mees and a group of academics estimated that privatisation had cost taxpayers $1.2 billion more than if the system had remained both publicly owned and operated. With the franchise extensions in 2009, taxpayers were to pay an estimated $2.1 billion more by 2010. However, the Institute of Public Affairs released its report on Melbourne's privatisation, which assessed it as a modest success and observed that a 37.6% increase in patronage on the metropolitan rail system had reversed years of patronage decline due to poor quality services. The Auditor General of Victoria also performed a comprehensive audit report into the franchises and found that "the franchises represent reasonable value for money".

=== Ridership boom and Metro Trains Melbourne ===
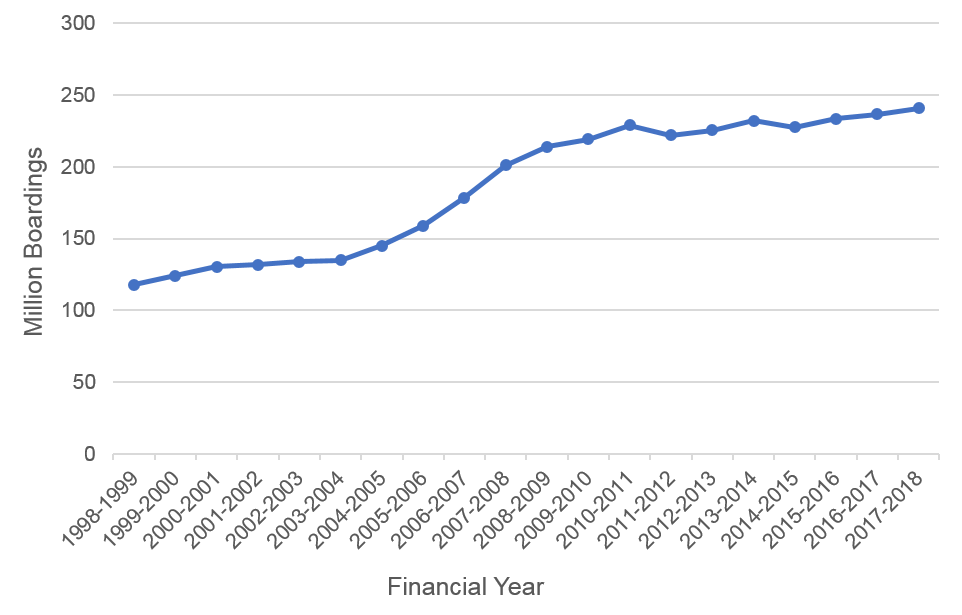
Metropolitan train patronage 1998–2018 based on official state government figures.

Beginning in the mid-2000s, a rapid increase in patronage of Melbourne's train network occurred. In the three years between the financial year 2005 and 2008, rail patronage grew by 35 per cent. Trips grew from 148 million in 2004 to more than 200 million in 2008.

In November 2007, Singapore's SMRT Transit and Hong Kong's MTR Corporation Limited expressed interest in taking control of Melbourne's suburban rail network from Connex in November 2009, when their contract was to be reviewed.

On 25 June 2009, Connex lost its bid to renew its contract with the Victorian Government. Hong Kong backed and owned MTR Corporation took over the Melbourne train network on 30 November 2009, operating as a locally themed consortium Metro Trains Melbourne. MTR is a non-public railway owner and operator in Hong Kong where it is well known for constructing Transit Oriented Developments (TODS) above and around its stations. Metro began operation on 1 December 2009, promising to draw on its international experience to improve Melbourne's rail operations.

Transport minister Lynne Kosky stated that the Government's A$10.5 billion, 10-year major transport plan, announced in May 2006, had significantly underestimated the usage rates of public transport. Original assessments had forecast increases of around 3–4%, far short of the 10% seen year-on-year. The State Government responded by purchasing new trains and introducing a new ticketing option that enabled commuters to pay a reduced fare if their journey finished by 7 am.

In 2008, the Brumby Government announced a $14.1 billion Victorian Transport Plan to augment Melbourne's rail network. The plan included:

- The Metro Tunnel, costing more than $4.5 billion, consists of an underground train network —the first new underground rail line since the construction of the City Loop 25 years earlier— from Dynon to South Yarra. Aimed at "relieving overcrowding on the busy suburban lines from Melbourne’s west," the underground line was also designed to provide direct rail access to Melbourne University, the Women's Hospital and the Royal Children's Hospital.
- Rolling stock, $2.65 billion for up to 70 new trains, including 32 High Capacity Metro Trains.
- Rail extensions to Cranbourne East and Mernda, and electrification to Melton.
- Improvements to train operations, for $200 million.
- Upgrades to metro stations, costing $50 million, and new stations in growth areas for $220 million.
- A Park & Ride expansion package costing $60 million.
- The previously reduced Early Bird ticket was also made free as part of these changes, following a trial on the Frankston and Sydenham lines.

Following the investment announcement, the plan for the introduction of more than 200 new weekly train services was released to tackle overcrowding on the city's busiest train lines, a problem that had been attributed to a lack of trains and falling reliability.

On 1 May 2009, the State Government announced that they had committed $562.3 million in the 2009 State Budget for the extension of the Epping line 3.5 kilometres north to South Morang. Construction started in 2010 and was completed in 2012.

=== Network development and level-crossing removals ===
In May 2011, operations commenced on a new metropolitan timetable, rewritten for the first time since 1996 with over 600 additional weekday services added. In 2012, a Public Transport Development Authority trading as Public Transport Victoria (now Transport Victoria) was established to coordinate, plan and regulate the state's public transport services, including the metropolitan rail system. In the same year, the Metcard ticketing system was discontinued, completing the controversial network-wide roll-out of the new Myki smart card system. On 27 March 2013, Public Transport Victoria published its Network Development Plan – Metropolitan Rail, detailing a 4-stage plan spread over 20 years to redevelop Melbourne's rail system into a "metro-style" network, by separating train lines and creating point-to-point lines, upgrading to high-capacity signalling and ordering new trains.

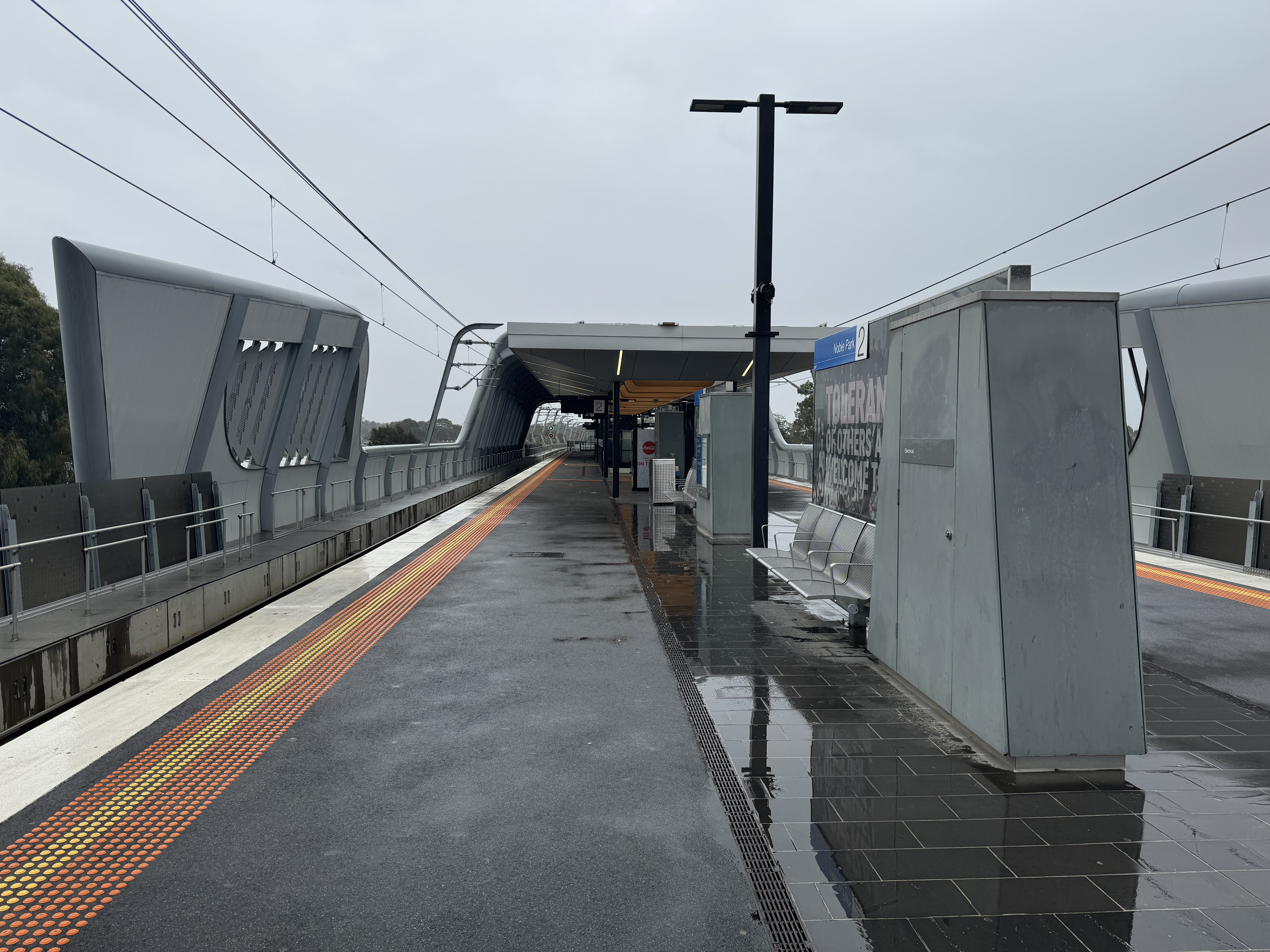
The elevated Noble Park railway station was rebuilt in 2018 along with four other stations on the Gippsland and South Gippsland lines as part of the Level Crossing Removal Project, which eliminated nine-level crossings on the corridor using elevated rail.

A key campaign promise of the Andrews government before its election in 2014 was to remove 50 level crossings in eight years, the most intensive such program in Melbourne's history. Because of Melbourne's generally level topography, the suburban rail network was constructed with a large number of level crossings. By 2014, over 170 remained, due to a lack of funding for grade separations after 1918. The Government's Level Crossing Removal Project became a resounding political success, despite concerns it was creating poor value-for-money infrastructure and controversy about the selection of elevated rail as a method for removing some crossings.

By 2018, 29 level crossings had been fully grade-separated, well ahead of the government's original schedule, and a further 25 crossings were added to the program to be completed by 2025. The project includes rebuilding or upgrading 27 train stations, such as Bentleigh and Clayton railway stations, or laying new tracks, such as the duplication of 1.2 km (0.75 mi) of single-track railway between Heidelberg and the rebuilt Rosanna stations. Large sections of elevated rail have been built on the Gippsland line, and further sections were planned for the Mernda and Upfield lines, including a 4 km (2.49 mi) section on the Mernda line in Preston.

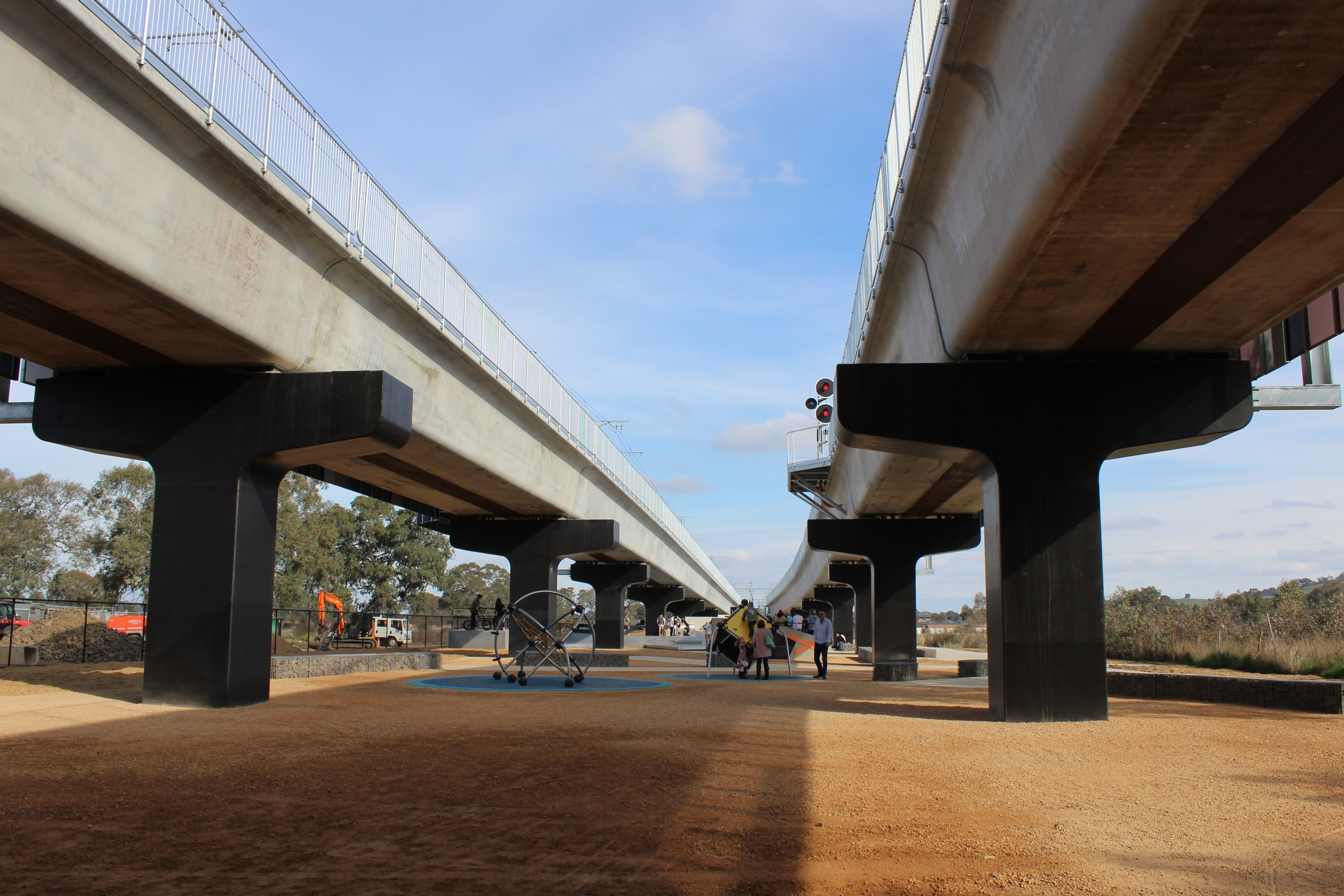
New elevated rail lines at Mernda in Melbourne's north, part of an 8 km (5.0 mi) rail extension that opened in August 2018.

In mid-2015, the Regional Rail Link project was completed. It created a new Deer Park–West Werribee railway line in the city's west, with stations at Wyndham Vale and Tarneit, as well as adding a pair of non-electrified tracks between Sunshine and Southern Cross for regional trains. Although the project was intended to provide routes for regional trains to Geelong, Ballarat and Bendigo segregated from electrified Metro services, rapid population growth in areas served by the new line meant that V/Line trains had to perform the role of an outer suburban service, causing significant delays and overcrowding.

A redesigned network map was released by PTV at the end of 2016, which replaced an emphasis on fare zones with a delineation of individual lines and service patterns. The new map also incorporated regional services and was designed to be accessible to passengers with the most common types of colour blindness.

Metro's contract to operate the suburban network was renewed in 2017 for a further seven years. The renegotiated contracts included higher monthly performance targets, which Metro failed to meet six times in the first year of the contract's operation.

Construction of an extension of the South Morang line to Mernda commenced in 2016 and was opened on 29 August 2018. The project included 8 km (4.97 mi) of new electrified railway, new stations at Middle Gorge and Hawkstowe, and a new terminus at a rebuilt Mernda station.

In April 2019, the Victorian Government announced that Public Transport Victoria would be merged with VicRoads under a new Department of Transport and Planning, providing public-facing transport information using the brand "Transport Victoria".

=== Metro Tunnel ===
Map of the Metro Tunnel, a 9km tunnel through Melbourne's CBD that is planned to increase capacity at the core of the rail network.

In February 2015, the State Government established the Melbourne Metro Rail Authority to oversee planning for new twin nine-kilometre rail tunnels through the central city, between South Kensington station and South Yarra. The Metro Tunnel will have five new underground stations and connect the Gippsland line with the Sunbury line, creating a new route through the CBD as an alternative to the City Loop. New underground stations will be built at Arden, Parkville, Domain and there will be two new CBD stations, State Library and Town Hall. Enabling works were underway by 2016 and major construction work on the tunnel and stations began in 2017. The project has an estimated cost of $11 billion and is scheduled to be complete by 2025.

In September 2016, the State Government ordered 65 new High Capacity Metro Trains for delivery from mid-2019, which will eventually become the primary rolling stock used in the Metro Tunnel.

In April, June and July 2019, a number of rail lines in Melbourne's east were shut down for several weeks to allow construction of the tunnel entrances near Kensington and South Yarra. The first tunnel boring machine began to be assembled in North Melbourne in June 2019. In May 2021, TBM Meg broke through at the future site of Town Hall station, marking the completion of tunnelling for the project. TBM Millie, Alice and Joan completed tunnelling over the previous month. The tunnelling phase lasted 20 months.

== Future ==
A number of major expansion projects are under construction or planned for the network. In addition, a number of major upgrades are proposed, including the extension of the Level Crossing Removal Project, which will remove 110 level crossings and rebuild 51 stations across the suburban rail network.

Major expansions and upgrades
Project	Stage	Start date	Completion date	Length	Stations	Description
Melton Line Electrification		2027	2030	25 km	6	Metro line branch to Melton
Melbourne Airport Rail		2022	2032	20 km	2	Metro line branch to Melbourne Airport
Suburban Rail Loop (SRL)	1: SRL East	2022	2035	28 km	6	Orbital metro line, Cheltenham to Box Hill
Suburban Rail Loop (SRL)	2: SRL North	TBD	2043–50	32 km	7	Box Hill to Melbourne Airport
Suburban Rail Loop (SRL)	3: SRL West	TBD	TBD	TBD	TBD	Sunshine to Werribee
Level Crossing Removal Project		2016	2030	N/A	51 station rebuilds	110 road-rail level crossing removals
Short extensions and infill stations
New Deer Park-West Werribee line infill stations		TBD	TBD	N/A	2	Infill stations at Tarneit West and Truganina

=== Melbourne Airport Rail ===
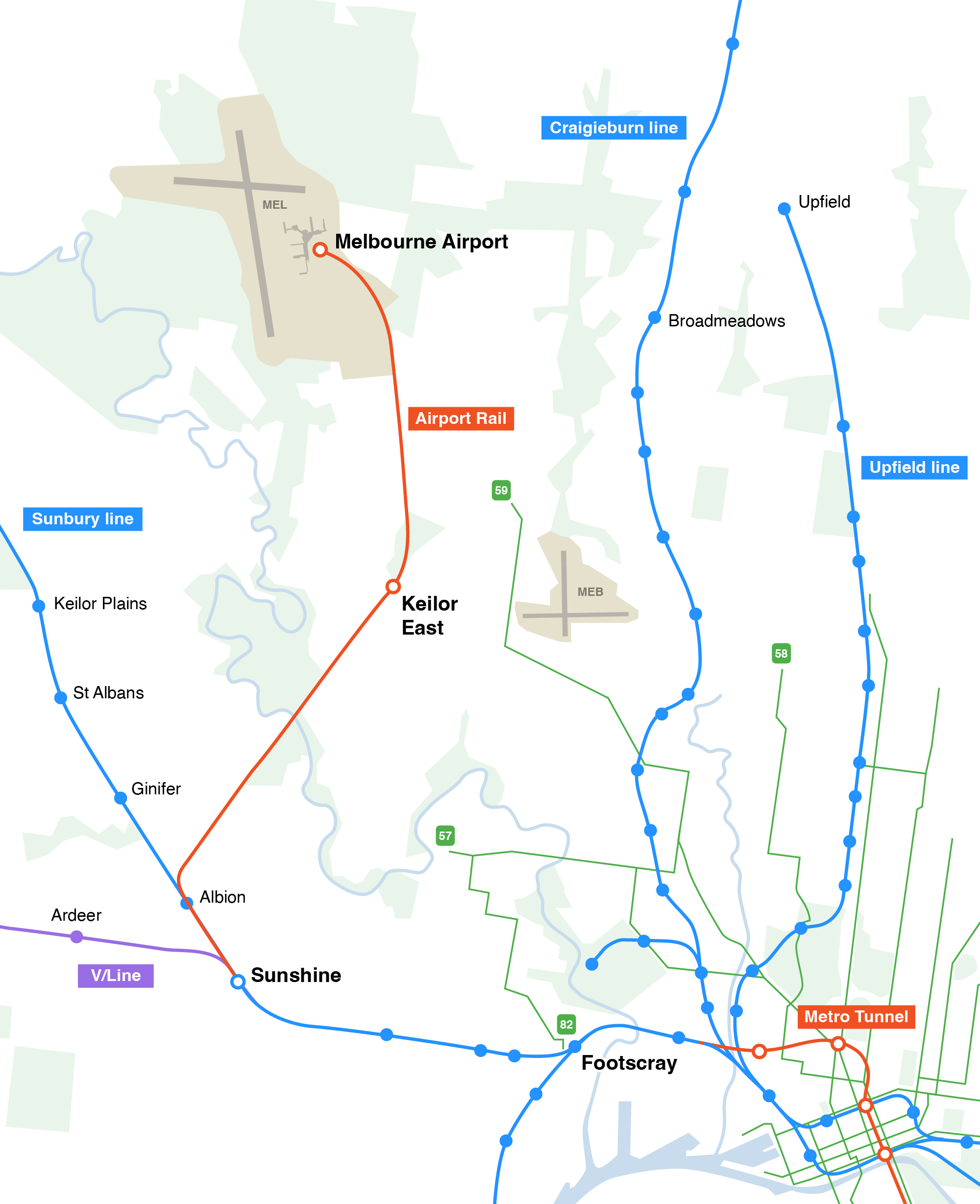
Map of the proposed Melbourne Airport Rail Link

A rail link to Melbourne Airport has been proposed repeatedly since the airport's construction, with a variety of routes and service models suggested, but construction has never commenced. In July 2018, the Federal and State Governments each pledged A$5 billion (for a total of A$10 billion) to construct a rail link. The Federal Government proposed four possible routes for the link, with one proposal running via a direct tunnel to Highpoint Shopping Centre and the others linking to existing stations in Broadmeadows, Flemington or Sunshine.

An assessment of the four routes conducted by Rail Projects Victoria culminated in the route via Sunshine station being selected. The line with run through the Metro Tunnel and will include a new intermediate station at Keilor East to serve Melbourne's north-west. Construction began in 2022, however by May 2023 the project was indefinitely paused, placing the expected completion by 2029 into doubt.

=== Suburban Rail Loop ===
In August 2018, in the run-up to the 2018 Victorian state election, the State Government pledged $300 million to complete a business case and secure funding to construct a new railway through suburban Melbourne. The project is designed to link major activity centres and amenities such as hospitals, shopping centres, universities, and Melbourne Airport. The proposal would connect most existing railway lines through middle suburbs and enable easier intra-suburban travel.

Diagram showing Melbourne's passenger rail network, including former and planned lines.

The Suburban Rail Loop (SRL) would connect the existing station at Cheltenham with other existing stations at Clayton, Glen Waverley, Box Hill, Heidelberg, Reservoir, Fawkner, Broadmeadows, Sunshine and Werribee. It will also link to new stations to be built in areas that have long been promised rail connections, including Monash University, Burwood, Doncaster, Bundoora and Melbourne Airport. The first stage, SRL East, from Cheltenham to Box Hill is under construction and will open by 2035, with other sections progressively opening until the full line is operational by 2050.

=== Other planned extensions ===
The State Government is currently preparing a business case for electrification and extension of the Frankston line to Baxter in Melbourne's South. The Federal Government committed $225 million towards the project in its 2017–2018 budget.

During the 2018 Victorian state election, the State Government also announced its Western Rail Plan, which would quadruplicate and electrify the rail lines to Melton and Wyndham Vale, allowing Metro services. Under this plan, Metro and V/Line regional services would be separated, allowing for higher speed trains to be introduced to Geelong and Ballarat. A new connection between Sunshine and Southern Cross Station to be built as part of the Airport rail link could add extra capacity for regional and metro lines. According to the Government, these lines could be fully electrified to Geelong and Ballarat and run at speeds of up to 250 km/h (155 mph), significantly above the 160 km/h (99 mph) limit of current V/Line VLocity trains. Planning for the fast rail and electrification of the lines to Melton and Wyndham Vale will occur alongside planning for the Airport rail link, with construction set to start by 2022.

=== Level crossing removals ===
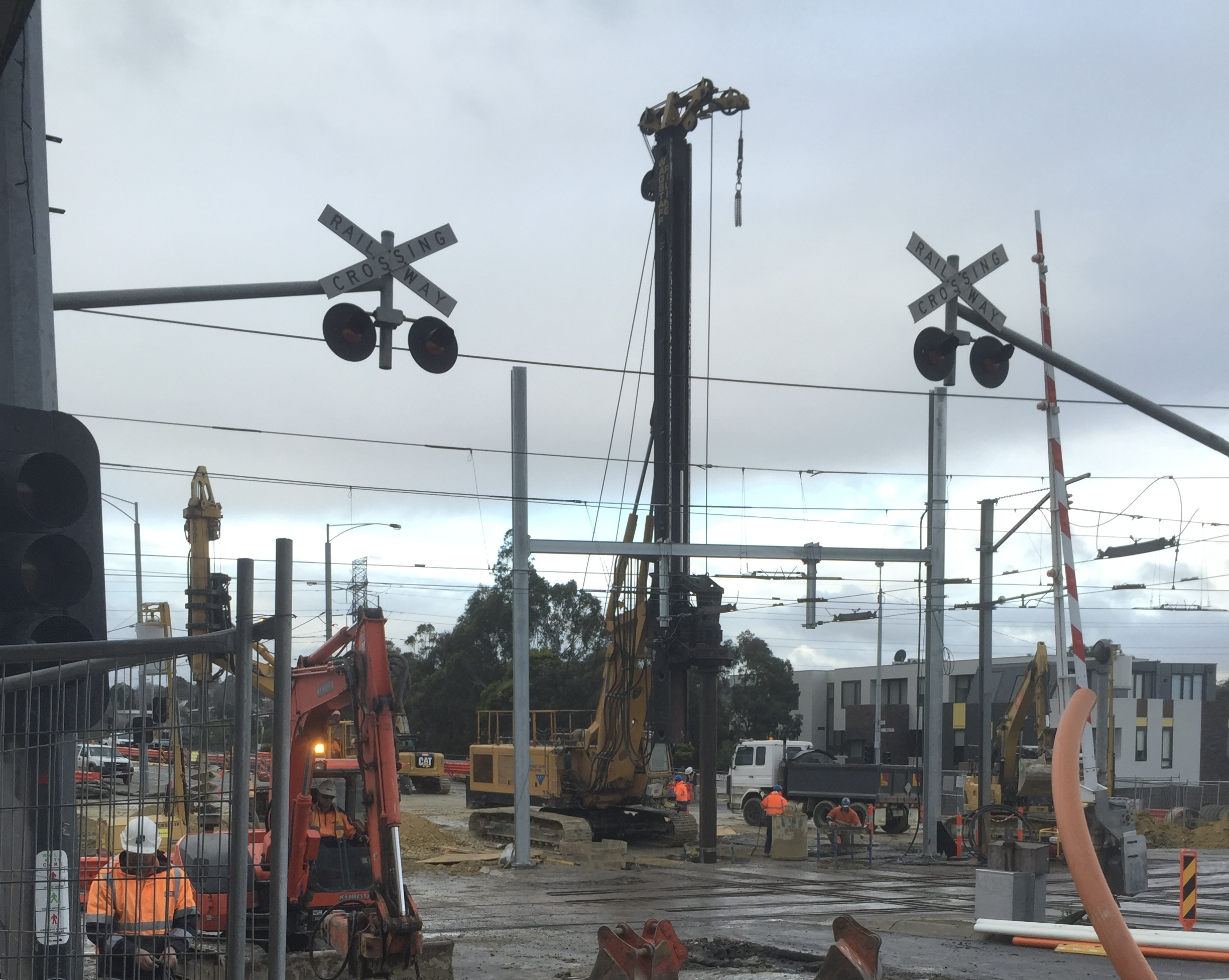
The first level crossing removal under the project taking place at Gardiner, August 2015

In 2015, the Andrews Government had announced a rail project that would oversee the removal of the remaining level crossings in metropolitan Melbourne. The key benefits of the project include:

- Improving safety
- Reducing congestion
- Improving reliability
- Increased service capacity

In 2016, the first level crossing removal was done on Burke Road, Glen Iris which resulted in a rebuild Gardiner station. By October 2026 a total of 96 level crossings were removed through various methods.

Level crossing removals by year
Year	Crossings removed	Stations rebuilt	New stations
2016	8	7	
2017	3	1	1
2018	18	7	3
2019	2	1	
2020	11	5	
2021	13	6	
2022	11	5	
2023	7	4	1
2024	10	6	1
2025	5		
2026	8	2	
Total	96	44	6

== Infrastructure ==
=== Railway ===
Route length of Melbourne rail network within the metropolitan area in km (2019)
Passenger only	220
Freight only	28
Shared passenger and freight	181
Electrified	370
Not electrified	59
Total	429

The rail network within the Melbourne metropolitan area includes dedicated passenger lines, dedicated freight lines, and lines shared by the two types of traffic. Nearly all passenger traffic and some intrastate freight operates on 1,600 mm (5 ft 3 in) Victorian broad gauge, while all interstate freight traffic operates on 1,435 mm (4 ft 8 1/2 in) standard gauge.

Most suburban passenger lines operated by the metropolitan rail franchisee, currently Metro Trains Melbourne, are electrified with 1500 V DC overhead catenary. Many of the suburban lines share tracks with regional passenger trains operated by V/Line, and some V/Line services provide "peri-urban" service to areas of Melbourne not reached by the electrified network. Metro also operates an isolated section of unelectrified passenger line between Frankston and Stony Point.

The network is centred on Flinders Street and Southern Cross stations in the CBD, which are joined directly by a six-track viaduct and indirectly by the underground four-track City Loop. From this central core, nearly all tracks pass through the three major junction stations of North Melbourne, Jolimont, and Richmond; and from there extend outwards to the west, north-east and east of the city respectively. There are few connections between the radial lines outside of the central city. Capital investment in the network since 1990 has focused on relieving "bottlenecks" near the central core caused by the large number of lines converging, most significantly with the Regional Rail Link project which provided additional capacity between Sunshine and the city.

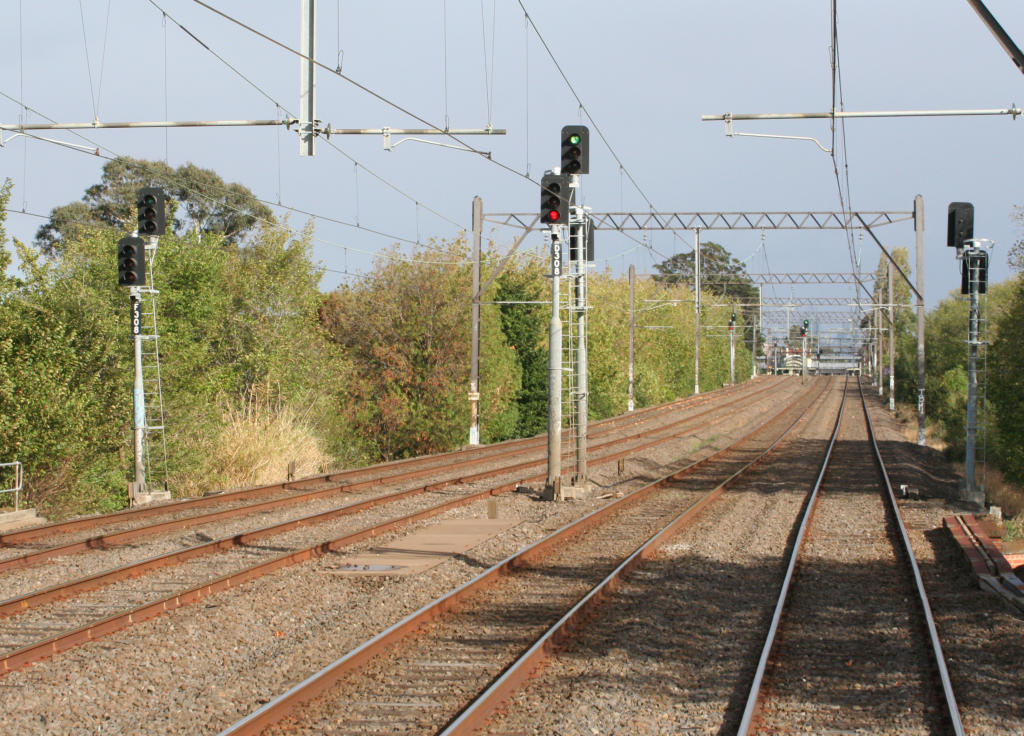
Quadruple track near Caulfield station, showing signalling and overhead wiring, January 2007

Much of the metropolitan network is double track or multiple pairs of tracks. There are small sections of triple track, which are used to allow express trains to overtake stopping trains in peak hour. Nearly the entirety of the Altona and Stony Point branches are single track, and many of the outer suburban passenger lines also have sections of single track, usually where demand for frequent services is low.

The metropolitan network has a large number of level crossings. Many have been gradually removed by grade separating road and rail traffic: by 2016, some 228 grade separations had been undertaken in the Melbourne area, leaving 170 level crossings, although very few projects of this nature had been undertaken in the latter half of the 20th century. The Level Crossing Removal Project, which began in 2014, aimed to increase the rate of level crossing removals to over 6 each year for at least 8 years, and the project was later extended for a further four years.

=== Stations ===
There are 227 stations in Melbourne, operated by Metro Trains Melbourne.

==== Host stations and premium stations ====
Host stations and premium stations are categories of railway stations on the suburban rail network. A premium station is staffed from first train to last, seven days a week, while a host station is staffed only during the morning peak on weekdays. Of the 227 stations on Melbourne's railway network, there are 82 premium stations, in addition to the five City Loop stations.

Although plans for the premium station program were unveiled in 1991 (under the guise of "Safe Stations"), the program was commenced in 1994 by the Public Transport Corporation, with Mount Waverley being the first station given premium status. By the end of 1995 the number of staffed stations increased from 35 to 51. It was proposed to upgrade further stations to premium status in the future.

The host station program was introduced by the Victorian Department of Transport in the early 2000s to ensure that over 80% of suburban rail passengers started their journey from a staffed (host or premium) station.

==== Passenger information ====
A Connex style PRIDE Talking Box panel at East Camberwell station, July 2005. These types of PRIDE boxes were installed at Melbourne stations between 2005 and 2020.

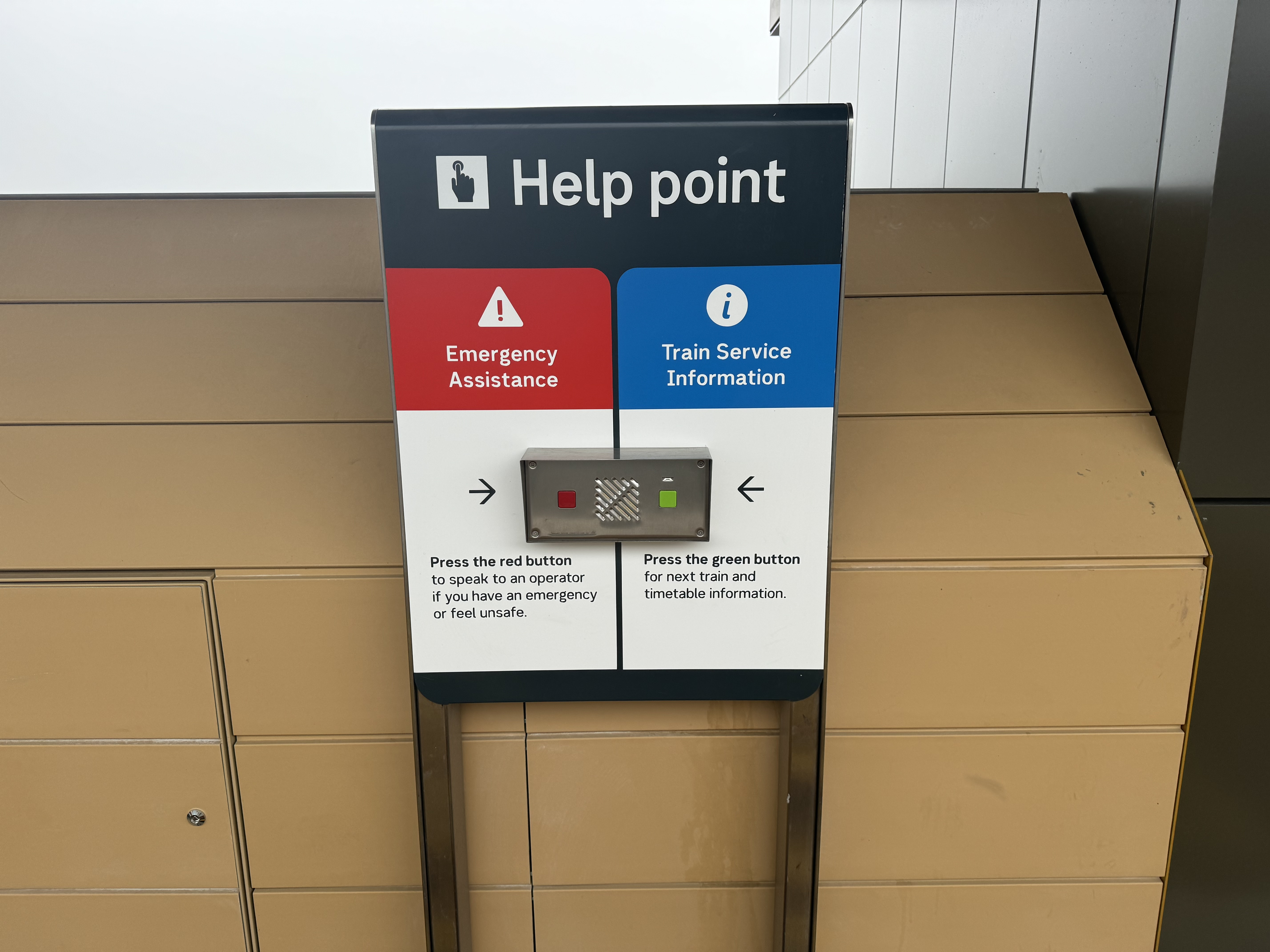
A new style Metro PRIDE Talking Box panel at Croydon station, October 2024. These types of PRIDE boxes were installed at Melbourne stations since 2020.

A diagram of a two-line LED PID

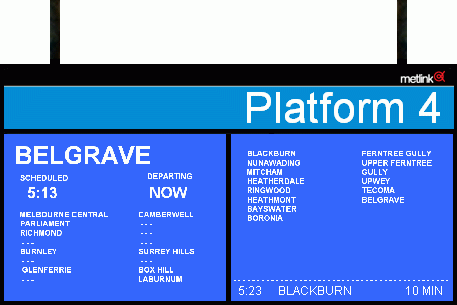
A diagram of a CRT PID screen pair (no longer in use)

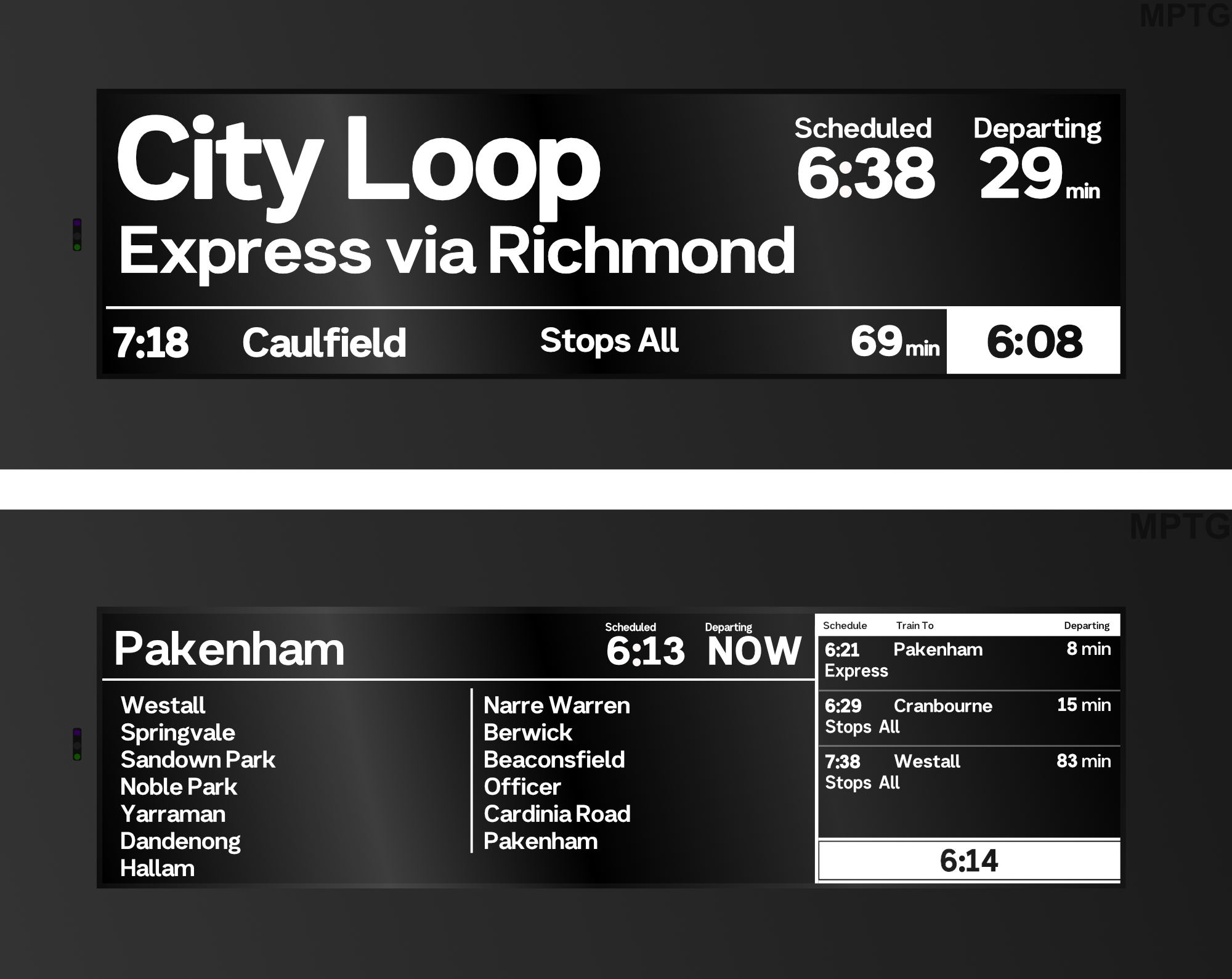
Newer style smaller black and white LCD PID commonly seen at non-city railway stations.

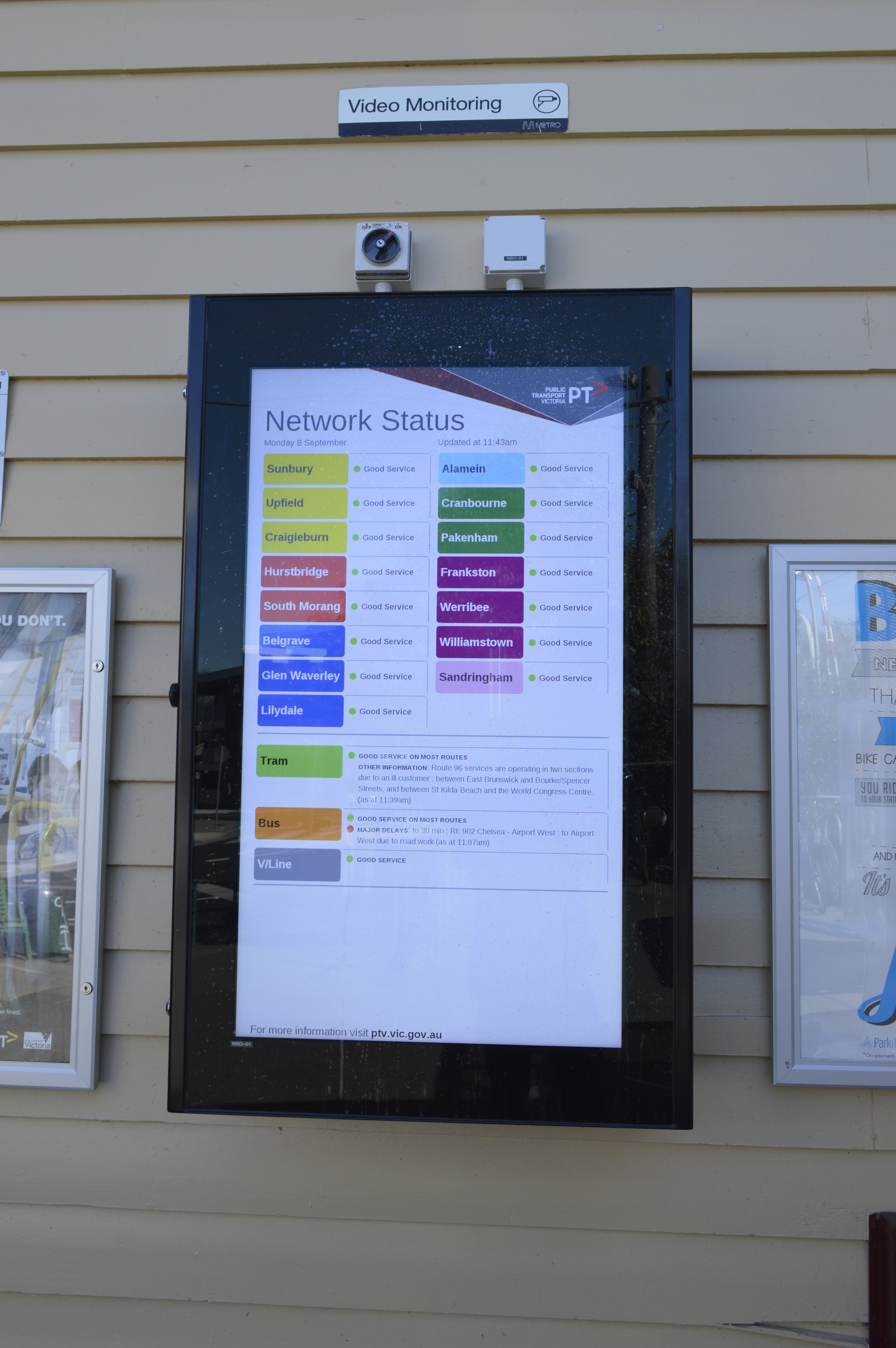
A network status board at Highett station, September 2014

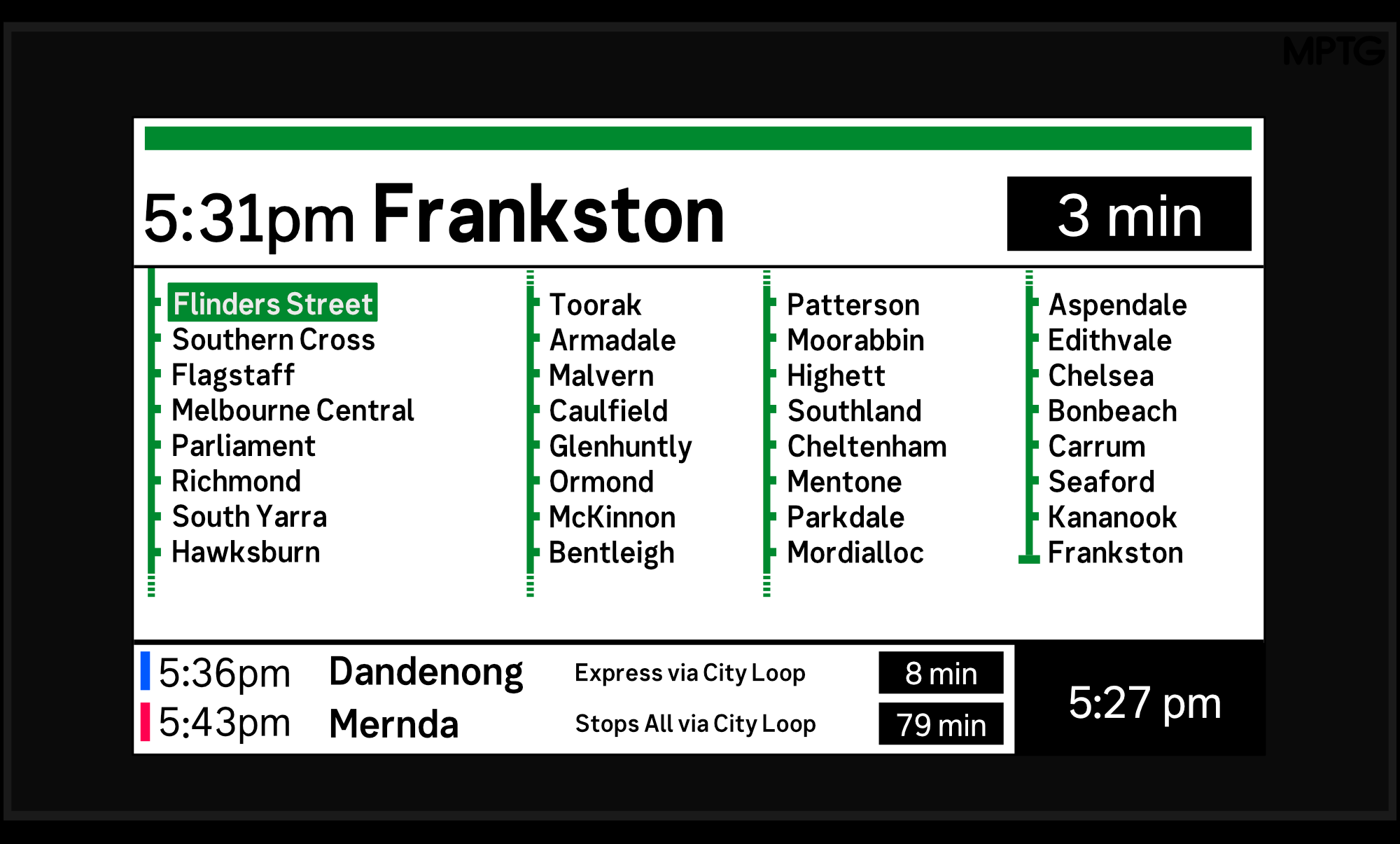
Newer style colour LCD PID used on the platforms at Flinders Street Station

Timetable information is available to passengers at stations through the PRIDE II system, which is an electronic timetable and announcement system, and stands for Passenger Real-time Information Dissemination Equipment. The system consists of:

- The control system, situated at Metrol.
- Control stations, at which staff update information, and announcements and CCTV recordings are dealt with for nearby stations.
- Public address systems at each station on the network. The PRIDE system automatically announces when a train is due soon, delayed, or cancelled; this is done via the rail telephone network.
- PRIDE "talking boxes" installed on each platform of all stations.
- Electronic passenger information displays.

Control data comes from two locations: Metrol, and control stations. Next train data and times are automatically updated by the train control systems, with manual overrides also possible.

All stations are provided with "talking boxes" which have two buttons and a small speaker. The green button, when pressed, contacts the PRIDE controller over the rail telephone network, identifying itself by the DTMF tones that correspond to the ID number assigned to the box. The system then reads out times and destinations for the next three services to depart that platform (or, in the case of stations with a single island platform with departures either side, both platforms). The red button when pressed, gives the user two way communication with the closest control station.

Busy stations are often provided with an electronic LED PIDs (Passenger Information Displays), which indicate the destination, time, stopping pattern summary, and minutes to departure for the next train on the platform.

Stations on the City Loop, in addition to North Melbourne, Richmond, and Box Hill stations, originally had CRT screen PIDs, however all of these have since been replaced by widescreen LCD screens. These displays show in detail the destination, scheduled and actual departure time, and all stations the next train stops at. Also shown is the destination and time of the following two-to-three trains, and the system is capable of providing suggested connections and warn of service interruptions.

On 26 September 2010, the PRIDE system was upgraded with new voice announcements. The voice was female, and advised passengers to touch on and off when using Myki.

As part of the Bayside Rail Upgrade, stations on the Frankston line received new "network status boards". The LCD screens provided travel information on all of Melbourne's 16 railway lines, as well as tram & bus services, including delays, replacement services or planned disruptions.

=== Signalling ===
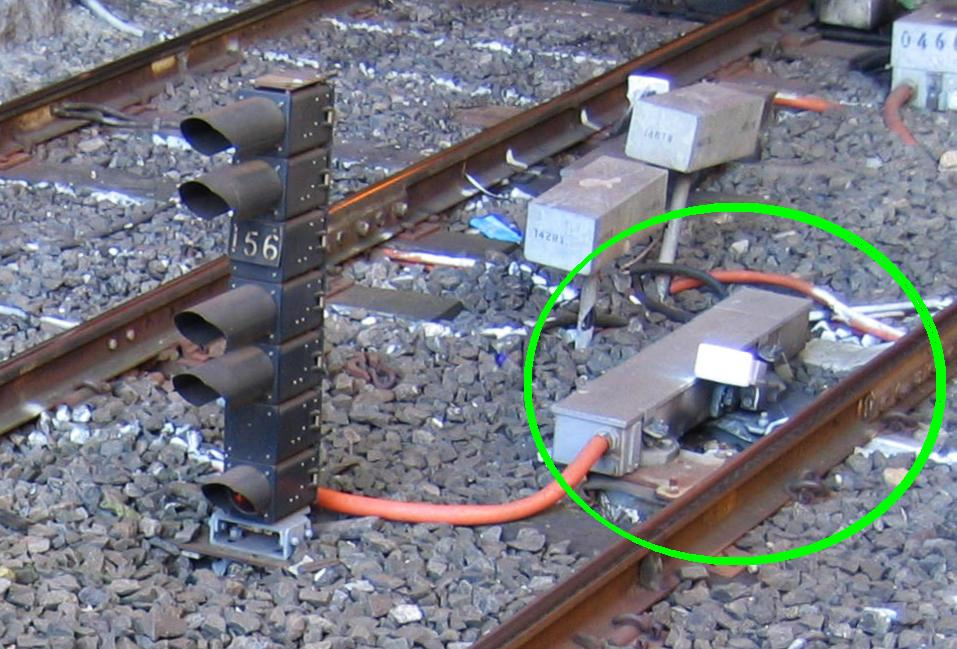
A signal with associated train stop in the raised position to the right, October 2005

Melbourne's railways were originally signalled in the British fashion, using 2-position semaphore signals; Double Line Block, Electric Staff, and Train Staff and Ticket safeworking practices. In 1915, American speed signalling (referred to as 3-position signalling) was introduced, controlled primarily through track circuits. 3-position signalling gradually supplanted 2-position signalling, with Frankston Station the only remaining 2-position location as of 2026.

CBTC was first brought into use between South Yarra and Clayton in 2024, as a component of the Metro Tunnel project. It is overlaid on top of the existing 3-position signalling in the above-ground section of the Metro Tunnel corridor between West Footscray and Clayton, and used exclusively in the tunnel itself.

Train stops are used to enforce stop indications on signals. Should a train pass a signal at danger, the train's brakes will automatically be applied. Trains are also fitted with pilot valves, a form of dead man's switch that applies the brakes should the driver fail to maintain a foot or hand pilot valve in a set position. The "VICERS" vigilance control and event recorder system is also being currently fitted to suburban trains to provide an additional level of safety.

The main control room for the rail network is Metrol. Located in the Melbourne CBD, it controls signals in the inner suburbs, tracking the location of all trains, as well as the handling the distribution of real time passenger information, and manages disruptions to the timetable. Additional signal boxes are located throughout the network, in direct communication with Metrol.

=== Terminology ===
The railways in Melbourne generally use British-derived terminology. For example:

- Up refers to the direction "towards Melbourne".
- Down refers to the direction "away from Melbourne", or "towards the country".
- Points refers to what are known as railroad switches, or crossovers in American English.
- Signal box refers to the signal control installation (tower in American terminology).
- Gunzel terminology for a railway enthusiast.

== Patronage ==
The following table lists patronage figures for the network during the corresponding financial year. Australia's financial years start on 1 July and end on 30 June. Major events that affected the number of journeys made or how patronage is measured are included as notes.

Melbourne metropolitan train patronage by financial year
2000s	Year	2000–01	2001–02	2002–03	2003–04	2004–05	2005–06	2006–07	2007–08	2008–09	2009–10
2000s	Patronage (millions)	130.3	131.8	133.8	134.9	145.1 (Note: Patronage estimates use a different methodology from 2004–05, resulting in a "step-change" in patronage estimates from 2003–04 to 2004–05.)	159.1 (Note: Figures exclude additional patronage associated with the 2006 Commonwealth Games.)	178.6	201.2	213.9	219.3
2000s	Reference										
2010s	Year	2010–11	2011–12	2012–13	2013–14	2014–15	2015–16	2016–17	2017–18	2018–19	2019–20
2010s	Patronage (millions)	228.9	222.0	225.5	232.0	227.5	233.4	236.8	240.9	243.2	187.6 (Note: Patronage was severely impacted by the COVID-19 pandemic.)
2010s	Reference										
2020s	Year	2020–21	2021–22	2022–23	2023–24	2024-25					
2020s	Patronage (millions)	81.7	99.5	157.1	182.5	187.4					
2020s	Reference										
View source data.

== Metropolitan services ==
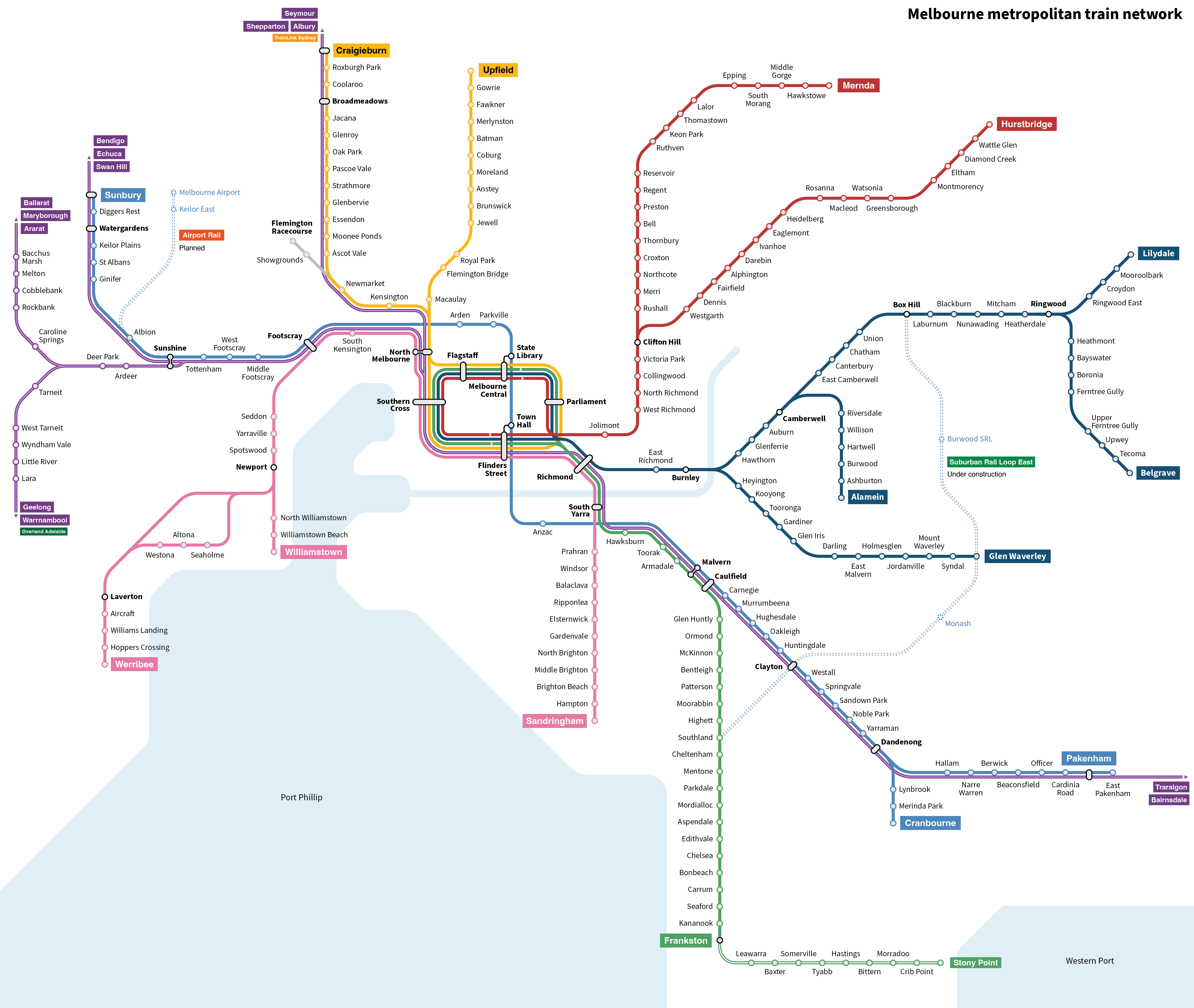
Schematic map of the Melbourne metropolitan train network showing current and under-construction lines.

=== Operations ===
Despite initially being constructed and operated as private railways in the 1850s, following the establishment of the government-owned Victorian Railways in 1858 Melbourne's suburban railway system has been state operated for the majority of its existence. In the 1920s Victorian Railways was the operator of the world's busiest railway station (Flinders Street) and one of the world's busiest railway networks. Following several high-profile collisions in the early 20th century, a number of network safety processes were implemented by the operator to improve passenger safety.

The agency name was shortened to VicRail in the early 1980s and then, later in the decade, the metropolitan system became known as Metropolitan Transit ('The Met') and the regional system became known as V/Line. In preparation for privatisation the suburban system was split into Bayside Trains and Hillside Trains by the Kennett Ministry in 1998. Privatisation was completed in 1999 and M-Train and Connex Melbourne won the tender to operate Bayside, and Hillside trains, respectively. Following M>Train's inability to renegotiate financial arrangements, in 2004 Connex Melbourne assumed responsibility for the entire network. Current operations are provided by Metro Trains Melbourne, an MTR Corporation joint venture.

Operator timelines

Melbourne and Hobson's Bay Railway Company (1853–1865)
Geelong and Melbourne Railway Company (1853–1860)
Melbourne, Mount Alexander and Murray River Railway Company (1853–1856)
Victorian Railways (1856–1983)
Melbourne and Suburban Railway Company (1857–1862)
MRC
St Kilda and Brighton Railway Company (1857–1862)
Melbourne and Essendon Railway Company (1859–1867)
Melbourne Railway Company (1862–1865)
Melbourne and Hobson's Bay United Railway Company (1865–1878)
Deniliquin and Moama Railway Company (1874–1923)
← Only train (14 Nov 1888)
Rosstown Railway (1875–1904~1916)
?? (Grampians railway line) (1882–1905)
VR
Altona Beach Estates (1887–1923)
Shires of Swan Hill/Kerang (Kerang–Koondrook Tramway) (1889–1952)
Yarrawonga Shire Council (Katamatite Tramway) (1890–1892)
│
1853
│
1863
│
1873
│
1883
│
1893
│
1903
│
1913
│
1923
│
1933
│
1943
│
1953
First 100 years
No operations · Operations · Operations by another company
All but the Rosstown Railway eventually became part of the Victorian Railways

Operators: government-owned & onwards
1st government-owned Pre 1983	Metropolitan/State Transport Authority (MTA/STA) 1983–1989	Public Transport Corporation (PTC) 1989–1998	PTC (pre privatisation split) 1997–1999	Privatisation & onwards Post 1999		
Victorian Railways (VR): 1856–1974 VR as VicRail: 1974–1983	STA as V/Line: 1983–1989	PTC as The Met: 1989–1998 PTC as V/Line: 1989–1995 PTC as V/Line Passenger: 1995–1998 PTC as V/Line Freight: 1995–1997	V/Line Passenger; 1998–1999	National Express as V/Line Passenger: 1999–2002	V/Line Passenger; 2002–Current	
Victorian Railways (VR): 1856–1974 VR as VicRail: 1974–1983	STA as V/Line: 1983–1989	PTC as The Met: 1989–1998 PTC as V/Line: 1989–1995 PTC as V/Line Passenger: 1995–1998 PTC as V/Line Freight: 1995–1997	V/Line Freight; 1997–1999	Freight Victoria; 1999–2000	Freight Australia; 2000–2004	Pacific National; 2004–Current
Victorian Railways (VR): 1856–1974 VR as VicRail: 1974–1983	MTA as The Met: 1983–1989	PTC as The Met: 1989–1998 PTC as V/Line: 1989–1995 PTC as V/Line Passenger: 1995–1998 PTC as V/Line Freight: 1995–1997	Bayside Trains § 1998–1999	National Express as M>Train §: 2000–2004	Connex Melbourne; 2004–2009	Metro Trains Melbourne; 2009–Current
Victorian Railways (VR): 1856–1974 VR as VicRail: 1974–1983	MTA as The Met: 1983–1989	PTC as The Met: 1989–1998 PTC as V/Line: 1989–1995 PTC as V/Line Passenger: 1995–1998 PTC as V/Line Freight: 1995–1997	Hillside Trains †: 1998–1999	Connex Melbourne †; 2000–2004	Connex Melbourne; 2004–2009	Metro Trains Melbourne; 2009–Current

§Bayside Trains / M>Train – Caulfield and Northern groups
†Hillside Trains / Connex (2000–2004) – Clifton Hill and Burnley groups, Showgrounds services

=== Fleet ===
==== Current fleet ====
The majority of the current suburban train fleet in Melbourne is owned by VicTrack, with the train operator (currently Metro Trains Melbourne) responsible for maintaining the fleet. All trains on the Melbourne suburban network are electric and driver-only operated. Guards on suburban trains were discontinued between 1993 and 1995.

All trains are fitted with power-operated sliding doors which are closed by the driver, but opened by passengers. The doors of newer model HCMT, X'Trapolis and Siemens trains are opened electronically with a button, whilst Comeng trains are slid manually using handles. Trains are fitted with air conditioning, closed-circuit cameras, and emergency intercom systems. Trains are fixed into three car units and may operate alone or in pairs, except for the HCMT trains which run in singular seven car sets.

Name	Image	Alternative name	Entered service	Number built	Key information
Comeng			1981–1989	100 (3 carriage)	Named as a "Commonwealth Engineering" portmanteau. Refurbished 2000–2003 by EDI Rail and Alstom and Life Extension refurbishment in 2017-2021. Feature power operated doors that must be pulled open by hand but are closed automatically by the driver. First trains to feature air conditioning. Will be replaced by X'Trapolis 2.0 and High Capacity Metro Trains.
X'Trapolis 100		X'Traps	2002–2004; 2009–2020	211 (3 carriage)	Body shells built in France, remaining assembled in Ballarat. Eight separate orders have been lodged for X'Trapolis trains. Remodelled since 2009 with 2+2 seat configurations to increase passenger capacity/flow.
Siemens Nexas			2003–2006	72 (3 carriage)	Refurbished with seat removals and extra railings since 2016. The first openly articulated trains with passengers able to move between carriages without opening any doors. Frequent overrunning caused lawsuits and disruptions to fix alleged braking faults.
High Capacity Metro Train		HCMT	2020–2024	70 (7 carriage)	Currently on use on the Pakenham, Cranbourne and Sunbury lines. Has run on the Metro Tunnel since 30 November 2025 and ceased using the City Loop on 1 February 2026. Will expand to the Airport line around 2033. Built in Changchun, China and Victoria using 60% local content.
X'Trapolis 2.0		XT2	2026–	9 (41 under construction, 6 carriage)	Replacing Comeng fleets, will be used on Craigieburn and Frankston and Upfield lines. Entered service on the Upfield Line on 3 May 2026.
Sprinter			1993–1995	22	Leased from V/Line for use on the Stony Point line

==== Maintenance fleet ====
Name	Image	Alternative name	Entered service	Number built	Key information
P class		P class	1984	9	Leased from Southern Shorthaul Railroad.
EV120	EV120 at Riversdale Station	Evie	2021	1	Replaced IEV100 and IEV102 fleet.
ECOM		Evette	2025	2 (converted)	Former Comeng sets converted to haul EV120.

==== Former fleet ====
Name	Image	Alternative name	Entered service	Exited service	Number built	Key information
Swing Door		Dog Box, Doggies	1887	c.1959–1970	294	Named after the outward swinging carriage doors. Converted to electric traction from 1917.
Tait		Reds, Red Rattlers	1910	1974–1984	623	Named after Sir Thomas James Tait, Chairman of Commissioners of the Victorian Railways. Converted to electric traction from 1919. Banned from the City Loop due to the fire hazard of wooden frames.
Harris		Blues, Greasers	1956	1988–1989	436	Named after Norman Charles Harris, Chairman of Commissioners of the Victorian Railways. Most contained asbestos and were buried in Clayton in the 1980s; 16 were refurbished between 1982 and 1988 (see below), 49 vehicles were converted to H type carriages for shorter distance country services. Three motors preserved; one as static exhibits at Newport Railway Museum, and two pending restoration at Newport Workshops.
Hitachi		Martin & King, Stainless Steel	1972	2003–2014	118 × 3 carriage sets	Named due to the design by Hitachi, air conditioning. Three Hitachi motor carriages form part of the restaurant Easey's in Collingwood.
Refurbished Harris		Grey Ghosts	1982	1990–1994	16	Refurbished from the original Harris vehicles between 1982 and 1988 (see above). 10 vehicles were converted to H type carriages for shorter distance country services. One motor preserved as static exhibit at Newport Railway Museum.
4D		Double Deck Development and Demonstration	1992	2002	1 × 4 carriage set	Prototype double deck train. Withdrawn 2002, stored at Ringwood Sidings then Newport Workshops. Scrapped 2006.

=== Lines ===
==== Electrified lines ====
Melbourne's metropolitan network includes 16 electrified suburban lines. Many lines have been lengthened over time, most notably the Mernda line from Epping to South Morang in 2012 and again to Mernda in 2018. Lines have also changed terminus or layout, including the 2025 changes to the Cranbourne, Pakenham and Sunbury lines as part of the Melbourne Metro Rail Project. Numerous proposals for new lines or extensions not yet constructed have been made, including the long-outstanding Doncaster railway line and Rowville railway line.

Line	First Service	Image	Length	Stations	Rolling stock
Alamein	1898		14.9 km (9.3 mi)	18	X'Trapolis 100
Belgrave	1889		41.8 km (26 mi)	31	X'Trapolis 100
Craigieburn	1860		27 km (16.8 mi)	18	Comeng; Siemens Nexas; X'Trapolis 2.0
Cranbourne	1888		43.92 km (27.29 mi)	24	High Capacity Metro Train
Flemington Racecourse	1861		7.8 km (4.84 mi)	5	Comeng; Siemens Nexas
Frankston	1881		43.23 km (26.86 mi)	28	Comeng; Siemens Nexas; X'Trapolis 100; X'Trapolis 2.0
Glen Waverley	1861		21.3 km (13.2 mi)	20	X'Trapolis 100
Hurstbridge	1888		36.7 km (22.8 mi)	24	X'Trapolis 100
Lilydale	1882		37.8 km (23.5 mi)	27	X'Trapolis 100
Mernda	1889		33.1 km (20.6 mi)	25	X'Trapolis 100
Pakenham	1877		56.9 km (35.4 mi)	27	High Capacity Metro Train
Sandringham	1859		18.09 km (11.24 mi)	14	Comeng; Siemens Nexas
Sunbury	1921		40.3 km (25 mi)	16	High Capacity Metro Train
Upfield	1884		20.1 km (12.5 mi)	14	Comeng; Siemens Nexas; X'Trapolis 2.0
Werribee	1859		32.9 km (20.4 mi)	17	Comeng; Siemens Nexas; X'Trapolis 100
Williamstown	1859		16.2 km (10.1 mi)	12	Comeng; Siemens Nexas; X'Trapolis 100

==== Non-electrified lines ====
Melton services are operated by V/Line and depart from Southern Cross, but are within the metropolitan ticketing zone. Stony Point services operate as shuttles from Frankston station to Stony Point station. It is the only non-electrified line operated by Metro Trains. It is operated using Sprinter diesel multiple units leased from V/Line. Wyndham Vale services are operated by V/Line and depart from Southern Cross, but are within the metropolitan ticketing zone.

Line	First Service	Image	Length	Stations	Rolling stock
Melton	2015		41.3 km (25.66 mi)	9	VLocity
Stony Point	1888		31 km (19 mi)	10	Sprinter
Wyndham Vale	2015		40.3 km (25.04 mi)	5	VLocity

=== Services ===
Metropolitan train services are operated by Metro Trains Melbourne.

Services are grouped as follows:

- Burnley group (dark blue)
  - Lilydale, Belgrave, Alamein and Glen Waverley lines.
- Caulfield group (green)
  - Frankston line.
  - Stony Point line.
- Clifton Hill group (red)
  - Mernda and Hurstbridge lines.
- Cross-City group (pink)
  - Werribee, Williamstown and Sandringham lines.
- Northern group (yellow)
  - Craigieburn and Upfield lines.
- Yarra group (light blue)
  - Cranbourne, Pakenham and Sunbury lines.
- Special services (grey)
  - Flemington Racecourse line.

Most lines run through the City Loop when arriving at Melbourne CBD, with the Metro Tunnel Group (running through the Metro Tunnel) and Cross-City Group (running across the Flinders Street Viaduct) as notable exceptions. The Clifton Hill Group runs clockwise all day and the Caulfield Group runs anti-clockwise all day. The Burnley Group runs anti-clockwise in the morning and switches to clockwise in the afternoon. The Northern Group runs clockwise in the morning and anti-clockwise on the afternoon.

Melbourne uses clock-face scheduling in off-peak periods, but generally not in rush hour, due to the network operating near to infrastructure capacity and having to accommodate single-line sections, flat junctions, and regional diesel-hauled trains. Frequencies vary according to time of day, day of week and by line. In some places, usually interchange stations, services on two lines combine to provide more frequent services on common sections of tracks. All services become 24-hour from Friday morning to Sunday evening, with at least one departure every hour after 12am.

Along with other Australian railways, Melbourne uses the British terminology of "up" and "down", with "up" being defined as toward Flinders Street station in the CBD.

=== Fares and tickets ===
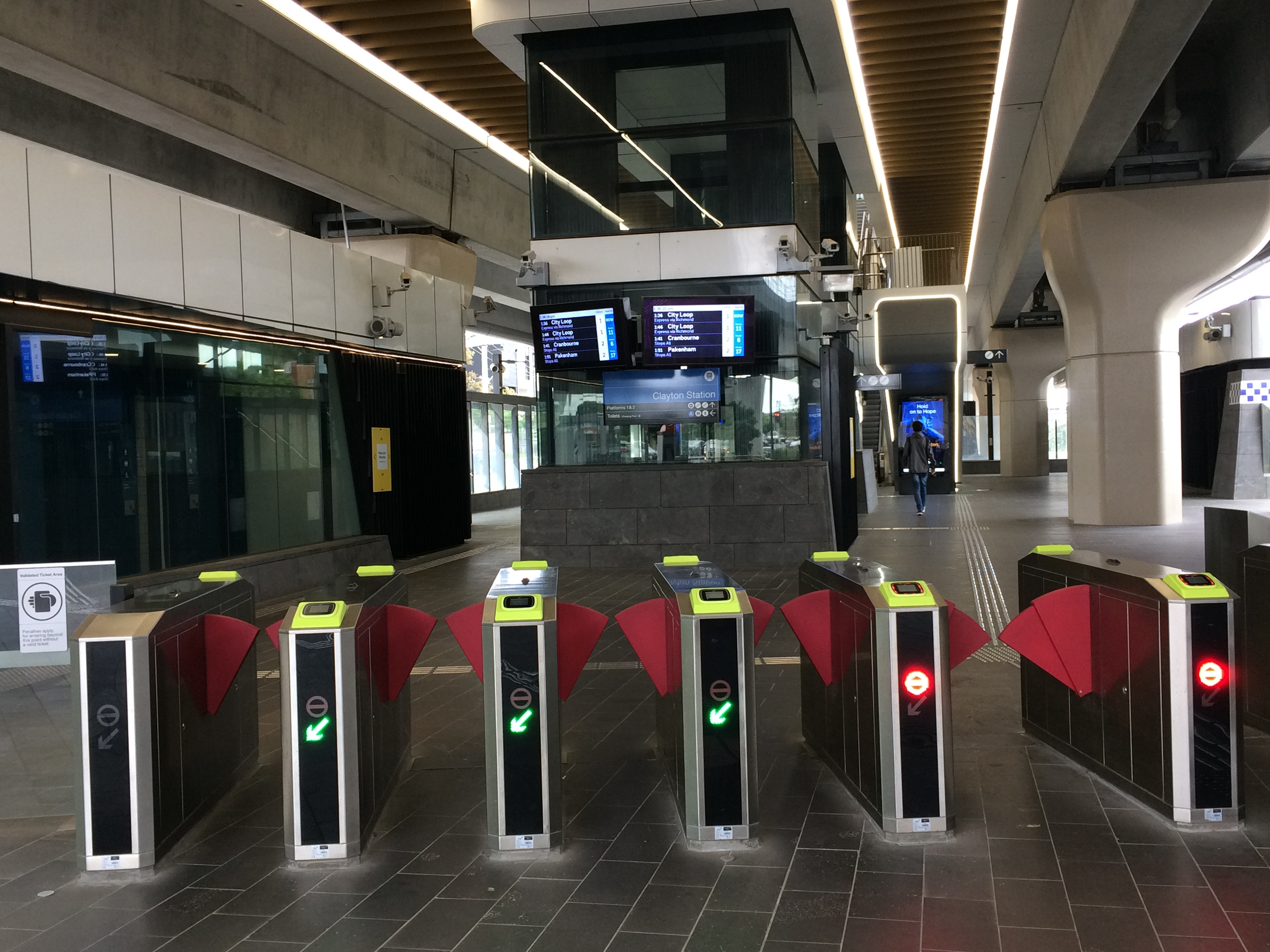
Myki fare gates at Clayton station in January 2021.

The myki smart-card ticketing system is the main ticketing system currently in use across Melbourne, introduced in 2010. Prior to December 2012 Melbourne also used a magnetic strip paper ticket system known as the Metcard, first introduced to the railway network in 1996. On 29 December 2012 Metcard was no longer available for use on Melbourne's public transport and completely replaced by myki. Multi-modal tickets were first introduced in Melbourne in 1969 and prior to this train, tram and bus services all had separated ticketing systems.

== Regional services ==
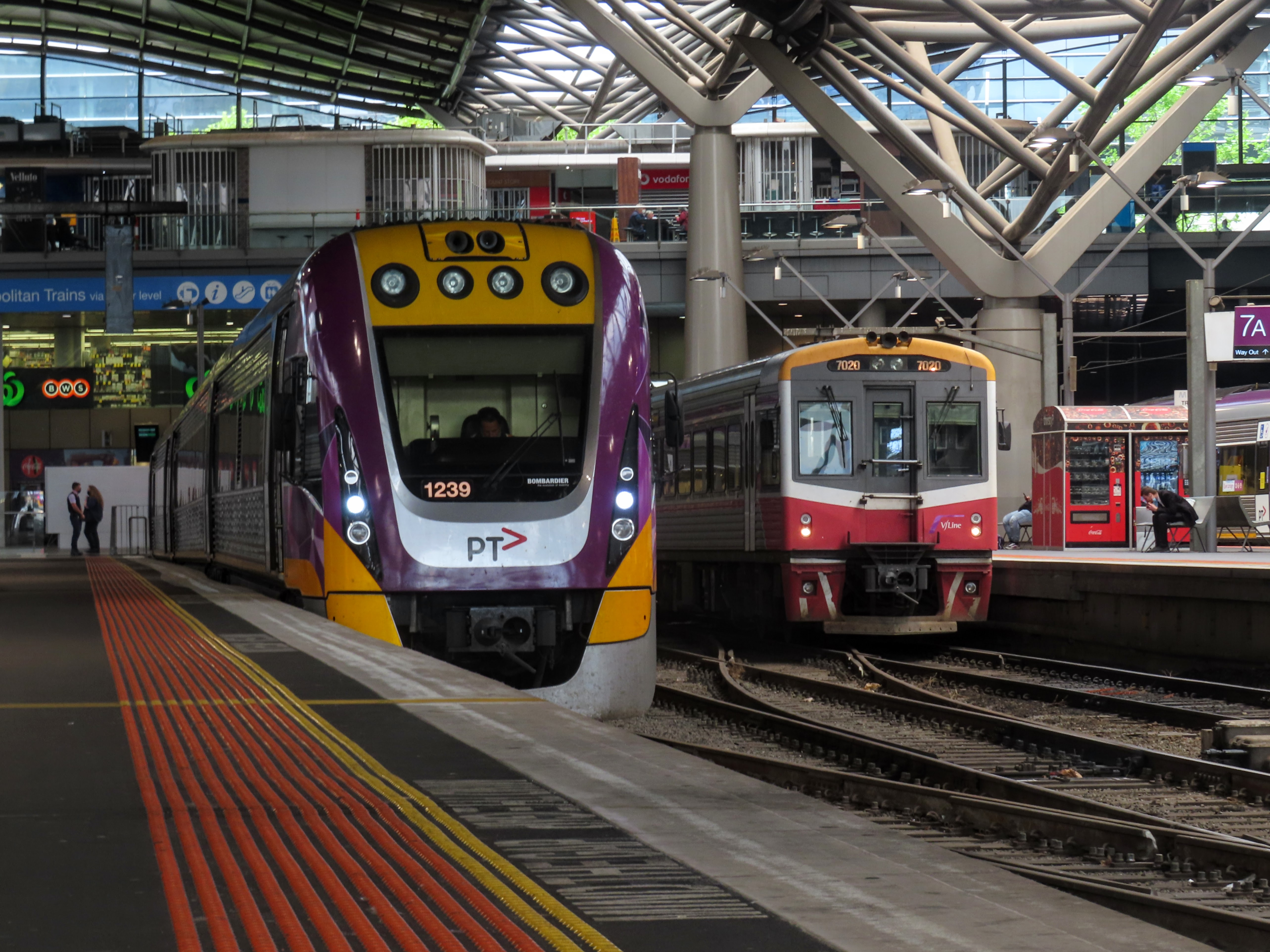
VLocity and Sprinter DMUs await their departure from Melbourne's Southern Cross in January 2021

V/Line regional services share tracks with several suburban train lines from the outskirts of Melbourne to the regional railway terminus at Southern Cross station (with the Traralgon V/Line rail service terminating at Flinders Street station). The Pakenham line has the longest shared track section which is used by V/Line services to Traralgon and Bairnsdale. The Sunbury and Craigieburn lines also share lesser sections of track with counterpart regional lines.

The Regional Rail Link project separated suburban services from regional trains on the Ballarat, Bendigo and Geelong lines. A ceremonial start of construction was held in August 2009 and the project was completed in June 2015.

== Freight services ==
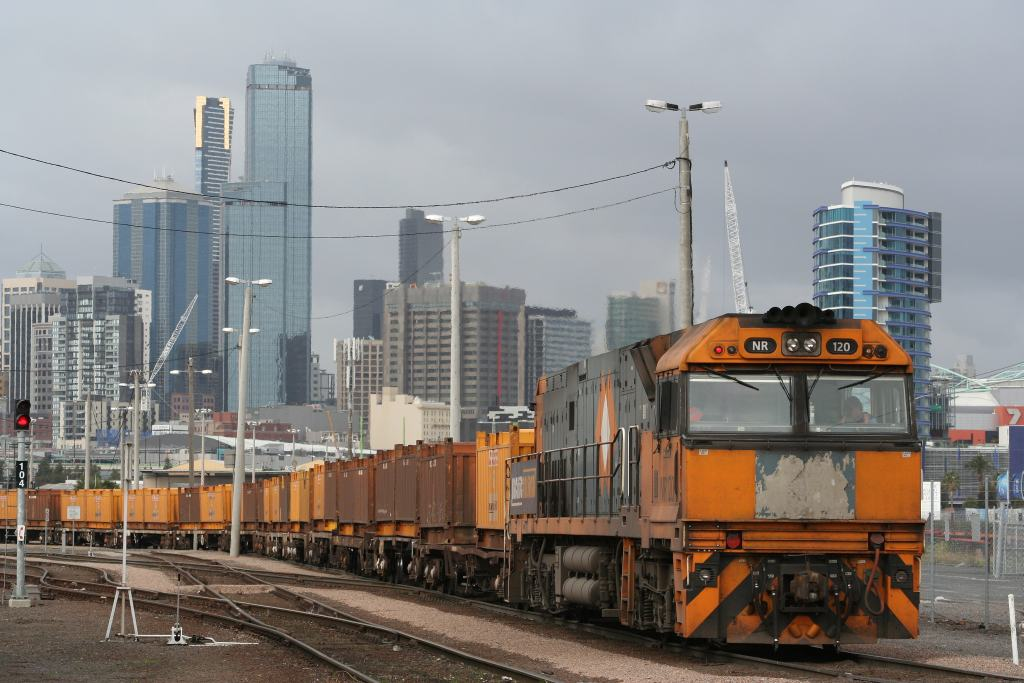
NR class locomotive at the Melbourne Steel Terminal, off Footscray Road in June 2006

Melbourne also has an extensive network of railway lines and yards to serve freight traffic. These freight lines are of two gauges—1,600 mm (5 ft 3 in) broad gauge and 1,435 mm (4 ft 8 1/2 in) standard gauge, and are not electrified. In the inner western suburbs of the city, freight trains operate on dedicated lines, but in other areas freight trains share tracks with the suburban Metro Trains Melbourne and regional V/Line passenger services. The majority of freight terminals are located in the inner suburbs around Port of Melbourne, others are located between the Melbourne CBD and Footscray.

Until the 1980s a number of suburban stations had their own goods yards, with freight trains running over the suburban network, often with the E or L class electric locomotives.

== Heritage services and preservation ==
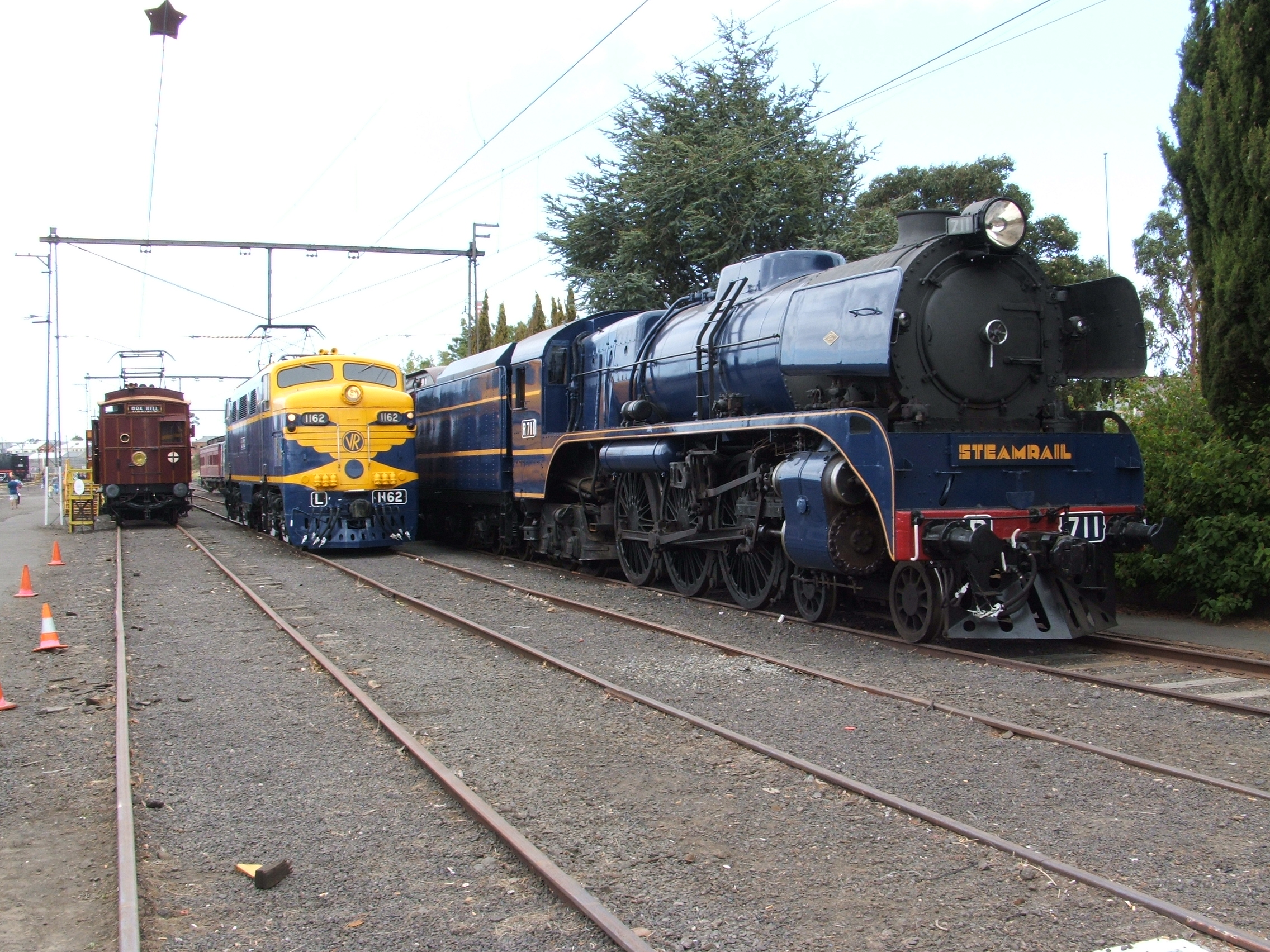
2007 open day at the Steamrail Victoria depot: R 711 beside an L class electric locomotive and Swing Door suburban train, March 2007

Melbourne also has 3 tourist railways, 3 main line heritage operators, and 1 railway museum.

Organised railway preservation commenced in Victoria with the formation of the Puffing Billy Preservation Society in 1955, and operating under the Emerald Tourist Railway Board from 1977. Formed to operate the narrow gauge 2 ft 6 in (760 mm) gauge railway in the Dandenong Ranges near Melbourne, the group continues to operate the railway today.

The demise of the last of the steam locomotives in Victoria commenced in the 1960s, with the Australian Railway Historical Society and Association of Railway Enthusiasts working with the Victorian Railways to have a number of locomotives preserved for the future. In 1962 the Australian Railway Historical Society Museum was established at Williamstown North to house static exhibits, and Steamrail Victoria was formed in 1965 to assist in the restoration of locomotives and carriages for use on special trains.

- 707 Operations, Newport
- DERMPAV (Diesel Electric Rail Motor Preservation Association of Victoria), Newport
- Puffing Billy Railway, Belgrave
- Mornington Railway, Mornington
- Newport Railway Museum, Newport
- Steamrail Victoria, Newport
- Yarra Valley Railway, Healesville

== Legislation, governance and access ==
=== Key statutes ===
The prime rail statute in Victoria is the Transport Integration Act. The Act establishes the Department of Transport as the integration agency for Victoria's transport system. The Act also establishes and sets the charters of the state agencies charged with providing public transport rail services and managing network access for freight services, namely the Director of Public Transport and V/Line. In addition, the Act creates VicTrack which owns the public rail network and associated infrastructure. Another important statute is the Rail Management Act 1996 which confers powers on rail operators and provides for a rail access scheme for the state's rail network.

=== Safety ===
==== Regulation ====
The safety of rail operations in Melbourne is regulated by the Rail Safety Act 2006 which applies to all commercial passenger and freight operations as well as tourist and heritage railways. The Act creates a framework containing safety duties for all rail industry participants and requires rail operators who manage infrastructure and rolling stock to obtain accreditation prior to commencing operations. Accredited rail operators are also required to have a safety management system to guide their operations.

Sanctions applying to the safety scheme established under the Rail Safety Act are contained in the Transport (Compliance and Miscellaneous) Act 1983. The safety regulator for the rail system in Melbourne is the Director, Transport Safety (trading as Transport Safety Victoria) whose office is established under the Transport Integration Act 2010.

==== Investigation ====
Rail operators in Victoria can also be the subject of no blame investigations conducted by the Chief Investigator, Transport Safety or the Australian Transport Safety Bureau(ATSB). The Chief Investigator is charged by the Transport Integration Act with conducting investigations into rail safety matters including incidents and trends. ATSB, on the other hand, has jusridiction over the same matters where they occur on the Defined Interstate Rail Network.

=== Ticketing and conduct ===
Ticketing requirements for public transport in Melbourne are mainly contained in the Transport (Ticketing) Regulations 2006 and the Victorian Fares and Ticketing Manual. Rules about safe and fair conduct on trains and trams in Melbourne are generally contained in the Transport (Compliance and Miscellaneous) Act 1983 and the Transport (Conduct) Regulations 2005. If Metro does not reach its Punctuality and Delivery goals they will give out compensation to eligible customers. In the month of December 2014, Metro Trains had a delivery rate of 98.5%, and a Punctuality rate of 93.60%. In 2014, Metro Trains were accused of not stopping at underpopulated suburbs' stations in order to arrive on time, this practise has been condemned by the general public and the media. They have offered compensation to affected passengers.

=== Tourist and heritage railways ===
Tourist and Heritage Railways in Melbourne and Victoria are currently governed by provisions in the Transport (Compliance and Miscellaneous) Act 1983. In future, they will be regulated by the recently enacted Tourist and Heritage Railways Act 2010, which commenced in October 2011.

== Further reading and reviews ==
- A review of Melbourne's Rail Franchising reforms Currie, Graham (2009) Journeys, Singapore Land Transit Authority Academy
- Refranchising Melbourne's metropolitan train and tram networks Deloitte Touche Thomatsu (2007), Department of Infrastructure
- The reliability of Melbourne's trains 1993–2007 Mees, Dr. Paul (2007); University of Melbourne Urban Planning Program paper
- Churchman, Geoffrey B. (1995). Railway Electrification in Australia and New Zealand. Sydney & Wellington: IPL Books. pp. 44–69. ISBN 0-908876-79-3.
