= Tic (disambiguation) =

A tic is a sudden, repetitive, nonrhythmic movement or sound.

Tic or TIC may also refer to:

== Businesses and organizations ==
- Technology Innovation Centre, at Birmingham City University
- Telecommunication Infrastructure Company of I.R.Iran
- Tyne Improvement Commission of Tyne and Wear, England

== People ==
- Tic Forrester (1896–1970), a U.S. Representative from Georgia
- Tic Price (b. 1955), a college basketball coach
- Tic (musician), Ghanaian musician

== Science, technology, and mathematics ==
- Thermal imaging camera
- Titanium carbide, chemical formula TiC
- Total inorganic carbon, a composition characteristic of liquid and solid material samples
- Total ion current, a type of mass chromatogram
- Trauma-induced coagulopathy
- Trusted Internet Connection
- Truncated cube, a polyhedron
- TESS Input Catalog, a star catalog

== Other uses ==
- Testing, inspection and certification refers to the economic sector of conformity assessment bodies
- Tenancy in common, in property law, a form of concurrent estate
- Treasury International Capital, a set of US Treasury reports
- Jockey Club Ti-I College, a secondary school in Hong Kong
- Tinak Airport, Marshall Islands (by IATA code)
- Tongue-in-cheek abbreviation

== See also ==
- Tick (disambiguation)
- Tik (disambiguation)
