= Ticking =

Ticking may refer to:

- Ticking (sound), a sharp, rhythmic sound
- Ticking (textile), a kind of textile
- "Ticking" (song), song by Elton John on the 1974 album, Caribou
- The Ticking, a 2006 comic book by Renée French
- White ticking, or rabicano, a kind of horse coat color pattern
- Ticking, a hip-hop dance technique involving staccato movements

== See also ==
- Ticking time bomb scenario, a thought experiment in ethics
- Ticking doradito (Pseudocolopteryx citreola), a species of bird in the flycatcher family
- Tick (disambiguation)
- Tick tock (disambiguation)
- Tickling
