= Tik =

Tik or TIK may refer to:

- Tik, a Greek dance better known as the horon (dance)
- TIK (band), a Ukrainian folk rock band
- Methamphetamine colloquially known in South Africa as "tik"
- Tiu Keng Leng station, Hong Kong, station code
- TiK, a messaging program
- Tigh Siah, Hormozgan, a village in Hormozgan Province, Iran
- "Tik Tok" (song), by Kesha
- Tinker Air Force Base, IATA and FAA location identifier

== See also ==
- Tick (disambiguation)
- Tic (disambiguation)
