= Ticket =

Ticket or tickets may refer to:

== Slips of paper ==
- Lottery ticket
- Parking ticket, a ticket confirming that the parking fee was paid (and the time of the parking start)
- Toll ticket, a slip of paper used to indicate where vehicles entered a toll road to charge based on an established rate when they exit
- Traffic ticket, a notice issued by a law enforcement official accusing violation of traffic laws

=== Admission ===
- Ticket (admission) (entrance ticket), a card or slip of paper used to gain admission to a location or event
- Electronic ticket, an electronic form of a transport ticket, entrance ticket etc.

==== Transport ====
- Airline ticket, a document created by an airline or a travel agent to confirm that an individual has purchased a seat on an airplane
- Train ticket, a document issued by a railway operator that enables the bearer to travel by train

== Entertainment ==
=== Film ===
- Ticket (1985 film), a film produced by Im Kwon Taek
- Ticket (2017 film), a comedy drama film
- Tickets (film), a 2005 film

=== Music ===
- "Tickets" (song), a song by Maroon 5 from their album Overexposed

=== Broadcast media ===
- KTCK, AM 1310 & FM 104.1, a radio station in Dallas, Texas, USA, known as "The Ticket"
- WXYT-FM, a sports radio station in Detroit, Michigan, USA, known as "97-1 The Ticket"

== Other uses ==
- Ticket (election), a single election choice which fills more than one political office or seat
- Ticket (IT security), a number generated by a network server as a means of authentication
- Ticket, a file in an issue tracking system documenting a reported problem and the steps taken to resolve it
- Ticket cases, a series of cases in contract law
- Tickets also known as Tix, a former online currency in the massively multiplayer online game Roblox

== See also ==
- Tick (disambiguation)
- Stub (disambiguation)
