= Tick fever =

Tick fever may refer to:

- African tick fever; see Spirochaeta duttoni
- Bovine Babesiosis
- Ruminant Anaplasmosis
- Colorado tick fever
- Equine piroplasmosis
- Sheep tick fever; see Lyme disease
- Tick-borne disease
