= Treasury International Capital =

U.S. Statistical Release

Treasury International Capital (TIC) is a set of monthly and quarterly statistical reports from the U.S. Treasury that shows nearly all the flows of money into and out of the U.S., for purchases and sales of U.S. securities and financial instruments by institutions, governments, central banks, corporations and many other entities. This includes short and long term transactions, such as stocks, bonds, derivatives, currencies, options, forwards, swaps, bank transactions, and other cross-border transactions.
