= List of former Australian railway companies =

This is a list of former railway operating companies operating in Australia. For former Government authorities, see List of former government railway authorities of Australia.

== National ==
- Australian Railroad Group
- Freight Australia
- QR National

== New South Wales ==
- CityRail
- State Rail Authority
- CountryLink
- Sydney Railway Company
- Rosehill Railway Company
- Silverton Tramway Company
- South Maitland Railway
- National Rail Corporation
- Brown's Richmond Vale Railway

== Queensland ==
- Aramac Tramway – 1913–1975, run by shire council

== South Australia ==
- South Australian Railways

== Tasmania ==
- Emu Bay Railway
- Launceston and Western Railway
- Mount Lyell Mining and Railway Company
- North Mount Lyell Railway
- Tasmanian Main Line Company

== Victoria ==
- Connex Melbourne (Hillside Trains)
- M>Train (Bayside Trains)
- V/Line Freight
- Freight Victoria
- Geelong and Melbourne Railway Company
- Great Northern Rail Services
- Kerang-Koondrook Tramway
- Melbourne and Hobson's Bay Railway Company
- Melbourne and Suburban Railway Company
- Melbourne, Mount Alexander and Murray River Railway Company
- Melbourne Railway Company
- Powelltown Tramway
- St Kilda and Brighton Railway Company
- West Coast Railway

== Western Australia ==
- Great Southern Railway
- Midland Railway of Western Australia

== See also ==
- History of rail transport in Australia
- Rail transport in Australia
