= South Australian Railways F class =

South Australian Railways F class may refer to:

- South Australian Railways F class (1869), 4-4-0T steam locomotives
- South Australian Railways F class (1902), 4-6-2T steam locomotives
