= Melbourne and Hobson's Bay Railway Company 2-4-0WT (1854) =

Class of Australian 2-4-0WT steam locomotives

Victorian 2-4-0WT
Type and origin
- Power type: Steam
- Builder: Robert Stephenson & Company, Newcastle upon Tyne, UK
- Serial number: 954-957, 1080, 1183, 1184, 1268, 1269, 1377, 1378, 1458-1460, 1620, 1802, 1803, 1991
- Build date: 1854-1871
- Total produced: 18 + spare parts loco
Specifications
- Configuration
  - Whyte: 2-4-0WT
- Gauge: 5 ft 3 in (1,600 mm) Victorian broad gauge
- Leading dia.: 3 ft 6 in (1.07 m)
- Driver dia.: 1st five: 4 ft 7.5 in (1,410 mm); Remainder of class: 5 ft 0 in (1,520 mm)
- Wheelbase: 13 ft 1 in (3.99 m)
  - Coupled: 7 ft 0 in (2,130 mm)
- Length
  - Over couplers: 27 ft 9 1/2 in (8.471 m)
- Height: 11 ft 6 in (3.51 m)
- Axle load: 11 long tons 0 cwt (24,600 lb or 11.2 t); 11 long tons 13 cwt 3 qr (26,180 lb or 11.88 t)
- Loco weight: 29 long tons 12 cwt (66,300 lb or 30.1 t); 1904 diagram - Motor: 32 long tons 0 cwt 3 qr (71,760 lb or 32.55 t)
- Fuel type: Coke
- Fuel capacity: 5 long cwt (600 lb or 300 kg)
- Water cap.: 510 imp gal (2,300 L; 610 US gal); 1904 diagram - Motor: 1,171 imp gal (5,320 L; 1,406 US gal)
- Firebox
  - Grate area: 12.25 sq ft (1.138 m^{2})
- Boiler pressure: 1904 diagram: 246, 252, 254: 90 psi (621 kPa); 256, 258: 130 psi (896 kPa)
- Heating surface
  - Firebox: 67.15 sq ft (6.238 m^{2})
  - Tubes: 664.45 sq ft (61.729 m^{2})
  - Total surface: 731.60 sq ft (68 m^{2})
- Cylinders: 2, outside
- Cylinder size: 1st five: 12 in × 20 in (305 mm × 508 mm); Remainder of class: 14 in × 22 in (356 mm × 559 mm)
Performance figures
- Tractive effort: 1904 diagram - 130psi: 7,474 lbf (33.25 kN)
Career
- First run: 25 December 1854
- Last run: 26 May 1906 (51.4 years)

This was a group of 18 2-4-0WT passenger steam locomotives, built by Robert Stephenson & Company and an extra locomotive built from spare parts supplied with the other 18. These locomotives not only provided the bulk workforce of the early private railway operators in Victoria, Australia, but upon their withdrawal they once again proved themselves useful as contractors' locos building some of the railway lines for the then expanding Victorian railway network.

== History ==
=== Owners ===
Over the years, new Stephenson 2-4-0WT locomotives were ordered and operated by the various private operators of the early Victorian railway network and later the Victorian Railways.

==== Melbourne and Hobson's Bay Railway Company (M&HBR) 1854–1865 ====
M&HBR's 2-4-0WT (1854)
Specifications
Career
- Operators: Melbourne and Hobson's Bay Railway Company: 1854–1865; Melbourne and Suburban Railway Company: 1858–1862; St Kilda and Brighton Railway Company: 1861–1862; Melbourne Railway Company: 1862–1865; Melbourne and Hobson's Bay United Railway Company: 1865–1878; South Suburban: 1878–1886; Victorian Railways: 1886–1906
- Number in class: 10
- Numbers: M&HBR / M&SR / SK&BR / MRC: Melbourne, Sandridge, Victoria, Yarra, St Kilda, Rapid, Meteor, 1268, 1269, 1458; M&HBUR / South Suburban: 1–4, 6–9, 11, Melbourne, Sandridge, Victoria, Yarra, St Kilda, Rapid, Meteor; VR: N242, N244, N246, N248, N252
- Delivered: 1854
- First run: 25 December 1854
- Last run: 26 May 1906 (51.4 years)
- Disposition: 5 sold, 5 became Victorian Railways N class All later scrapped

The first two locomotive for the Melbourne and Hobson's Bay Railway Company (B/n 954–955) arrived in Hobson's Bay aboard the vessel 'Jane Francis' on 23 November 1854 and were unloaded three weeks later. The first commenced running on 25 December and the second on 5 January 1855, thereafter each working the traffic on alternate days. The ship 'Hannah Conner' reached Melbourne on 23 January 1955 with the next two engines (B/n 956–957) and by April 1855 all four were in service, being used in rotation. A fifth locomotive (B/n 1080), ordered in anticipation of the opening of the company's branch to St Kilda, arrived on the 'Magna Bona' on 12 June 1857. These five locomotives were named Melbourne (954), Sandridge (955), Victoria (956), Yarra (957), and St Kilda (1080).

Two locomotives (B/n 1183–1184) were built in 1858, with the same wheel arrangement but with larger dimensions than the first five including 14 in × 22 in (356 mm × 559 mm) cylinders and 5 ft (1,500 mm) diameter wheels. These were named Rapid (1183), and Meteor (1184). In 1860, another two of this larger type were added (B/n 1268–1269). This was followed by a third (B/n 1458), which arrived on the ship 'Express' on 28 June 1863. Unlike the previous locomotives, these remained unnamed.

Victoria was sold to Melbourne and Suburban Railway Company in 1858 and Melbourne and Yarra were sold to St Kilda and Brighton Railway Company in 1862. Sandridge was taken out of running service in 1863. When the M&HBR was amalgamated with the Melbourne Railway Company on 30 June 1865, the six remaining operating locomotives and Sandridge passed to the newly named Melbourne and Hobson's Bay United Railway Company.

==== Melbourne and Suburban Railway Company (M&SR) 1858–1862 ====
M&SR's 2-4-0WT (1861)
Specifications
Career
- Operators: Melbourne and Suburban Railway Company: 1861–1862; Melbourne Railway Company: 1862–1865; Melbourne and Hobson's Bay United Railway Company: 1865–1878; South Suburban: 1878–1882
- Number in class: 2 + spare parts
- Numbers: M&SR / MRC: Kew, 1378; M&HBUR / South Suburban: 10, Kew; VR: N250
- Delivered: 1861
- First run: October 1861
- Last run: 1882 (20.9 years)
- Disposition: Spare parts built into a new loco All sold All later scrapped

The Melbourne and Suburban Railway Company purchased Victoria from the Melbourne and Hobson's Bay Railway Company in December 1858 (for £2408.13.11) to run from Princes Bridge to Hawthorn, but did not enter service until after the line opened 5 February 1859.

With the extension of the M&SR's line to Hawthorn in 1861, a further 2 locomotives were ordered, they arrived on the ship 'Water Nymph' on 20 May 1861. The first entered service in October 1861 named Kew (B/n 1377). The other one, builders number 1378, could not be paid for and was sold (along with the spare parts) to Cornish & Bruce, contractors for the Bendigo line.

The company was facing financial trouble and was sold at auction on 31 March 1862 to the Melbourne Railway Company.

==== St Kilda and Brighton Railway Company (SK&BR) 1861–1865 ====
On 1 February 1861, the St Kilda and Brighton Railway Company hired two engines, Melbourne and Yarra, from the Melbourne and Hobson's Bay Railway Company, before purchasing them on the 1 February 1862. Working of the SK&BR was later taken over by the Melbourne Railway Company with the stock of the two companies pooled and these two engines passed into the latters control on 1 May 1862 but not into their ownership. The SK&BR was eventually purchased by the Melbourne and Hobson's Bay United Railway Company on 1 September 1865, and these two locomotives rejoined the rest of the class.

==== Melbourne Railway Company (MRC) 1862–1865 ====
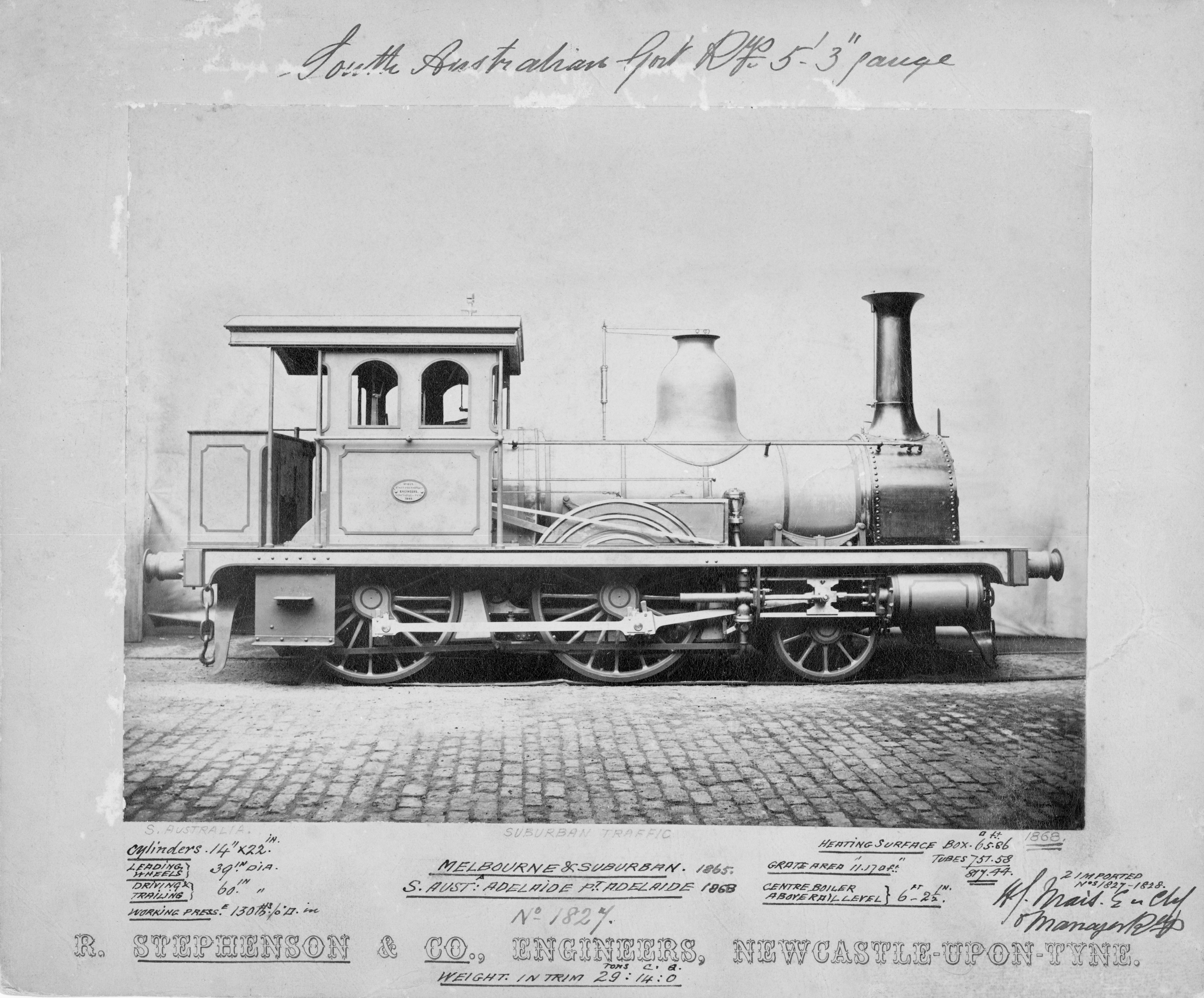
Builder's photo of the type of Robert Stephenson and Company 2-4-0 well tank locomotive ordered by the Melbourne and Suburban Railway Company in 1865. It was delivered after the company had been acquired by the Melbourne and Hobson's Bay Railway Company. Nearly identical locomotives were also sold to the South Australian Railways.

MRC's 2-4-0WT (1863)
Specifications
Career
- Operators: Melbourne Railway Company: 1863–1865; Melbourne and Hobson's Bay United Railway Company: 1865–1878; South Suburban: 1878–1886; Victorian Railways: 1886–1906
- Number in class: 2
- Numbers: MRC: Windsor, Prahran; M&HBUR / South Suburban: 12, 13, Windsor, Prahran; VR: N254
- Delivered: 1863
- First run: October 1863
- Last run: 7 June 1906 (42.7 years)
- Disposition: 1 sold, 1 became Victorian Railways N class All later scrapped

In March 1862 the Melbourne Railway Company purchased Victoria and Kew as part of the sale of the Melbourne and Suburban Railway Company. Then on 1 May 1862, working of the St Kilda and Brighton Railway was taken over by the MRC with the stock of the two companies pooled and the former companies two engines, Melbourne and Yarra, passed into the MRC's control, but not into their ownership.

Two more locomotives were built in 1863, B/n 1459 arrived on the ship 'Express' on 28 June 1863 and B/n 1460 on the 'Ontario' on 6 August 1863. They entered service in October 1861 named Windsor (B/n 1459) and Prahran (B/n 1460).

When the MRC was amalgamated with the Melbourne and Hobson's Bay Railway Company on 30 June 1865, the four locomotives of the MRC passed to the newly named Melbourne and Hobson's Bay United Railway Company.

==== Melbourne and Hobson's Bay United Railway Company (M&HBUR) 1865–1878 ====
M&HBUR's 2-4-0WT (1866)
Specifications
Career
- Operators: Melbourne and Hobson's Bay United Railway Company: 1866–1878; South Suburban: 1878–1886; Victorian Railways: 1886–1905
- Number in class: 4
- Numbers: M&HBUR / South Suburban: 14–16, 19, Toorak, Victoria; VR: N256, N258, N260
- Delivered: 1866–1971
- First run: 1866
- Last run: 30 September 1905 (39.1 years)
- Disposition: 1 sold, 3 became Victorian Railways N class All later scrapped

When the Melbourne and Hobson's Bay Railway was amalgamated with the Melbourne Railway Company on 30 June 1865, the newly named Melbourne and Hobson's Bay United Railway Company acquired eleven locomotives; Sandridge, St Kilda, Rapid, Meteor, Victoria, Kew, Windsor, Prahran, and the three unnamed locos (B/n 1268–1269, 1458). These were joined on 1 September 1865 by the two locomotives still owned by the St Kilda and Brighton Railway, Melbourne and Yarra.

A new locomotive, which appears to have been ordered by one of the previous companies prior to the amalgamation, was put into service 1866, with the name Toorak (B/n 1620). Two more locomotives (B/n 1802–1803) arrived on the ship 'Terzali' on 30 January 1867, and were put into service September of that year, with one of them being named; Victoria (B/n 1802) — this was the second locomotive to make use of that name, the other Victoria (B/n 956) being out of service at the time.

About 1870, the M&HBUR numbered all their locomotives, except Sandridge which remained out of running service, and retained their original names. They were numbered in the same numerical order as the builder numbers up to No. 16 — with No. 5 used for the Pier donkey (B/n 1177).

A final locomotive, B/n 1991, arrived on the ship 'Cardigan Castle' on 18 December 1870, and entered service in February 1871, taking the next available number, No. 19. This was the last Stephenson 2-4-0WT ordered by the private companies, bringing their total to eighteen.

Five were disposed of before the M&HBUR was taken over by the Government for their South Suburban system in 1878 (see below), while the nine remaining locomotives were transferred on 1 July 1878 to the Government for use on their South Suburban system; No. 1(Melbourne), No. 6 (Rapid), No. 7 (Meteor), No. 8, No. 9, No. 11, No. 13 (Prahran), No. 15 (Victoria), No. 16, No. 19.

==== South Suburban System (Victorian Railways) 1878–1886 ====
No. 14 (Toorak) was bought back in late 1877 by the Government for service on this isolated section until 1879 when it was connected to the rest of the system. The subsequent history of No. 14 with the VR is obscure, and it may have been sold without being placed back on the register.

On the 1 July 1878, the nine remaining 2-4-0WT locomotives (No.1, No. 6–No. 13, No. 15–No. 16, No. 19) of the Melbourne and Hobson's Bay United Railway were transferred to the Government's Victorian Railways. This was separate to the main Government system, and they were able to retain their previous numbers as they were not incorporated into the main Victorian Railways register until the introduction of letter classification in 1886. It was referred to as the Hobson's Bay system from 1879 to 1881, then as the South Suburban system from 1881 to 1886.

No. 1 (Melbourne) lay unused at the Williamstown Workshops, (it had been used around the 1870's as a portable steam plant for operating a steam powered wool press) and offered for sale to John Robb in 1880, but the offer not taken.

Between 1882 and 1886, the Government sold eight to various contractors before being added to the main Victorian Railways register (see below).

==== Victorian Railways (VR) 1886–1906 ====
The South Suburban system was finally incorporated into the Victorian Railways register on 1 January 1886 along with the introduction of the letter classification system. As there were already locomotives with the same numbers, these older locomotives (No. 6–No. 9, No. 11, No. 13, No. 15–No. 16, No. 19) were given the numbers 242–248, 252–260 (even only) and became known as the N class. South Suburban No. 10 was to be allocated N250 and No. 14 was to be allocated N272, but No. 10 was sold c. 1882 and No. 14 sold prior to 1886 and they may not have been renumbered.

Unlike No. 252–No. 258 which were modified for motor service, No. 246 remained unmodified for the rest of its life being used as a spare engine before finally being withdrawn with the four motors in the early 1900s.

==== Motor service ====
Between 1893 and 1895, N252–N258 were modified for motor running. This involved the addition of a door at the rear of the cab and handrails towards the front to allow guards to return to the engine while the train was moving, extra side tanks to increase the water capacity, as well as cowcatchers.

They were noted as follows:

- N252 in 1890 working trains on the Maldon line, in 1896 on the Outer Circle line, and in early 1900s on the Essendon to Broadmeadows line
- N254 in 1890 working trains on the Buninyong line and later the Essendon to Broadmeadows line
- N256 in 1890 stationed at Princes Bridge presumably for trains on the Outer Circle or Darling lines
- N258 in 1890 working trains on the Outer Circle line between Waverley Road and Camberwell and again in early 1895, while also noted at some point as running on the Lubeck to Rupanyup line

=== Design improvements ===
Over the years they were fitted with various alterations to the cabs. There were also various upgrades over the years; with constant improvements to safety — these including things like updates to safety valves (and domes), smokeboxs and chimneys (with spark arrestors), and brakes.

=== Accidents ===
- 10 February 1861 - Yarra derailed at Union Street, Windsor
- 8 May 1862 - Melbourne collided with Hercules at Botanic Gardens
- 22 May 1862 - Melbourne collided with Hawthorn at Elsternwick
- 25 April 1870 - 1803 collided with Hawthorn at North Port
- 3 May 1870 - Rapid broke crank axle at South Melbourne
- 12 September 1871 - No. 10 (Kew) collided with passenger train at Jolimont
- 2 August 1895 - N252 in derailed at Maldon Junction

=== Demise ===
Of the eighteen locomotives, at least twelve found their way to contractors for railway construction in Victoria.

- B/n 1378 could not be paid for and was sold to Cornish & Bruce in 1861 without even entering service. Used on their construction between Melbourne and Bendigo (named Bendigo). It was sold to Overend & Robb in 1871 for construction between Launceston and Deloraine, Tasmania (named Launceston). Overend & Robb returned it to Victoria in 1877 for construction between Ararat to Hamilton (named Pioneer). Sent to Echuca and conveyed by boat to Morgan, SA.
- Cornish & Bruce were urgent need of more locomotive power, so in 1862 they approached local Enoch Chambers to construct a locomotive from the spare parts supplied with B/n 1378. This loco was an identical copy of B/n 1378 and was named First Victorian (although it was neither the first built or first to run in Victoria) The First Victorian was used on construction between Melbourne and Bendigo. Then it was sold to Collier, Barry & Co. in 1864 for construction between Bendigo and Echuca (named Echuca). It was sold to Overend & Robb in 1871 for construction between Launceston and Deloraine, Tasmania (named Deloraine). Overend & Robb returned it to Victoria in 1877 for construction between Ararat to Hamilton (named Victorian).

Five were disposed of before the M&HBUR was taken over by the Government in 1878:

- Sandridge was sold in 1878 as portable steam plants for operating a steam powered wool press.
- No. 2 (Victoria) sold to Cain, Dalrymple and Holtom for £923 in June 1872 for construction between Benalla and Wodonga. Used by Public Works Department (Victoria) for river widening at Fishermans Bend and then later sold to George Pallett for construction between Beechworth and Yackandandah. Laying derelict near Yackandandah 1895
- No. 3 (Yarra) sold to Neil McNeil for £500 in December 1873 for construction between Ballarat and Beaufort (renamed Kangaroo).
- No. 4 (St Kilda) sold to Young and McGuigan for £950 in March 1874 for construction between Ballarat and Creswick. Then to John Thomas for construction between Creswick and Clunes.
- No. 14 (Toorak) sold to Millar and James in 1876 for construction of the line between Sale and Morwell (renamed Sale). It was bought back in 1877 by the Government for service on this isolated section until 1879 when it was connected to the rest of the system. The subsequent history of No. 14 with the VR is obscure, and it may have been sold without being placed back on the register.

Four were disposed of by the South Suburban system and another four around the time they were incorporated with the Victorian Railway register in 1886:

- No. 1 (Melbourne) was offered for sale to John Robb in 1880, but offer not taken. Exact disposal unknown.
- N242 (No. 6/Rapid) sold to Langlands and Co. for £650 in July 1886. Later to Jonathan Falkingham and Co. for construction between Dandenong to Korumburra.
- N244 (No. 7/Meteor) sold to Jonathan Falkingham and Co. for £800 in May 1886 for construction of the Melbourne Goods Yards, North Melbourne Loco Depot and Dandenong to Korumburra.
- N248 (No. 9) sold to Nicholl, Gray and Tamlyn for £850 in 1886 for construction between Tatura and Echuca.
- N250 (No. 10/Kew) sold to M Gardiner and Sons in c. 1882 for construction work.
- No. 12 (Windsor) was first sold to Public Works Department (Victoria) in January 1882, then sold to M Gardiner and Sons in 1884 for Coode Canal work.
- No. 14 (Toorak) sold (for a second time) to unknown contractor sometime prior to 1886.
- N260 (No. 19) sold to Nicholl, Gray and Tamlyn for £800 in 1886 for construction between Tatura and Echuca. Later sold to Andrew O'Keefe for construction between Heathcote and Bendigo (named Sue around this time) then for construction between Korumburra and Toora.

There are also two mystery loco disposal. These are known to come from this group of locos, but their exact ID's have not been identified:

- Unknown loco sold to Walls, McAllister & Stansmore in February 1887 for construction between Camperdown and Terang (named Terang), in 1888 for construction between Inglewood and Dunolly (under the company's name Wiggins, McAllister & Stansmore), in 1889 for construction between Irrewarra to Beeac (under the company's name McAllister, Stansmore & Co), finally for their construction between Birregurra and Forest. This construction contract was subsequently transferred to Lewis & Roberts to finish the line. It was left abandoned in a siding at Murroon, where it waited until 1902 when it was acquired by the Great Western Colliery Company, Deans Marsh for their tramway until suffering a boiler explosion on 11 September 1903.
- Unknown loco sold to Lewis & Roberts c. 1888 for construction between Ballarat and Buninyong (named Ballarat) then for their construction between Birregurra and Forest. It then went to Bloomfield Bros c. 1888 for construction between both Terang and Mortlake and Terang and Warrnambool. Noted as being condemned due to being in very poor condition.

The remaining five; N246 (No. 8), N252 (No. 11), N254 (No. 13/Prahran), N256 (No. 15/Victoria), and N258 (No. 16); were finally withdrawn between 1904 and 1906 after around 45 years of service:

== Fleet summary ==
Key:	In service	Preserved	Stored or withdrawn	Scrapped	‡ = Operator not owner

No.	Name	Builder no.	Entered service	Withdrawn	Scrapped	Status	Owners	Notes
1	Melbourne	954	25 December 1854			Scrapped	Melbourne & Hobson's Bay Railway (1854), St Kilda & Brighton Railway (1861)‡, St Kilda & Brighton Railway (1862), Melbourne Railway Company (1862)‡, Melbourne & Hobson's Bay United Railway (1865), South Suburban (1878)	Used for wool pressing prior to 1870
-	Sandridge	955	5 January 1855	1863		Scrapped	Melbourne & Hobson's Bay Railway (1855), Melbourne & Hobson's Bay United Railway (1865)	Sold for wool pressing - 1878
2	Victoria	956	March 1855			Scrapped	Melbourne & Hobson's Bay Railway (1855), Melbourne & Suburban Railway (1858), Melbourne Railway Company (1862), Melbourne & Hobson's Bay United Railway (1865)	Stored - c1867. Sold to Cain, Dalrymple & Holtom - June 1872. Used by Public Works Department (Victoria) for river widening. Sold to George Pallett. Laying derelict near Yackandandah - 1895
3	Yarra	957	April 1855			Scrapped	Melbourne & Hobson's Bay Railway (1855), St Kilda & Brighton Railway (1861)‡, St Kilda & Brighton Railway (1862), Melbourne Railway Company (1862)‡, Melbourne & Hobson's Bay United Railway (1865)	Sold to Neil McNeil and renamed Kangaroo - December 1873
4	St Kilda	1080	July 1857			Scrapped	Melbourne & Hobson's Bay Railway (1857), Melbourne & Hobson's Bay United Railway (1865)	Sold to Young & McGuigan - March 1874. To John Thomas - c1874
6 N242	Rapid	1183	November 1858	July 1886		Scrapped	Melbourne & Hobson's Bay Railway (1858), Melbourne & Hobson's Bay United Railway (1865), South Suburban (1878), Victorian Railways (1886)	Became N242 on the VR. Sold to Langlands and Co. - July 1886. Later to Jonathan Falkingham
7 N244	Meteor	1184	November 1858	1886		Scrapped	Melbourne & Hobson's Bay Railway (1858), Melbourne & Hobson's Bay United Railway (1865), South Suburban (1878), Victorian Railways (1886)	Became N244 on the VR. Sold to Jonathan Falkingham - May 1886
8 N246	-	1268	March 1860	April 1904	23 April 1904	Scrapped	Melbourne & Hobson's Bay Railway (1860), Melbourne & Hobson's Bay United Railway (1865), South Suburban (1878), Victorian Railways (1886)	Became N246 on the VR
9 N248	-	1269	March 1860	1886		Scrapped	Melbourne & Hobson's Bay Railway (1860), Melbourne & Hobson's Bay United Railway (1865), South Suburban (1878), Victorian Railways (1886)	Became N248 on the VR. Sold to Nicholl, Gray and Tamlyn - 1886
10	Kew	1377	October 1861			Scrapped	Melbourne & Suburban Railway (1861), Melbourne Railway Company (1862), Melbourne & Hobson's Bay United Railway (1865), South Suburban (1878)	Sold to M. Gardiner and Sons - 1882
-	-	1378	-			Scrapped	-	Could not be paid for and sold to Cornish & Bruce and named Bendigo - 1861. Sold to Overend & Robb (for work in Tasmania) and renamed Launceston - 1871. Back to Victoria and renamed Pioneer - 1877. Sent to Echuca and conveyed by boat to Morgan, SA
11; N252	-	1458	August 1863	26 May 1906	26 May 1906	Scrapped	Melbourne & Hobson's Bay Railway (1863), Melbourne & Hobson's Bay United Railway (1865), South Suburban (1878), Victorian Railways (1886)	Became N252 on the VR
12	Windsor	1459	October 1863			Scrapped	Melbourne Railway Company (1863), Melbourne & Hobson's Bay United Railway (1865), South Suburban (1878)	Sold to Public Works Department - January 1882. Sold to M. Gardiner and Sons - 1884
13; N254	Prahran	1460	October 1863	7 June 1906	9 June 1906	Scrapped	Melbourne Railway Company (1863), Melbourne & Hobson's Bay United Railway (1865), South Suburban (1878), Victorian Railways (1886)	Became N254 on the VR
14	Toorak	1620	1866			Scrapped	Melbourne & Hobson's Bay United Railway (1866), South Suburban (1877)	Sold to Miller & James - 1876. Bought back by the Government - February 1877. Sold sometime prior to 1886
15; N256	Victoria	1802	1867	8 August 1904	8 August 1904	Scrapped	Melbourne & Hobson's Bay United Railway (1867), South Suburban (1878), Victorian Railways (1886)	Became N256 on the VR
16; N258	-	1803	1867	30 September 1905	30 September 1905	Scrapped	Melbourne & Hobson's Bay United Railway (1867), South Suburban (1878), Victorian Railways (1886)	Became N258 on the VR
19; N260	-	1991	February 1871	1886		Scrapped	Melbourne & Hobson's Bay United Railway (1871), South Suburban (1878), Victorian Railways (1886)	Became N260 on the VR. Sold to Nicholl, Grey and Tamlyn - 1886. Sold to Andrew O'Keefe - 1887 (named Sue at some point)
-	-	N/A	-			Scrapped	-	Built from the spare parts by Enoch Chambers for Cornish & Bruce and named First Victorian - 1862. Sold to Collier, Barry & Co. and named Echuca - 1864. Sold to Overend & Robb (for work in Tasmania) and renamed Deloraine - 1871. Back to Victoria and renamed Victorian - 1877
