= St Kilda – Windsor railway line =

Railway line in Australia

St Kilda–Windsor

Overview
- Status: Dismantled line
- Owner: St Kilda & Brighton Railway Company (1859–1865); Melbourne & Hobson's Bay Railway Company (1865–1876)
- Locale: Melbourne, Victoria, Australia
- Termini: St Kilda; Windsor
- Connecting lines: Sandringham & St Kilda lines
- Stations: 1 current station; 1 former station

Service
- Type: Former Melbourne suburban service
- Operators: St Kilda & Brighton Railway Company (1859–1862); Melbourne Railway Company (1862–1865); Melbourne & Hobson's Bay United Railway (1865–1876)

History
- Opened: 19 December 1859
- First train: 3 December 1859
- Closed: 1 October 1862

Technical
- Line length: 2.1 km (1.3 mi)
- Number of tracks: Single track
- Track gauge: 1,600 mm (5 ft 3 in)

The St Kilda-Windsor railway line was a short-lived section of railway that linked the isolated Windsor to Brighton (Bay Street) section of the Melbourne railway network to the city. The branch line fell into disuse when an alternative route was built between Windsor and Richmond stations.

== Purpose ==
Windsor station, originally called "Chapel Street Station", was the terminus for northbound trains on the Brighton Beach line. It was run by the St Kilda and Brighton Railway Company, which built the loop line connecting the isolated Brighton line to the St Kilda line, so that the former could be connected to the city. Trains from the city travelled south to St Kilda terminus, and then "backed out" on to the loop line to Windsor. The loop was carried on wooden trestles across a swamp now known as the Albert Park Lake, and had a raised embankment with a bridge over St Kilda Road.

A possible reason for the construction of the loop line connecting through to St Kilda was the difficulty experienced by contractors in constructing a rail crossing over the Yarra River at Cremorne, known in the mid-19th century as "Forrest Hill". In the mid-19th century the railway bisected a swamp. Cooper (1924; p. 181) reports that when the rail embankment was first being constructed it subsided, burying ballast trucks in the swamp. The cost of recovering the trucks was deemed to be uneconomic, so a second embankment was constructed over them.

== Operation ==
The first train on the loop line from St Kilda was on 3 December 1859, and it opened to the public ten days later. There were no trains after 7 pm on the branch line; patrons simply walked to their homes in Prahran from St Kilda station in Fitzroy Street.

A short time after the loop line was constructed, a competing connection was built between Windsor and Richmond stations, with the first train arriving at Windsor directly from Melbourne on 24 November 1860. The loop line to St Kilda then fell into disuse, and track duplication, a condition of the original Crown lease, was never completed.

== Station histories ==
Station	Opened	Closed	Age	Notes
St Kilda	13 May 1857	1 August 1987	130 years	
Windsor	19 December 1859		166 years	Formerly Chapel Street

== Demise ==
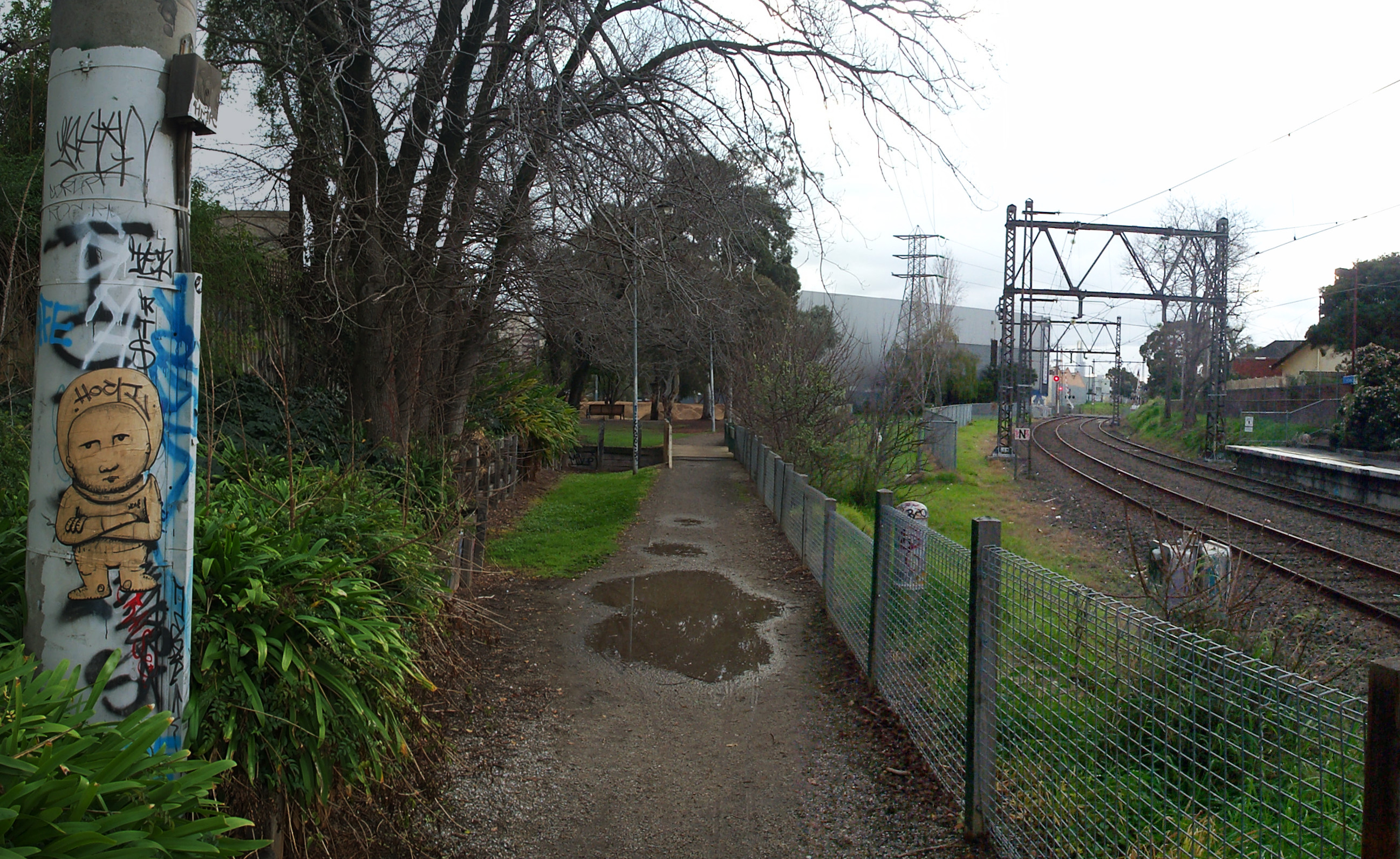
The alignment of the line at Windsor station today, current main line to city at right

The St Kilda and Brighton Railway Company experienced financial difficulties, no doubt exacerbated by the direct link to Melbourne through Prahran and Windsor, and was bought by the Melbourne and Suburban Railway Company in 1862. The track, bridge and trestles between St Kilda Station and Punt Road were dismantled, probably less than five years after original construction. However, a siding from Windsor station to Hoddle Street remained. Due to the track alignments there were now two level crossings within 100 metres (330 ft) on Union Street, because the siding continued to be used for shunting trains from the Brighton line, and to carry screenings from the Richmond quarries to a commercial depot on Punt Road (then known as Hoddle Street).

Perversely, it was due to local annoyance at the level crossing on the siding near the station that trains won the legal right-of-way at road-rail intersections in Victoria. Indignant at the delays to horse-drawn traffic caused by trains, and in particular the perpetually closed and unstaffed crossing of the siding, Prahran local councillors, along with a gang of men, a solicitor and some police, marched to the level crossing in question one morning in 1869 and began to rip up the tracks on the siding. The matter was brought to court on 17 April 1869 and, although the railways won the right-of-way case, the siding was not reconstructed.

No evidence remains of the embankments or the bridge over St Kilda Road, although the alignment of the loop can be traced by residual parkland and some oddly-shaped property boundaries. A small park to the west of Windsor station is called "Windsor Siding".
