= South Australian Railways A class =

Class of South Australian steam locomotives

South Australian Railways A class locomotive
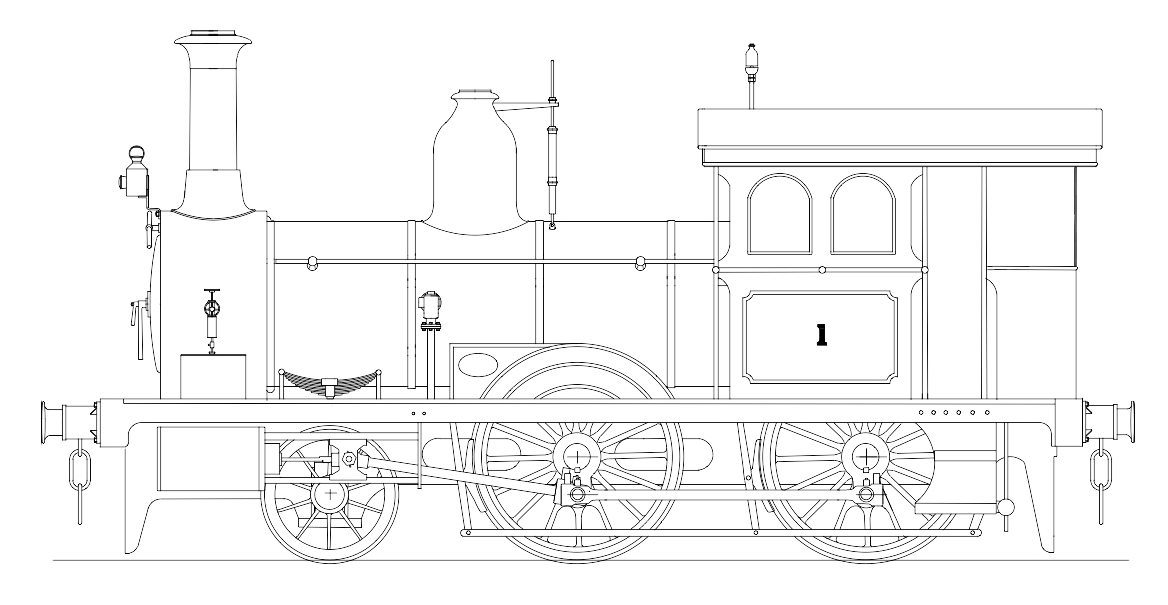
Type and origin
- Power type: Steam
- Builder: Robert Stephenson and Company
- Order number: 1827, 1828, 2108
- Build date: 1868
- Total produced: 3
- Rebuilder: Islington Workshops
- Rebuild date: 1889 (no. 1); 1883 & 1911 (no. 19)
- Number rebuilt: 2
Specifications
- Configuration
  - Whyte: 2-4-0WT
  - UIC: 1'B T
- Gauge: 1600 mm (5 ft 3 in)
- Leading dia.: 39 inches (990 millimetres)
- Driver dia.: 60 in (1524 mm)
- Minimum curve: 18 chains (360 metres)
- Wheelbase: 7 ft 0 in (2130 mm)
- Length
  - Over beams: 26 ft 6 in (8077 mm)
- Width: 7 ft 6 in (2290 mm) over running board (Note: Not known. Inferred, based on SAR C class.)
- Height: 12 ft 10 in (3912 mm)
- Frame type: Plate
- Axle load
  - Leading: 8 long tons 14 cwt (9.7 short tons; 8.8 t)
  - Coupled: 10 long tons 15 cwt (12.0 short tons; 10.9 t)
- Loco weight: 30 long tons 4 cwt (33.8 short tons; 30.7 t) loaded
- Fuel type: Coal
- Fuel capacity: 13 3/4 long hundredweight (0.77 short tons; 0.70 t)
- Water cap.: 225 imp gal (1020 L; 270 US gal)
- Firebox
  - Type: Round-top
  - Grate area: 11.17 sq ft (1.038 m^{2})
- Boiler
  - Pitch: 6 ft 2 1/2 in (1892 mm)
- Boiler pressure: 130 lbf/in^{2} (896 kPa)
- Safety valve: Salter spring balance
- Heating surface
  - Firebox: 65.9 sq ft (6.12 m^{2})
  - Tubes: 751.6 sq ft (69.83 m^{2})
  - Total surface: 817.4 sq ft (75.94 m^{2})
- Cylinders: Two
- Cylinder size: 14 in × 22 in (356 mm × 559 mm)
- Valve gear: Stephenson's
- Couplers: Hook and screw
Performance figures
- Tractive effort: 7940 lbf (35.32 kN)
Career
- Operators: South Australian Railways
- Class: A
- Number in class: 3
- Numbers: 1, 19, 20
- First run: September 1868
- Withdrawn: 1893 (no. 20), 1923 (no. 19), 1924 (no. 1)
- Disposition: All scrapped

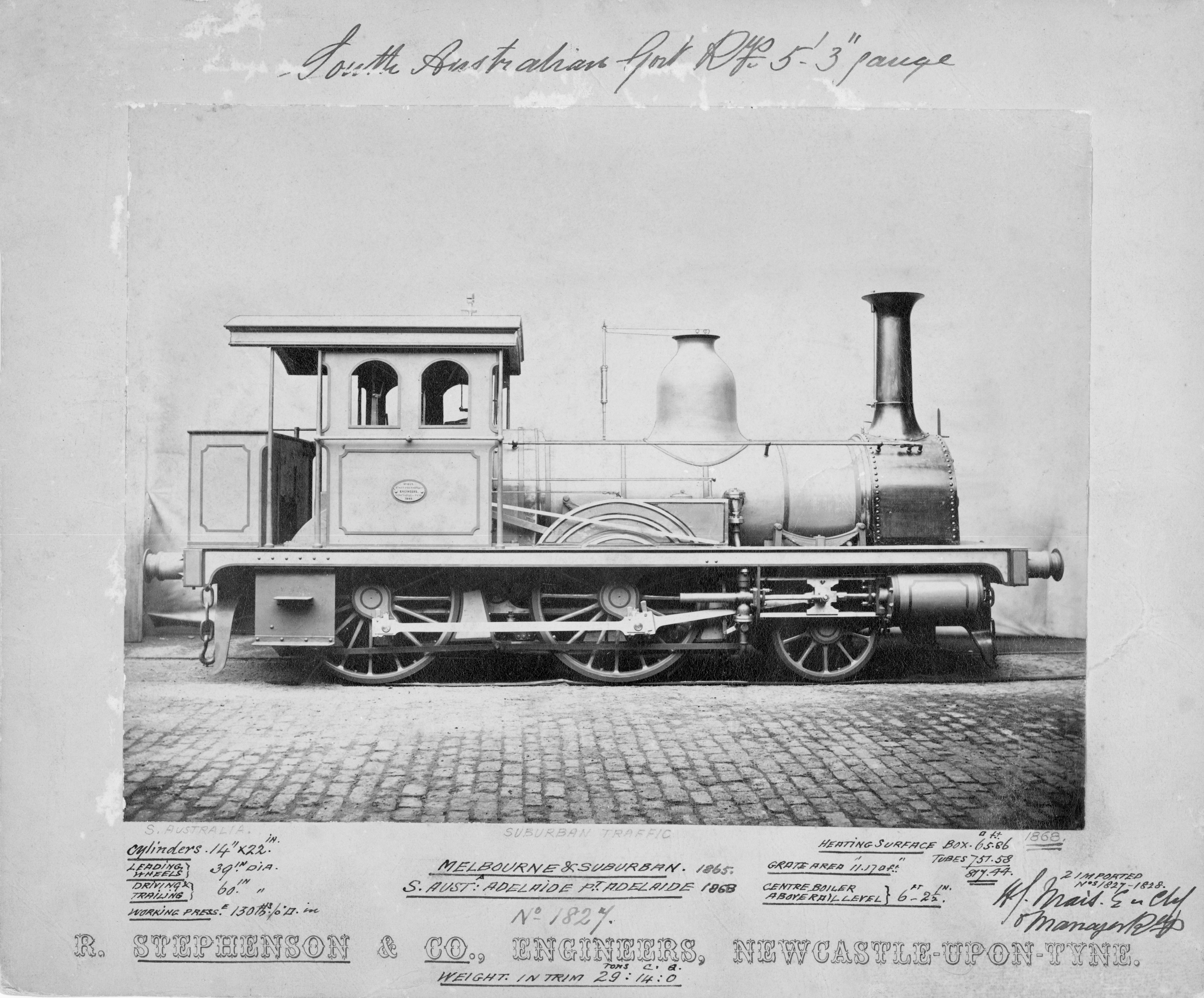
Robert Stephenson & Company builder's photo of a locomotive, as built, that together with two others became the A class. Locomotives of essentially the same design were also purchased by private railway companies in Melbourne.

The first two of what later became the South Australian Railways A class of locomotives, built by Robert Stephenson and Company, England, arrived at Port Adelaide for the South Australian Railways in September and October 1868. A third, final locomotive arrived in 1873.

== Design ==
The A class design was very similar to the well tank locomotives (2-4-0WT) that Stephenson supplied to the Melbourne and Hobson's Bay Railway Company between 1854 and 1871. The main difference between the locos supplied to Victoria and those supplied to South Australia was the size of the cab, with the Victorian locos having a very much smaller cab, with no side plates. Even then, the two windows on each side of the A class cab remained unglazed.

The three locomotives were the first broad gauge locomotives to be fitted with outside cylinders.

The drawings show locomotive no. 1 in its final form with fully enclosed cab, complete with glazed side windows, a boiler the same diameter as the firebox, a dome that is smaller in diameter but taller than the original, and a new funnel with a more conventional shape. Not evident is the alteration to the front spectacle plate by which two circular windows replaced the three windows originally supplied.

== Deployment ==
When the railway line from Roseworthy to Forrester's (now known as Tarlee) was opened on 5 July 1869, it was intended that a pair of 2-4-0WT locomotives, not yet classified as A class, would operate on it. The rails were lightweight – 40 pounds/yard (20 kilograms/metre) – and soon after the line's opening in September 1869 it became evident that the locomotives were too rigid in their wheelbase and too heavy for the track. New F class locomotives, which entered service later in the month, took over the task.

The pair were then placed in service on the Port Adelaide line, where they proved to be a much more valuable asset, so much so that a third locomotive was ordered from Robert Stephenson and Company, arriving in 1873, by which time they had become the A class. Subsequently the three engines were allocated to suburban passenger and goods services around the Adelaide metropolitan network. In 1923 the A class were listed as being able to work on the North Terrace to Glenelg line with either freight or passenger trains; Mile End to Port Adelaide with freight trains; Port Adelaide to Dry Creek; Dry Creek to Stockade (Northfield line); Adelaide to Brighton; and Strathalbyn to Milang. Other work included shunting from Port Dock station to numerous wharfs in the area, in Islington Workshops and the Adelaide yards, and at Milang.

== Refurbishing and withdrawal ==
Refurbishing of two of the locos, including replacing the boiler, took place after about 15 years' service: no.19 in 1883 and again in 1911, and no.1 in 1889. No.20 missed out on a rebuild and, as a consequence, was the first to be withdrawn, in 1893. No. 19 was condemned in 1923 and no. 1 in 1924.

== Gallery ==
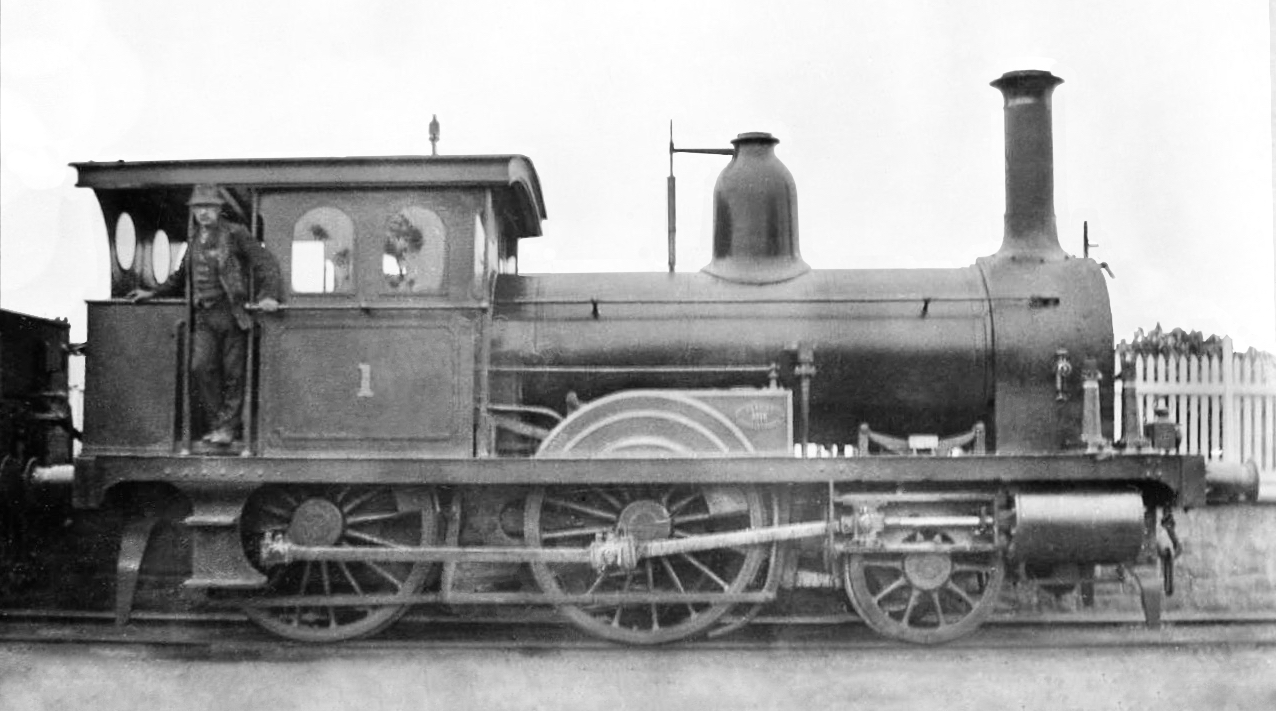

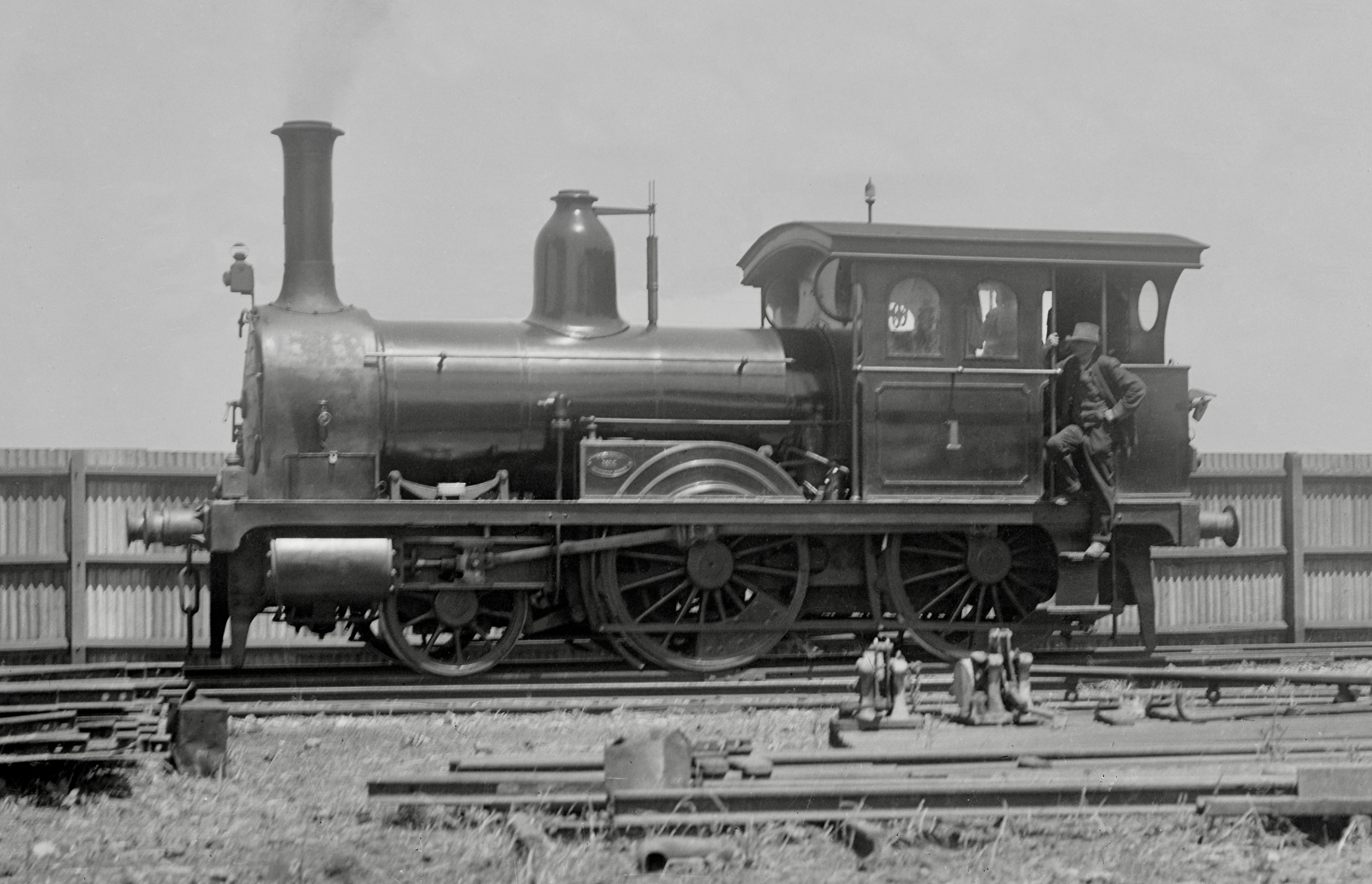

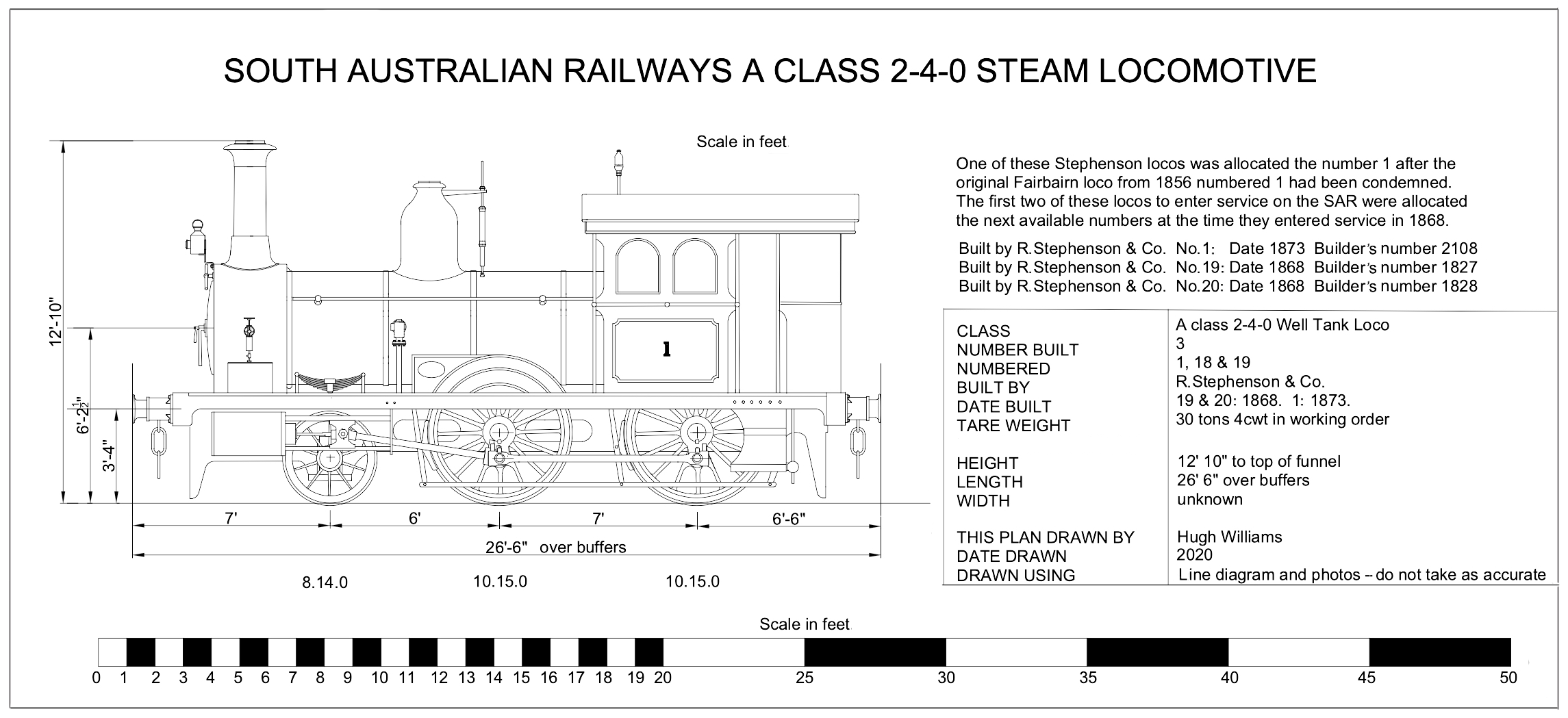

Loco no. 1, circa 1920s – right hand side

Loco no. 1, circa 1920s – left hand side

Dimensioned drawing (click to enlarge)
