= Botanic Gardens railway station, Melbourne =

Former railway station in Melbourne Australia

Botanic Gardens
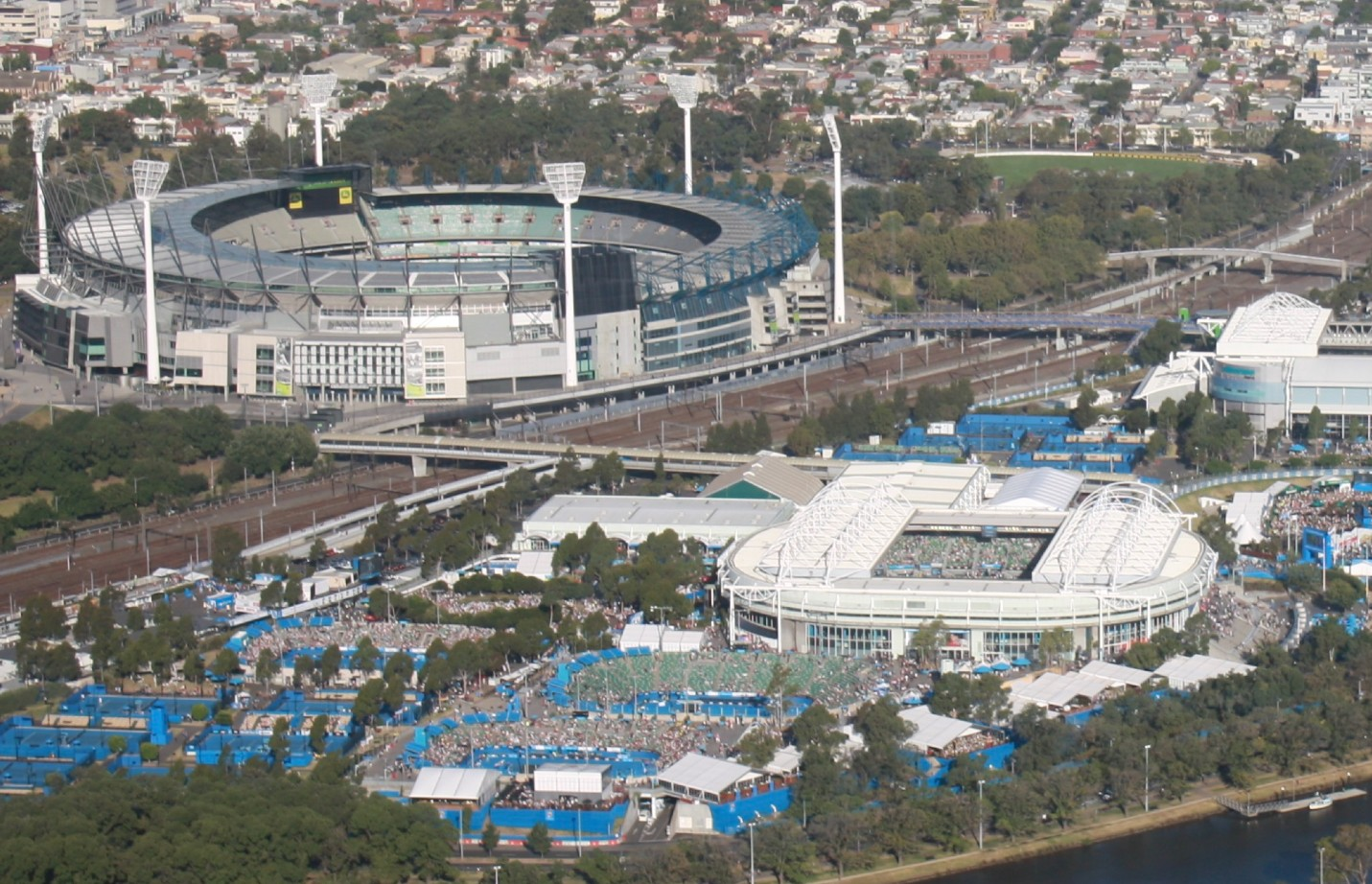
- View of the approximate station site in 2010

General information
- Coordinates: 37°49′18″S 144°58′59″E (approximate)
- Line: Melbourne and Suburban Railway Company

Other information
- Status: Demolished

History
- Opened: 3 February 1859; 167 years ago
- Closed: 1862; 164 years ago
Location

Botanic Gardens was an early inner suburban railway station in Melbourne, Australia. It was a small station built to serve both the Melbourne Cricket Ground and Royal Botanic Gardens. The station was located near the narrow humpback footbridge from Yarra Park to Swan Street between Princes Bridge and Richmond stations.

== History ==
It was opened on 3 February 1859 by the Melbourne & Suburban Railway Company, three weeks after the opening of its line to Richmond, which was later extended as the Hawthorn and Windsor lines. It had limited facilities and lacked shelter on platforms.

As it was one of the first stations in Melbourne to close, details of it are sparse. It opened only for traffic on Wednesdays afternoons, Saturdays and Sundays. It closed around 1862, although an exact date is not known. Following its closure, the area was served by trams for many years, until Jolimont railway station was opened nearby.
