= Melbourne and Hobson's Bay United Railway Company 4-4-0WT (1871) =

Class of 26 Australian 4-4-0WT steam locomotives

Victorian 4-4-0WT
Type and origin
- Power type: Steam
- Builder: Robert Stephenson & Company, Newcastle upon Tyne, UK (6); Robinson Brothers, South Melbourne (8); Phoenix Foundry, Ballarat (12)
- Serial number: Robert Stephenson: 1995, 2123, 2130, 2214, 2328, 2329; Robinson Brothers: 1–8; Phoenix Foundry: 98–109
- Build date: 1871–1883
- Total produced: 26
Specifications
- Configuration
  - Whyte: 4-4-0WT
- Gauge: 5 ft 3 in (1,600 mm) Victorian broad gauge
- Leading dia.: 3 ft 3 in (0.99 m)
- Driver dia.: 5 ft 0 in (1,520 mm)
- Wheelbase: 19 ft 0 in (5.79 m)
  - Leading: 6 ft 0 in (1.83 m)
  - Coupled: 7 ft 0 in (2,130 mm)
- Length
  - Over couplers: 30 ft 0 in (9.14 m)
- Height: 12 ft 8 1/8 in (3.864 m)
- Axle load: 13 long tons 15 cwt (30,800 lb or 14 t); 1914 diagram: 14 long tons 11 cwt 2 qr (32,650 lb or 14.81 t)
- Loco weight: 37 long tons 16 cwt 3 qr (84,760 lb or 38.44 t); 1914 diagram: 37 long tons 11 cwt (84,100 lb or 38.2 t)
- Fuel capacity: 7 long cwt (800 lb or 400 kg)
- Water cap.: 636 imp gal (2,890 L; 764 US gal)
- Firebox
  - Grate area: 10.5 sq ft (0.98 m^{2})
- Boiler pressure: 1904 diagram: 306: 120 psi (827 kPa); 262, 264, 266, 270, 274, 276, 278, 280, 282, 288, 290, 292, 298, 300, 302, 304, 308, 310: 125 psi (862 kPa); 268, 272, 284, 286, 296: 130 psi (896 kPa); 42, 294: 140 psi (965 kPa)
- Heating surface
  - Firebox: 74.87 sq ft (6.956 m^{2})
  - Tubes: 686.07 sq ft (63.738 m^{2})
  - Total surface: 760.94 sq ft (71 m^{2})
- Cylinders: 2, outside
- Cylinder size: 15 in × 22 in (381 mm × 559 mm)
Performance figures
- Tractive effort: 8,250 lbf (36.7 kN) at 100 psi 1904 diagram - 140psi: 9,240 lbf (41.1 kN); 1914 diagram: 6,600 lbf (29 kN)
Career
- Operators: Victorian Railways
- Number in class: 26
- Numbers: Numbers at delivery: 26-31, 52-63, 70-81, 88-89 (never ran with these), Numbers in service: 19-81, 127-149 (odd only)
- Delivered: 1871
- First run: August 1871
- Last run: 19 February 1916 (44.6 years)
- Withdrawn: 1883 - 1916
- Disposition: All scrapped

This was a group of 6 4-4-0WT passenger steam locomotives, built by Robert Stephenson & Company for an early private railway operator in Victoria, and expanded by another 20 locomotives locally built by Robinson Brothers and Phoenix Foundry for the Victorian Railways. They later were known as the Victorian Railways C class.

== History ==
=== Owners ===
The original six 4-4-0WT locomotives built by Stephenson were ordered and operated by the Melbourne and Hobson's Bay United Railway Company and later the Victorian Railways.

==== Melbourne and Hobson's Bay United Railway Company (M&HBUR) 1871–1878 ====
M&HBUR's 4-4-0WT (1871)
Specifications
Career
- Operators: Melbourne and Hobson's Bay United Railway Company: 1871–1878; South Suburban: 1878–1886; Victorian Railways: 1886–1913
- Number in class: 6
- Numbers: M&HBUR / South Suburban: 20–23, 25–26; VR: C278–C288 (even only)
- Delivered: 1871–1878
- First run: August 1871
- Last run: 17 December 1913 (42.4 years)
- Disposition: All became Victorian Railways C class All later scrapped

The first 4-4-0WT locomotive for the Melbourne and Hobson's Bay Railway Company (B/n 1995) arrived in Hobson's Bay aboard the vessel 'Khandeish' on 13 June 1871 at a cost of £2,444 to land (including customs duty) — it is possibly the first bogie engine in Victoria — and is numbered No.20. The ship 'Astracan' reached Melbourne on 6 April 1973 with the next engine No.21 (B/n 2123) entering service soon after, followed by the 'Loch Ness' on 17 January 1974 with the next two engines No.22 & No.23 (B/n 2130 & 2214), although these locomotives didn't enter service until September and October 1875. Around this time, one of these four locomotives was hired by the Victorian Railways for trial observations. The M&HBUR ordered a final two 4-4-0WT's in February 1877, they arrived aboard the 'Hawarden Castle' (B/n 2328) and the 'Melanope' (B/n 2329) both arriving 1 February 1878 and numbered No.25 & No.26.

When the M&HBUR was taken over by the Government in 1878, the six locomotives were transferred on 1 July 1878 to the Government for use on their South Suburban system (see below).

==== South Suburban System (Victorian Railways) 1878–1886 ====
VR's 4-4-0WT (1880)
Specifications
Career
- Operators: South Suburban: 1880–1886; Victorian Railways: 1886–1913
- Number in class: 20
- Numbers: South Suburban: 1–4, 12, 14, 17, 18, 27–38; VR: C42, C262–C276, C290–C310 (even only)
- Delivered: 1880–1883
- First run: August 1880
- Last run: 19 February 1916 (35.5 years)
- Disposition: All became Victorian Railways C class All later scrapped

On the 1 July 1878, the six 4-4-0WT locomotives (No. 20–No. 23, No. 25–No. 26) of the Melbourne and Hobson's Bay United Railway were transferred to the Government's Victorian Railways. This was separate to the main Government system, and they were able to retain their previous numbers as they were not incorporated into the main Victorian Railways register until the introduction of letter classification in 1886. It was referred to as the Hobson's Bay system from 1879 to 1881, then as the South Suburban system from 1881 to 1886.

In 1880–81, eight were locally built by Robinson Brothers of South Melbourne, and a further twelve were built by Phoenix Foundry of Ballarat in 1882–83.

All twenty-six were added to the main Victorian Railways register (see below).

==== Victorian Railways (VR) 1886–1906 ====
The South Suburban system was finally incorporated into the Victorian Railways register on 1 January 1886 along with the introduction of the letter classification system. As there were already locomotives with the same numbers, these older locomotives were given the next available numbers; 42, 262–310 (even only) and became known as the C class.

==== Motor service ====
In 1904, C272, C282, C286, C294, C296, C306 were modified for motor running, while C284 was also converted at a later date. This involved the addition of handrails and footboards to allow guards to return to the engine while the train was moving, as well as cowcatchers.

=== Design improvements ===
Over the years they were fitted with various alterations to the cabs. There were also various upgrades over the years; with constant improvements to safety — these including things like updates to safety valves (and domes), smokeboxes and chimneys (with spark arrestors), and brakes.

=== Accidents ===
- 2 December 1882 - South Sub 32 collided with R191 at Hawthorn
- 11 May 1887 - C266 was on the ordinary train involved in the Windsor accident
- 1888 - C288 broke trailing axle
- 1890 - C310 broke leading axle
- 16 April 1909 - C310 broke leading axle
- 1 December 1909 - C286 broke trailing axle at Hartwell

=== Demise ===
All were scrapped. The first was withdrawn on 9 April 1904 and the last on 19 February 1916. C266 was used as a washing out engine in 1900, and was at North Melbourne until 7 February 1906 when C310 was similarly equipped and took over.

== Fleet summary ==
Key:	In service	Preserved	Stored or withdrawn	Scrapped	‡ = Also M&HBUR system

VR No.	South Suburban No.	Builder no.	Entered service	Withdrawn	Scrapped	Status	Notes
C42	38	109	11 October 1883	1 June 1907		Scrapped	Became C42 on the VR
C262	1	98	November 1882	1 June 1907		Scrapped	Became C262 on the VR
C264	2	99	December 1882	20 August 1904		Scrapped	Became C264 on the VR
C266	3	100	December 1882	11 June 1904		Scrapped	Became C266 on the VR. Used as a washing out engine at North Melbourne - 11 June 1904
C268	4	101	3 February 1882	10 February 1906		Scrapped	Became C268 on the VR
C270	12	104	24 August 1883	4 June 1904		Scrapped	Became C270 on the VR
C272	14	105	31 August 1883	16 November 1909		Scrapped	Became C272 on the VR
C274	17	102	June 1883	25 May 1907		Scrapped	Became C274 on the VR
C276	18	103	27 April 1883	16 April 1904		Scrapped	Became C276 on the VR
C278	20‡	1995	August 1871	9 May 1908		Scrapped	To South Suburban - 1878. Became C278 on the VR
C280	21‡	2123	May 1874	26 August 1904		Scrapped	To South Suburban - 1878. Became C280 on the VR
C282	22‡	2130	September 1875	23 April 1910		Scrapped	To South Suburban - 1878. Became C282 on the VR
C284	23‡	2214	October 1875	21 January 1908		Scrapped	To South Suburban - 1878. Became C284 on the VR
C286	25‡	2328	April 1878	17 December 1913		Scrapped	To South Suburban - 1878. Became C286 on the VR
C288	26‡	2329	April 1878	28 May 1904		Scrapped	To South Suburban - 1878. Became C288 on the VR
C290	27	1	July 1880	21 May 1904		Scrapped	Became C290 on the VR
C292	28	2	August 1880	9 April 1904		Scrapped	Became C292 on the VR
C294	29	3	October 1880	19 February 1916		Scrapped	Became C294 on the VR. Used by Construction Branch - 30 September 1912
C296	30	4	November 1880	23 March 1907		Scrapped	Became C296 on the VR
C298	31	5	December 1880	26 August 1904		Scrapped	Became C298 on the VR
C300	32	6	January 1881	16 July 1904		Scrapped	Became C300 on the VR
C302	33	7	March 1881	4 June 1904		Scrapped	Became C302 on the VR
C304	34	8	April 1881	20 August 1904		Scrapped	Became C304 on the VR
C306	35	106	14 September 1883	2 December 1905		Scrapped	Became C306 on the VR
C308	36	107	21 September 1883	9 July 1904		Scrapped	Became C308 on the VR
C310	37	108	5 October 1883	February 1906		Scrapped	Became C310 on the VR. Used as a washing out engine at North Melbourne - 7 February 1906
