= Windsor railway station, Melbourne =

Railway station in Melbourne, Australia

Windsor
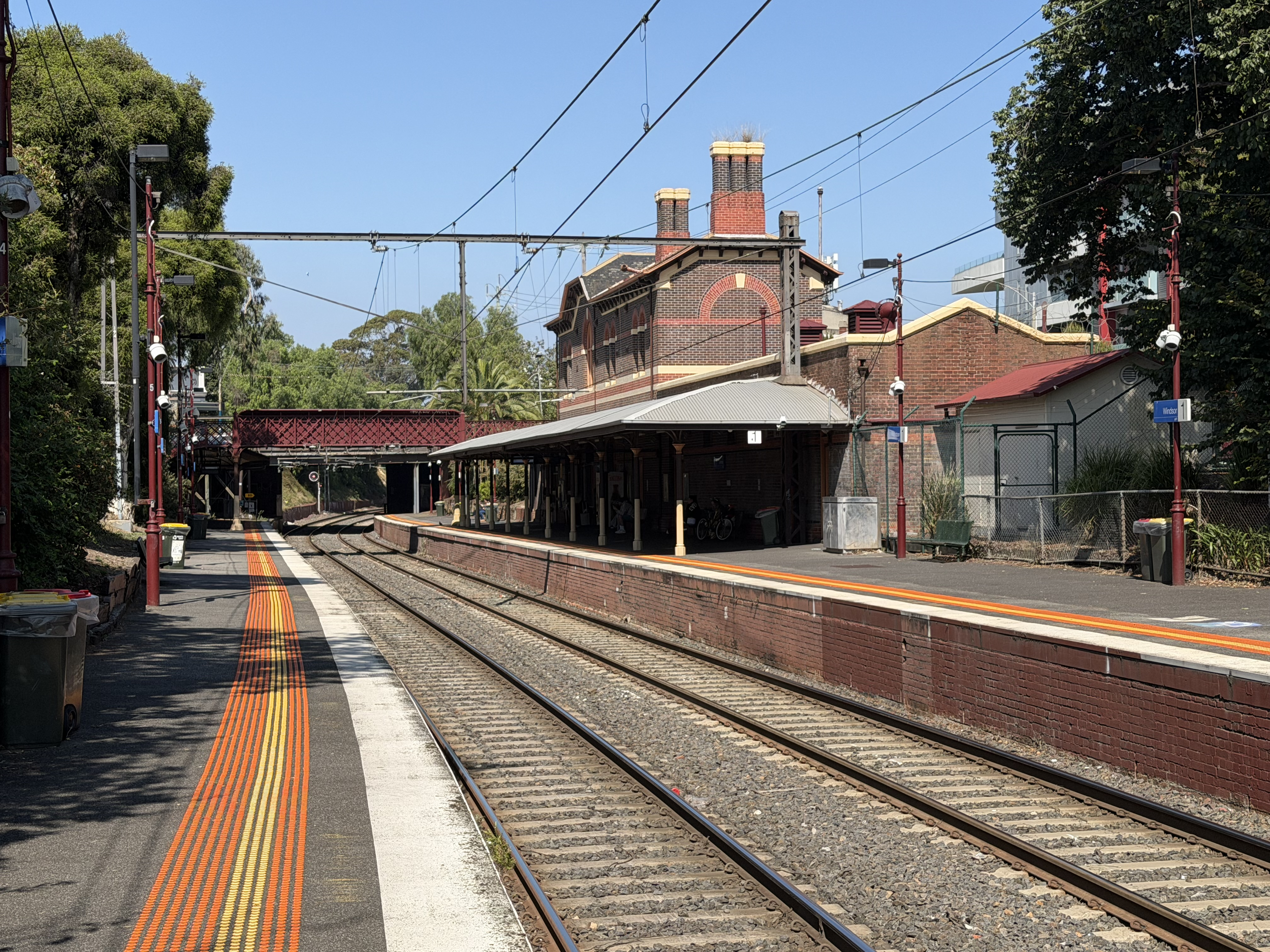
- South-east bound view of Platform 2, March 2026

General information
- Location: Chapel Street, Windsor, Victoria 3181; City of Stonnington; Australia
- Coordinates: 37°51′22″S 144°59′31″E
- System: PTV commuter rail station
- Owner: VicTrack
- Operator: Metro Trains
- Line: Sandringham
- Distance: 7.49 kilometres from Southern Cross
- Platforms: 2 side
- Tracks: 2
- Connections: Tram

Construction
- Structure type: Ground
- Accessible: No—steep ramp

Other information
- Status: Operational, host station
- Station code: WIN
- Fare zone: Myki zone 1
- Website: Public Transport Victoria

History
- Opened: 19 December 1859; 166 years ago
- Electrified: May 1919 (1500 V DC overhead)
- Former names: Chapel Street (1859-1866)

Passengers
- 2005–2006: 847,514
- 2006–2007: 975,155 ▲15.06%
- 2007–2008: 1,037,062 ▲6.34%
- 2008–2009: 965,600 ▼6.89%
- 2009–2010: 1,025,300 ▲6.18%
- 2010–2011: 1,066,928 ▲4.06%
- 2011–2012: 1,067,217 ▲0.02%
- 2012–2013: Not measured
- 2013–2014: 1,054,161 ▼1.22%
- 2014–2015: 1,046,717 ▼0.7%
- 2015–2016: 1,085,153 ▲3.67%
- 2016–2017: 1,110,869 ▲2.36%
- 2017–2018: 1,114,793 ▲0.35%
- 2018–2019: 915,797 ▼17.85%
- 2019–2020: 714,100 ▼22.02%
- 2020–2021: 334,200 ▼53.2%
- 2021–2022: 375,950 ▲12.49%

Services
| Preceding station | Metro Trains | Following station |
|---|---|---|
| Prahran towards Laverton, Werribee or Williamstown via Flinders Street | Sandringham line | Balaclava towards Sandringham |
Former services
| St Kilda | St Kilda - Windsor railway line | Junction |
| | List of closed railway stations in Melbourne | |
Track layout
Location

Windsor station is a railway station operated by Metro Trains Melbourne on the Sandringham line, part of the Melbourne rail network. It serves the south-eastern suburb of Windsor, in Melbourne, Victoria, Australia. Windsor station is a ground level host station, featuring two side platforms. It opened on 19 December 1859.

Initially opened as Chapel Street, the station was given its current name of Windsor on 1 January 1867.

The station is listed on the Victorian Heritage Register.

== History ==
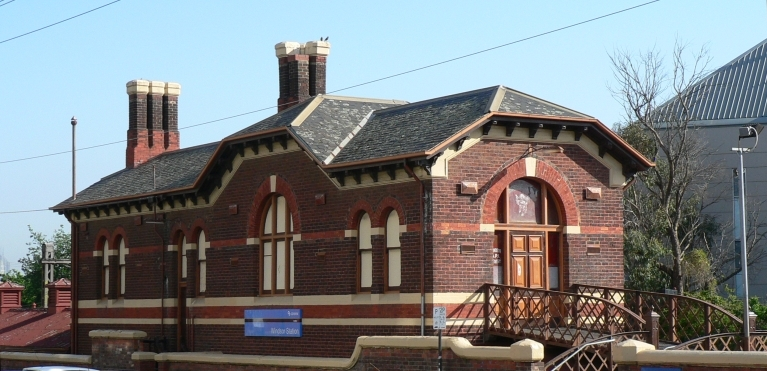
Heritage listed station building on Platform 1 side, October 2006

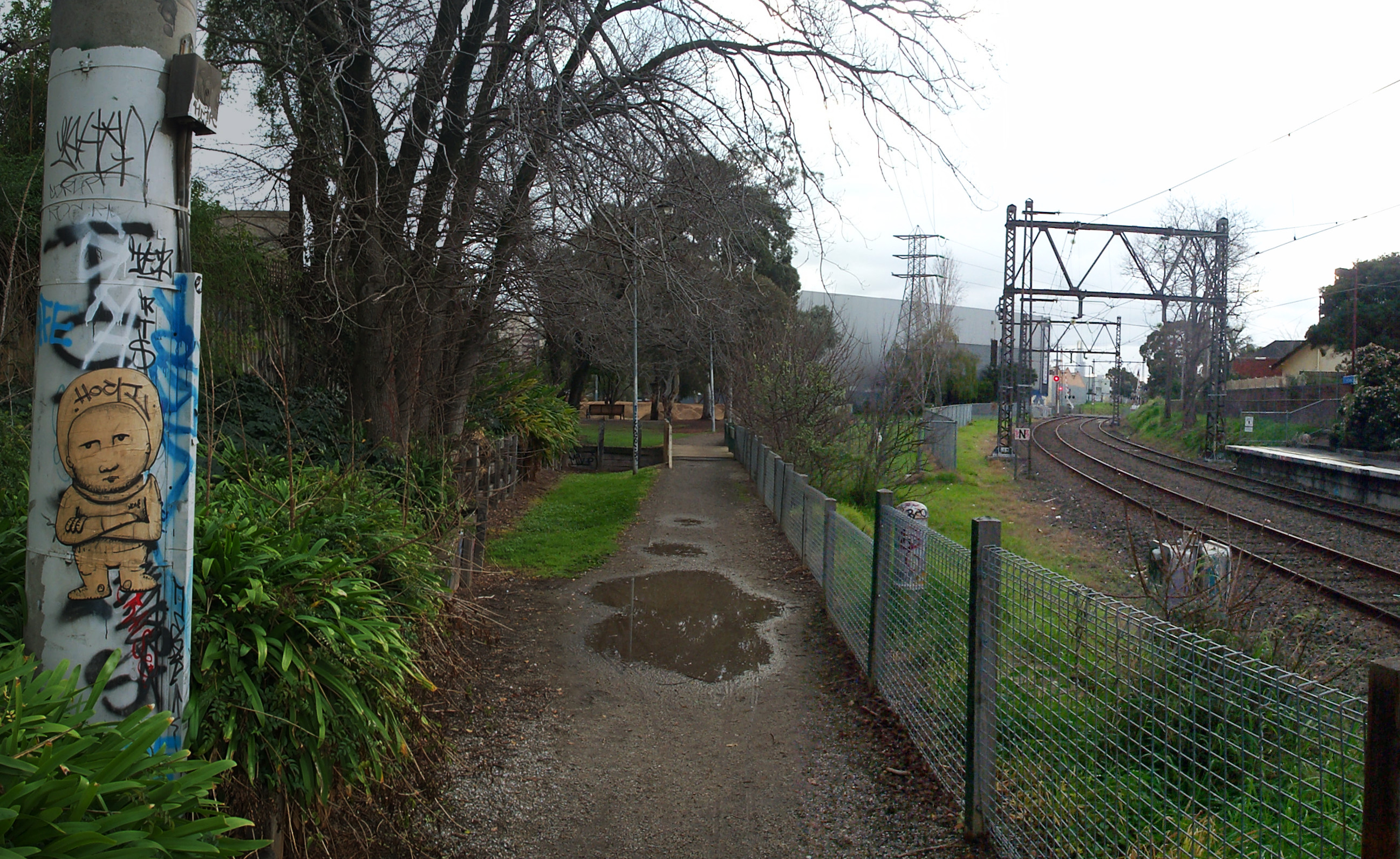
Windsor Siding reserve, June 2008

=== Link to St Kilda ===
The station was the terminus for services on the Brighton Beach line, which opened in 1859, and operated by the St Kilda & Brighton Railway Company. The company also built the loop branch line, connecting the Brighton line to the Melbourne – St Kilda line, which opened in 1857.

Services from Melbourne travelled to the St Kilda terminus, and then "backed out" onto the loop line to Windsor. The loop ran on timber trestles across the swampy ground now known as Albert Park Lake, and included a raised embankment, with a bridge over St Kilda Road. On 3 December 1859, the first train on the loop ran, with the line opening to the public ten days later. There were no trains after 7pm on the branch line, so passengers had to walk from St Kilda to their homes in Prahran.

A short time after the loop line was constructed, a direct connection was built between South Yarra and Windsor, with the first train arriving at Windsor directly from Melbourne on 24 November 1860. As a consequence, the loop line to St Kilda fell into disuse, and track duplication, a condition of the original crown lease, was never completed.

=== Sidings ===
The St Kilda and Brighton Railway Company experienced financial difficulties and, in 1862, was bought by the Melbourne and Suburban Railway Company. The track, bridge and trestles between St Kilda and Punt Road were dismantled, but a short section was retained as a siding at Windsor. Due to the track alignments, there were two level crossings within 100 metres on Union Street, because the siding continued to be used for shunting trains from the Brighton line, and to carry screenings from the Richmond quarries to a commercial depot on Punt Road (then known as Hoddle Street).

Perversely, it was due to local annoyance at the siding level crossing near the station that trains won the legal right-of-way at road-rail intersections in Victoria. Indignant at the delays to horse-drawn traffic caused by trains, and in particular the perpetually closed and unstaffed crossing at the siding, local councillors from Prahran marched to the level crossing in question one morning in 1869, with a group of workers who began to rip up the tracks on the siding. On 17 April of that year, the matter was brought to court and, although the railways won the right-of-way case, the siding was not reconstructed.

No evidence of the bridge over St Kilda Road or the embankments remain, although the alignment of the loop can be traced by the residual parkland and some oddly-shaped property boundaries. A small park to the west of Windsor is called "Windsor Siding".

=== 1887 accident ===
On the evening of 11 May 1887, an express train collided into the rear of a stopping all stations train between Prahran and Windsor. Four people were killed and over 100 severely injured. The all stations train had been halted short of Windsor by a signal. When the signal to proceed was given, the driver could not release the brakes on his train due to a ruptured air pipe. An express train from Melbourne was scheduled 10 minutes behind the stopping train and, due to a curve in the track and a deep cutting, the crew of the express could not see the stationary train ahead. Cooper (1924) reported that the noise of the impact could be heard throughout Prahran and that, in a short time, over 10,000 people were gathered at the site. The driver of the Brighton express, Frederick William Maskell, was killed, along with his fireman, James Houston McNab, William Runting, aged 21, and Annie Foster, aged 45, of Colac. Only weeks earlier, Maskell had received a special reward of £5 from the Railways Commissioners for his alertness in averting an accident after another driver had disregarded a signal.

=== 20th century ===
In February 1972, the overhead wiring above No. 1 road was removed.

The goods yard existed at the up end of the station, until its closure in December 1977.

During 1979, a crossover and connections to the former goods yard were spiked out of use, and a number of dwarf signals were abolished. In October of that year, automatic semaphore signals were replaced with light signals between Windsor and Prahran.

In 1983, boom barriers replaced interlocked gates at the Union Street level crossing, located at the up end of the station. The signal box for the level crossing was also abolished during this time.

=== 21st century ===
On 4 May 2010, as part of the 2010/2011 State Budget, $83.7 million was allocated to upgrade Windsor to a premium station, along with nineteen others. However, in March 2011, this was scrapped by the Baillieu Government.

== Platforms and services ==
Windsor has two side platforms. It is served by Sandringham line trains.

Windsor platform arrangement
| Platform | Line | Destination | Via | Service Type | Notes | Source |
|---|---|---|---|---|---|---|
| 1 | Sandringham line | Laverton, Werribee or Williamstown | Flinders Street | All stations | Services to Laverton and Williamstown only operate on weekdays. | |
| 2 | Sandringham line | Sandringham | | All stations | | |

== Transport links ==
Yarra Trams operates three routes via Windsor station:

- : Melbourne University – Malvern
- : Melbourne University – East Brighton
- : North Richmond – Balaclava
