= List of former government railway authorities of Australia =

This is a list of former government railway authorities of Australia – often known colloquially in the different states as The Government Railways, and The State Railways.

For former non-government companies see List of former Australian railway companies

== National ==
- Commonwealth Railways
- Australian National Railways Commission
- National Rail Corporation

== New South Wales ==
- New South Wales Government Railways
- Public Transport Commission
- State Rail Authority
- FreightCorp

== Queensland ==
- Queensland Railways

== South Australia ==
- South Australian Railways
- State Transport Authority
- TransAdelaide

== Tasmania ==
- Tasmanian Government Railways
- AN Tasrail

== Victoria ==
- Victorian Railways
- State Transport Authority
- Metropolitan Transit Authority
- Public Transport Corporation

== Western Australia ==
- Metropolitan Transport Trust
- Western Australian Government Railways
- Westrail
- Western Australian Government Railways Commission

== See also ==
- Rail transport in Australia
- History of rail transport in Australia
