= Melbourne Railway Company =

Railway company in Melbourne, Victoria

- Industry: Rail transport
- Predecessors: Melbourne and Suburban Railway Company; St Kilda and Brighton Railway Company
- Founded: 31 March 1862 in Melbourne, Australia
- Defunct: 30 June 1865
- Fate: Merger
- Successor: Melbourne and Hobson's Bay United Railway Company
- Headquarters: Australia
- Area served: Melbourne
- Services: Railway construction and operations

The Melbourne Railway Company was formed in 1859 to construct and run a railway from Melbourne to Windsor, where it connected with the St Kilda and Brighton Railway.

Previously, the Brighton line had branched off the end of the St Kilda Railway, requiring a reverse loop. The Melbourne Company line provided a more direct route into the city via Richmond and Princes Bridge. The Melbourne Railway Company purchased the Melbourne and Suburban Railway Company in 1862, and the St Kilda and Brighton Railway Company and was amalgamated with the Melbourne and Hobson's Bay Railway Company to form the Melbourne and Hobson's Bay United Railway Company on 22 October 1864. Subsequently, all these railway businesses were acquired by the government-owned Victorian Railways in 1878.

== Rolling stock ==
=== Locomotives ===
Class	Wheel arrangement	Fleet number(s)	Manufacturer Serial numbers	Year introduced	Total	Total preserved	Year(s) withdrawn	Comments
M&HBR 2-4-0WT	2-4-0WT	Melbourne*, Victoria, Yarra*	Robert Stephenson & Co. 954, 956, 957	1862 (ex M&SR)	3*	0	1865	All to Melbourne & Hobson's Bay United Railway; *Melbourne & Yarra owned by SK&BR but used by MRC
G&MR 0-6-0WT	0-6-0WT	Hercules	R&W Hawthorn; 928	1862 (ex M&SR)	1	0	1865	To Melbourne & Hobson's Bay United Railway
M&SR 2-4-0T	2-4-0T	Hawthorn, Richmond	George England & Co. 160, 161	1862 (ex M&SR)	2	0	1865	To Melbourne & Hobson's Bay United Railway
M&SR 2-4-0WT	2-4-0WT	Kew	Robert Stephenson & Co. 1377	1862 (ex M&SR)	1	0	1865	To Melbourne & Hobson's Bay United Railway
MRC 2-4-0WT	2-4-0WT	Prahran, Windsor	Robert Stephenson & Co. 1459, 1460	1963	2	0	1865	All to Melbourne & Hobson's Bay United Railway

Companies
Preceded by Melbourne and Suburban Railway Company 31 March 1862	Melbourne Railway Company; 31 March 1862 – 30 June 1865	Succeeded by Melbourne and Hobson's Bay United Railway Company
Preceded by St Kilda and Brighton Railway Company Operations; 1 May 1862	Melbourne Railway Company; 31 March 1862 – 30 June 1865	Succeeded by Melbourne and Hobson's Bay United Railway Company
