= South Australian Railways F class (1902) =

South Australian Railways 4-6-2T locomotives of 1902

South Australian Railways F class of 1902 ("2nd F class")
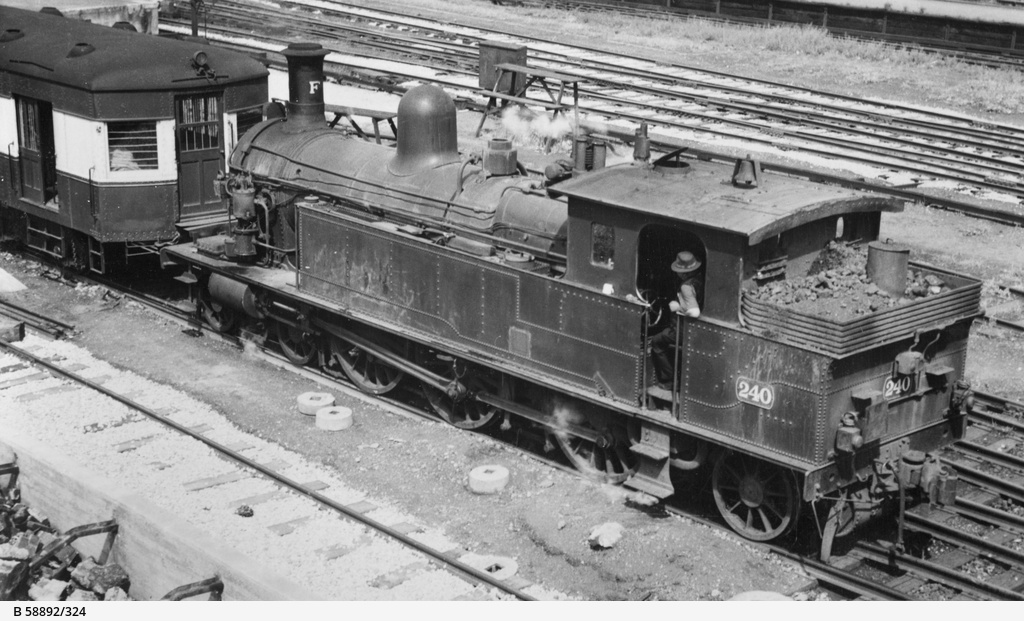
- F class locomotive no. 240 in 1952
Type and origin
- Power type: Steam
- Builder: Islington Workshops (21); James Martin & Co (12); Perry Engineering (10)
- Build date: 1902–1922
- Total produced: 43
Specifications
- Configuration
  - Whyte: 4-6-2T 1'C2'
- Gauge: 1600 mm (5 ft 3 in)
- Leading dia.: 2 ft 11 in (889 mm)
- Driver dia.: 5 ft 3 in (1600 mm)
- Trailing dia.: 3 ft 6 in (1067 mm)
- Length: 40 ft 7.25 in (12.38 m)
- Height: 13 ft 3 in (4038.6 mm)
- Axle load: 12 long tons 6 cwt (27,600 lb or 12.5 t)
- Adhesive weight: 35.25 long tons 0 cwt (79,000 lb or 35.8 t)
- Loco weight: 59 long tons (66 short tons; 60 t)
- Fuel type: Coal; Oil
- Fuel capacity: 2.25 long tons (3 short tons; 2 t); 375 imp gal (450 US gal; 1,705 L) oil
- Water cap.: 1160 imp gal (1393 US gal; 5273 L)
- Firebox
  - Grate area: 18 sq ft (1.7 m^{2})
- Boiler pressure: 185 psi (1276 kPa)
- Heating surface
  - Firebox: 130.7 sq ft (12.14 m^{2})
  - Tubes: 1204 sq ft (111.9 m^{2})
- Cylinders: 2
- Cylinder size: 17 1/2 in × 24 in (444 mm × 610 mm)
- Valve gear: Allan straight link
- Valve type: Piston
Performance figures
- Tractive effort: 18,335 lbf (81.56 kN)
- Factor of adh.: 4.35
Career
- Operators: South Australian Railways
- Class: F (distinguished from the 1896 1st F class)
- Number in class: 43
- Numbers: 167–189, 236–255
- First run: 30 April 1902
- Withdrawn: 1955–1969
- Preserved: 245, 251, 255
- Scrapped: 1956–1968
- Disposition: 3 preserved, 41 scrapped

The South Australian Railways F class is a class of 4-6-2T steam locomotives operated by the South Australian Railways.

== History ==
The F class hauled the majority of Adelaide's suburban passenger trains after its introduction in 1902. The first 22 were built by the Islington Railway Workshops. James Martin & Co built 12 units, and Perry Engineering built the remaining 10, the last entering service in October 1922.

The F class replaced another class of tank locomotives, the smaller P class (2-4-0T), which were struggling with the increasing sizes of suburban passenger trains. From the 1930s on lightly patronised routes, F class locomotives were replaced by Brill model 55 and 75 railcars. They continued to be deployed on busier suburban routes until they were displaced after 1955 by increasing numbers of 300 and 400 class "Red Hen" railcars. Some locomotives were retained for shunting duties at Port Adelaide and Mile End. F225, the final member of the class to operate, was condemned in 1969.

The locomotives had saturated steam boilers and were considered attractive. While slow to accelerate away from stations, the locomotives were capable of reaching speeds of up to 60 mph (100 km/h). They were a capable locomotive that faced few restrictions other than on the Belair line in the Adelaide Hills, on which they were limited to hauling three carriages.

== Preserved examples ==
Three members of the class have been preserved:

- F177 (re-numbered to 245): under a shelter at Gawler railway station
- F251: in storage at SteamRanger Heritage Railway
- F255: on static display at the National Railway Museum, Port Adelaide.
Gallery
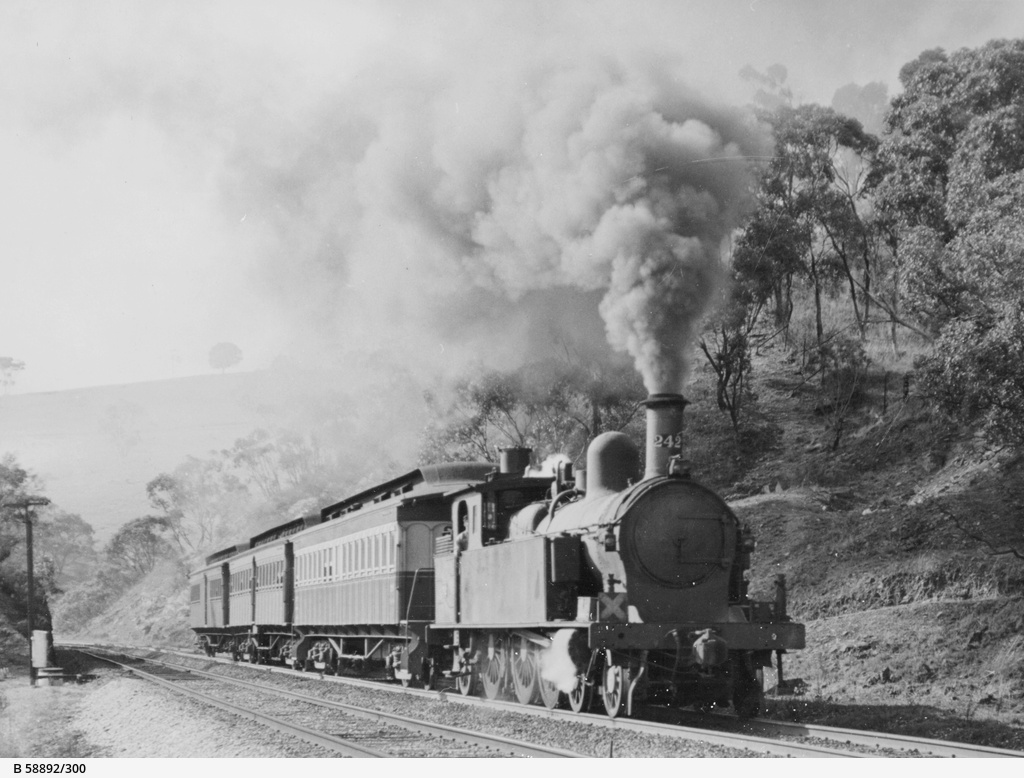
F242 hauling a passenger train at Eden Hills in 1952

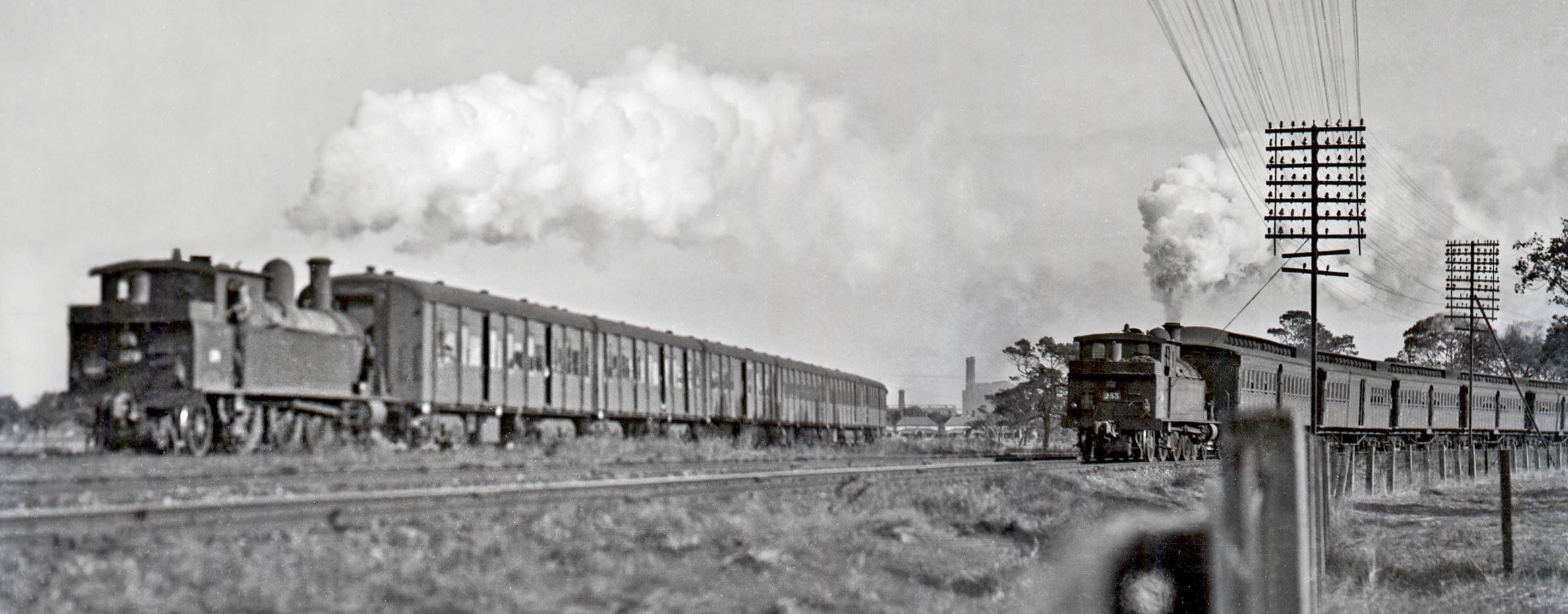
F class locos hauling the SAR's two types of suburban cars

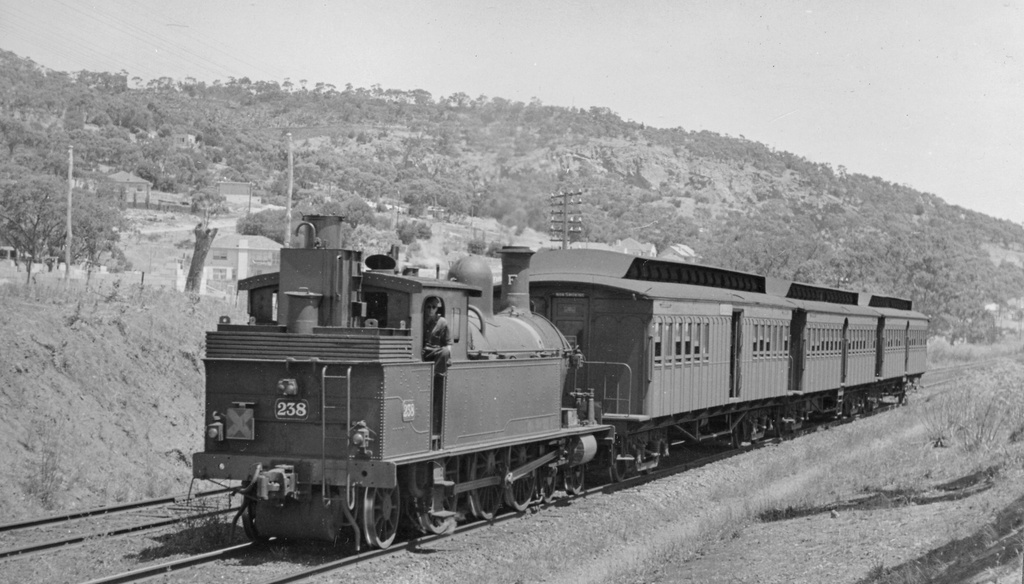
F242 hauling a passenger train at Clapham in 1952

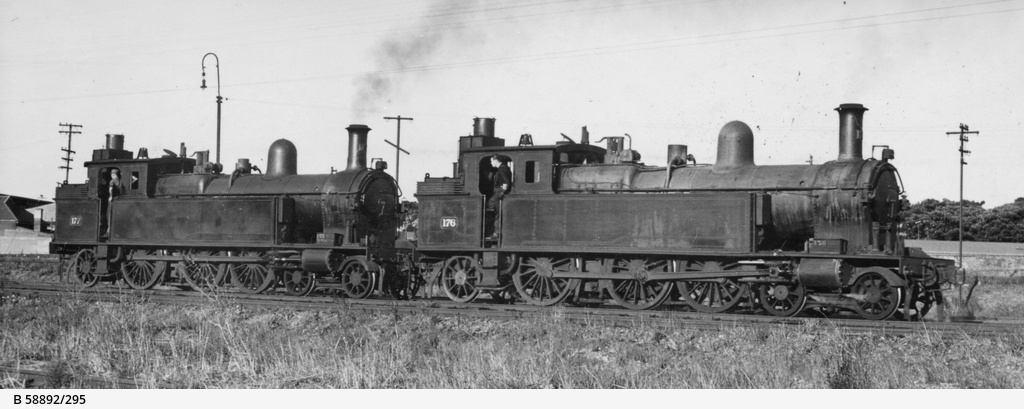
F176 and F177 in 1951
