= South Australian Railways F class (1869) =

South Australian Railways 4-4-0 locomotives of 1869

South Australian Railways F class of 1869 ("1st F class")
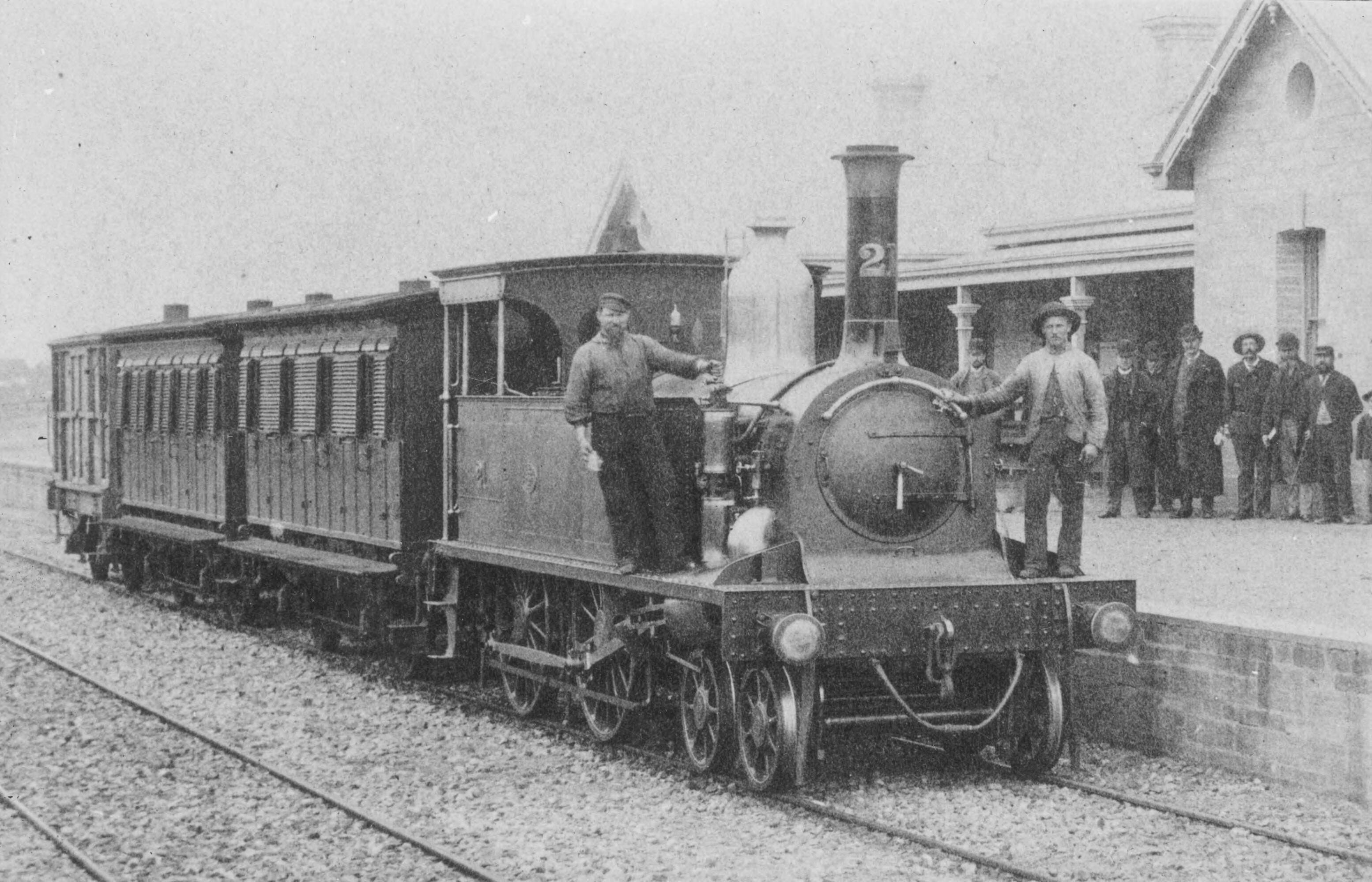
- SAR "first F class" locomotive no. 21 at Nairne station in the Adelaide Hills, about 1884
Type and origin
- Power type: Steam
- Builder: Avonside Engine Company
- Order number: 773, 774
- Build date: 1869
- Total produced: 2
- Rebuilder: South Australian Railways
- Rebuild date: 1880
- Number rebuilt: 2
Specifications
- Configuration
  - Whyte: 4-4-0T
  - UIC: 2'B T
- Gauge: 1600 mm (5 ft 3 in)
- Driver dia.: 4 ft 11 1/2 in (1511 mm)
- Loco weight: 30 long tons 16 cwt (69,000 lb or 31.3 t)
- Fuel type: Coal
- Boiler pressure: 130 psi (896 kPa)
- Cylinders: 2
- Cylinder size: 14 in × 22 in (356 mm × 559 mm)
- Valve gear: Stephenson
Performance figures
- Tractive effort: 9500 lbf (42 kN)
Career
- Operators: South Australian Railways
- Class: F (distinguished from the 1902 2nd F class)
- Number in class: 2
- Numbers: 21 and 22
- First run: 1869
- Withdrawn: 1892
- Disposition: Both scrapped

The two 4-4-0T steam locomotives that together comprised the first South Australian Railways F class were built in England in 1869 by the Avonside Engine Company of Bristol. No. 21 entered service on the South Australian Railways in September 1869; no. 22 followed in October.

The locomotives had a copper-capped chimney, a highly polished brass dome and brass boiler bands encircling the barrel and around the outer firebox corners. In keeping with other locomotives of this period, they would have been painted green with a black smokebox.

The initial role of the F class was to take over the role of hauling goods trains from A class locomotives on the new line from Roseworthy to Forresters (later named Tarlee) and to Burra from August 1870. Subsequently they operated on the Port Adelaide and in the Adelaide hills, where they pulled passenger and goods trains. Near the end of their short working life they shunted in the Adelaide Yards. In 1892, the engines were being rebuilt when a workshop crane lifted them without using hornplates, dropping and seriously damaging them in the process; they were declared to be beyond repair and scrapped afterwards.

Ten years later, in 1902, a second group of locomotives, a suburban tank with a 4-6-2 wheel arrangement, took on the "F" class classification. On the rare occasions when it was necessary to distinguish them, the latter locomotives were termed the "2nd F class".
