= Princes Bridge railway station =

Closed railway station in Melbourne CBD, Victoria, Australia

Princes Bridge
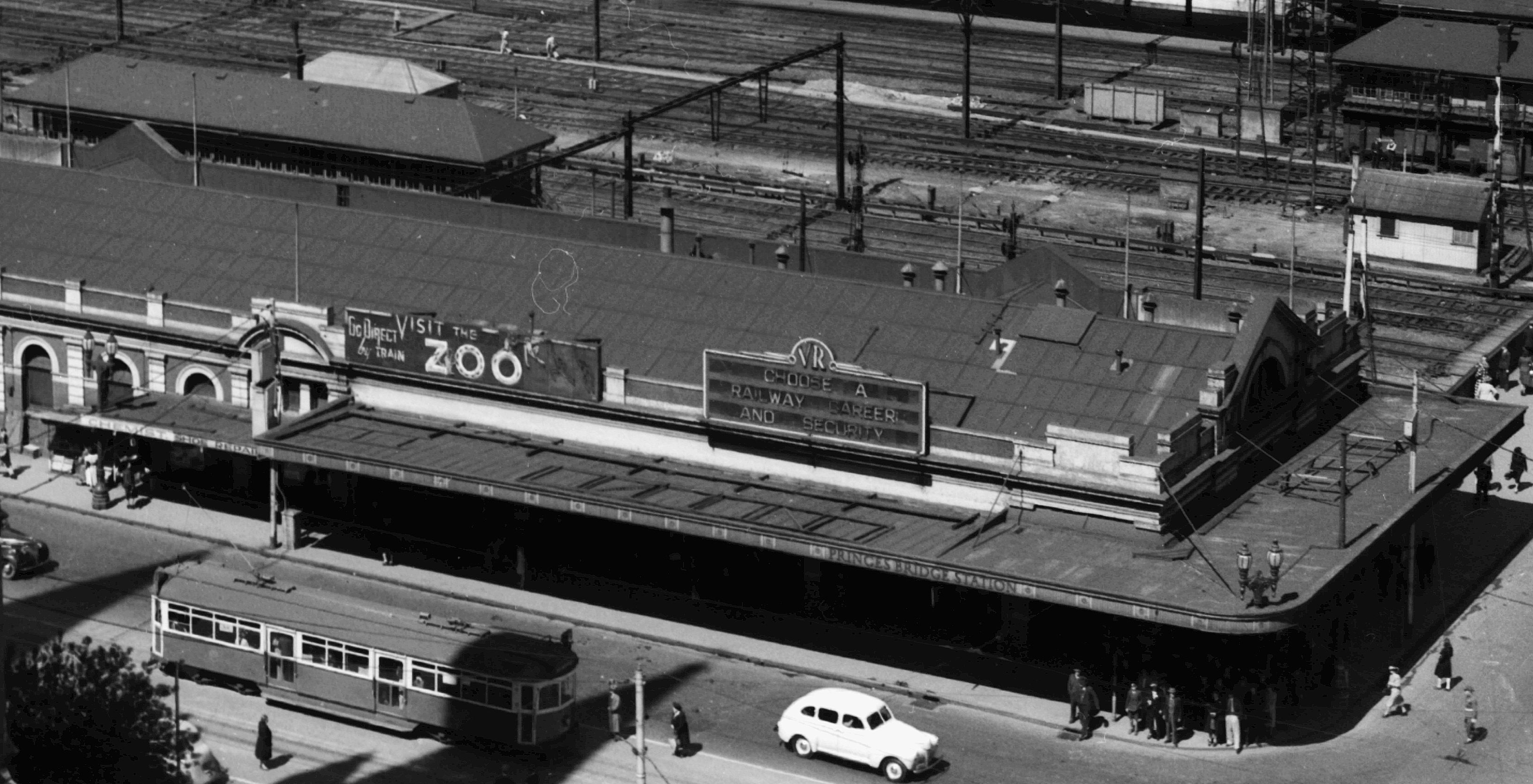
- View of station from above in 1947

General information
- Coordinates: 37°49′04″S 144°58′08″E
- System: Closed commuter rail station
- Lines: City Loop; Epping line Hurstbridge line
- Distance: 1.3 kilometres from Southern Cross
- Platforms: 3 (1 island, 1 side)
- Tracks: 3

Other information
- Status: Subsumed into Flinders Street
- Fare zone: 1

History
- Opened: 8 February 1859
- Closed: February 14th 1997

Former services
Preceding station	MetRail	Following station
Terminus	Epping line	Jolimont towards Epping, Eltham or Hurstbridge
Terminus	Hurstbridge line	Jolimont towards Epping, Eltham or Hurstbridge
List of closed railway stations in Melbourne
Track layout
Layout at closure (1997)
Location

Princes Bridge was a Melbourne railway station built in 1859 and was the terminus for all trains on what are now the Mernda and Hurstbridge lines. The station was named after the adjacent Princes Bridge, which crosses the Yarra River. Originally Princes Bridge station was isolated from Flinders Street station, even though it was adjacent to it, sited just on the opposite side of Swanston Street. Some years later the railway tracks were extended under the street to join the two stations, and Princes Bridge slowly became amalgamated into the larger Flinders Street station. This process was completed in May 1997.

== History ==
Originally known as Prince's Bridge (as was the bridge itself), the station was opened as the city terminus of the Melbourne and Suburban Railway Company line to Punt Road (Richmond) in 1859. Extended to Prahran in 1859 and Windsor in 1860, it formed today's Sandringham line. A small engine shed was built east of the station in 1859 by the company. A locomotive depot later replaced it on a new site in 1888, which was demolished to make way for the Jolimont Workshops in 1917, as part of the electrification of the suburban rail network.

The Hobson's Bay, Melbourne and St Kilda and Brighton railway companies merged into the Hobson's Bay United Railway Company in mid-1865. The three systems were connected at Flinders Street station in October 1865 and Princes Bridge station was closed. It was reopened on 2 April 1879, when the Railways Department began to use it as the terminus of the newly opened Gippsland Railway. The City Morgue was located close to the station entrance on Swanston Street, until it was acquired by the railways and demolished in 1890. The direct rail connection between Princes Bridge and Clifton Hill station was not opened until October 1901. Before that, trains from the north-eastern suburbs used the indirect route of the Inner Circle line via Fitzroy to reach Spencer Street Station.

By 1910, the two stations were effectively joined together, although they retained their separate names. There were three platforms at Princes Bridge. One was an extension of Flinders Street platform 1 ("platform 1 East"), while the other two served an island platform, with the tracks being numbered 15 and 16. Track 15 was a dead end, but track 16 (the northernmost one) had a traverser between it and a parallel run around siding, which allowed steam locomotives to change ends. A footbridge provided pedestrian access to the east end of the island platform from Flinders Street, with the 'Flinders Street D' signal box located beyond it. Further north-east of the main lines to Jolimont was a locomotive siding and a coal stage, and a carriage siding was located to the south-east. By 1957, the sidings had been rationalised, with the locomotive facilities and traverser removed. The sidings now formed part of Jolimont Yard.

The original Princes Bridge station buildings were demolished to make way for the Princes Gate Towers, which later became known as the Gas & Fuel towers. The station itself was retained, with new tracks and platforms commissioned in December 1964. On 29 June 1980, Princes Bridge station was merged with Flinders Street Station as platforms 14, 15 and 16. By 1975, the track had been simplified to run into platform 14, 15 and 16 only, and was further simplified by 1982 due to the construction nearby of the City Circle portal of the City Loop railway.

From 6 December 1981 until 23 August 1993, a train service called "City Circle" originated at the station. This train ran in a circle around the City Loop, stopping at all stations, before returning to Princes Bridge. It was replaced by the City Circle tram in mid-1994.

In 1994, the Premier of the State Government Jeff Kennett announced that the Gas and Fuel towers were to be demolished to make way for a cultural precinct to be called Federation Square. The site for the project was also to include most of the space of the former Princes Bridge station, with Epping and Hurstbridge trains redirected to platform 1/14, to run via the City Loop. Piling works and crash walls for Federation Square were completed by October 1998, with the deck above finished by mid-1999. Building works atop the deck commenced in August 1999. The space of platforms 15 and 16 of the former station is now a large basement gallery space for temporary exhibitions of the Australian Centre for the Moving Image.
