= Melbourne and Suburban Railway Company =

Railway company in Melbourne, Victoria

The Melbourne and Suburban Railway Company was a railway company in Victoria, Australia. The company opened a line from Princes Bridge railway station in Melbourne, Australia to Punt Road (Richmond) and over the Yarra River to South Yarra (then called Gardiners Creek Road) in 1859, with extensions south to Prahran in 1859 and Windsor in 1860, connecting with the 1859 St Kilda and Brighton Railway Company's line from St Kilda to Bay Street (now North Brighton), which was extended to Beach Station (now Brighton Beach) in 1861. They also built an eastward extension to Hawthorn by 1861. This company ran into difficulties almost immediately, and was bought by the Melbourne Railway Company in 1862.

The Melbourne (and Suburban) Railway Company and the St Kilda and Brighton Railway Company were amalgamated with the Melbourne and Hobson's Bay Railway Company on 22 October 1864. The combined company, known as the Melbourne and Hobsons Bay United Railway Company, was taken over by the Government of Victoria in 1878 and it became part of Victorian Railways.

== Rolling stock ==
=== Locomotives ===
Class	Wheel arrangement	Fleet number(s)	Manufacturer Serial numbers	Year introduced	Total	Total preserved	Year(s) withdrawn	Comments
M&HBR 2-4-0WT || 2-4-0WT	Victoria	Robert Stephenson & Co. 956	1858 (ex M&HBR)	1	0	1862	To Melbourne Railway Company	
G&MR 0-6-0WT	0-6-0WT	Hercules	R&W Hawthorn; 928	1858 (ex G&MR)	1	0	1862	To Melbourne Railway Company
M&SR 2-4-0T	2-4-0T	Hawthorn, Richmond	George England & Co. 160, 161	1862	2	0	1862	All to Melbourne Railway Company
M&SR 2-4-0WT || 2-4-0WT	Kew, #1378*	Robert Stephenson & Co. 1377, 1378	1861	2*	0	1862	To Melbourne Railway Company *#1378 could not be paid for and sold to Cornish & Bruce	

Companies
First	Melbourne and Suburban Railway Company; 24 November 1857 – 31 March 1862	Succeeded by Melbourne Railway Company
