= St Kilda and Brighton Railway Company =

Railway company in Melbourne, Victoria

- Industry: Rail transport
- Founded: 24 November 1857 in Victoria, Australia
- Defunct: 30 September 1865
- Fate: Merger
- Successor: Melbourne and Hobson's Bay United Railway Company
- Headquarters: Australia
- Area served: Victoria and Melbourne
- Key people: Charles Ebden
- Services: Railway construction and operations

The St Kilda and Brighton Railway Company was a railway company in Victoria, Australia. The company opened a line from St Kilda Railway Station (via an elevated loop) in Melbourne, Australia to Bay Street (now North Brighton) in 1859 and Beach (now Brighton Beach) in 1861.

In November 1853, a bill was introduced in the Legislative Council of Victoria for incorporation of a company to be called the "Melbourne, St. Kilda and Brighton Railway Company". Then, in December 1855, it was announced that another bill would be presented to the Parliament of Victoria to incorporate the "St. Kilda and Brighton Railway Company". Charles Ebden was chairman of directors of the company.

The St Kilda and Brighton Railway Company and the more extensive Melbourne (and Suburban) Railway Company, with lines to Prahran and Hawthorn, were taken over by the Melbourne and Hobson's Bay Railway Company in 1864. The combined company, known as the Melbourne and Hobsons Bay United Railway Company, was taken over by the Government of Victoria in 1878 and the lines became part of the Victorian Railways.

== Rolling stock ==
=== Locomotives ===
Class	Wheel arrangement	Fleet number(s)	Manufacturer Serial numbers	Year introduced	Total	Total preserved	Year(s) withdrawn	Comments
M&HBR 2-4-0WT	2-4-0WT	Melbourne, Yarra	Robert Stephenson & Co. 954, 957	1862 (ex M&HBR)	2	0	1862	All used by Melbourne Railway Company, but later sold to the Melbourne & Hobson's Bay United Railway

Companies
First	St Kilda and Brighton Railway Company; 24 November 1857 – 1 September 1865	Succeeded by Melbourne Railway Company Operations; 1 May 1862
First	St Kilda and Brighton Railway Company; 24 November 1857 – 1 September 1865	Succeeded by Melbourne and Hobson's Bay United Railway Company Company; 1 September 1865
