= Melbourne and Hobson's Bay Railway Company =

Railway company in Victoria, Australia

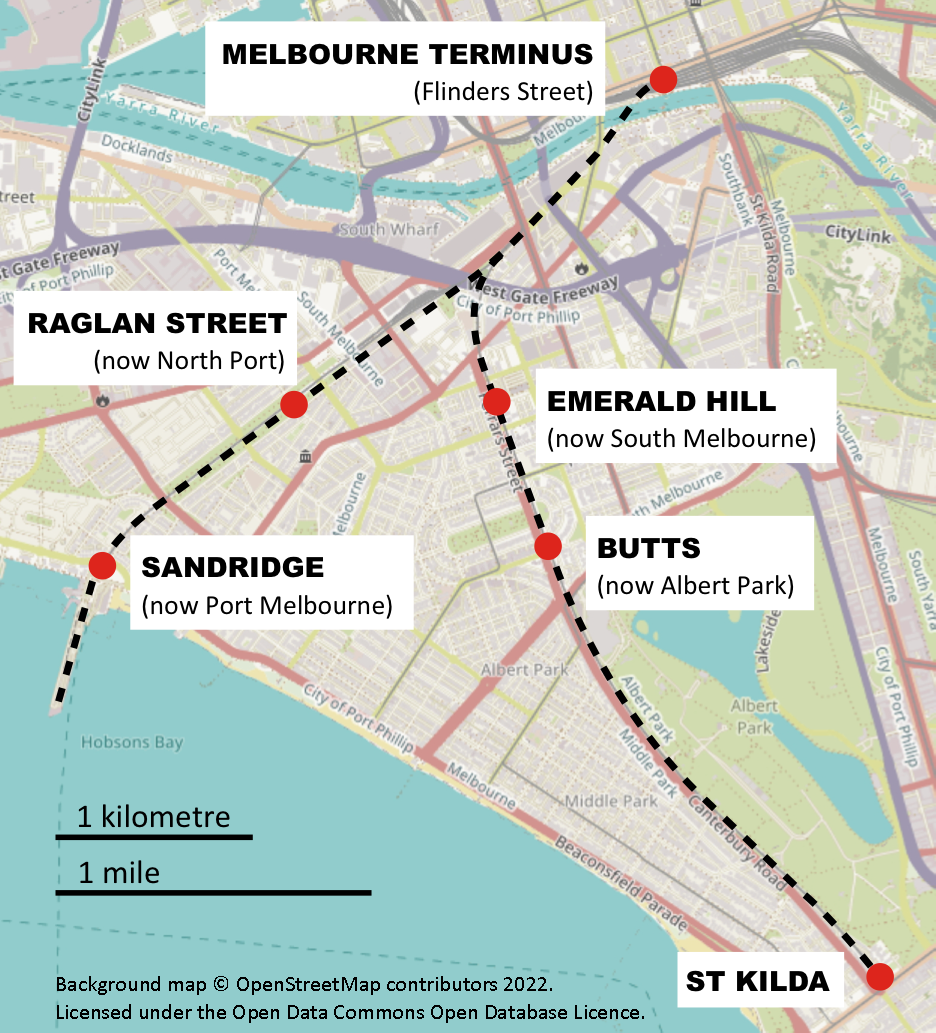
Routes of the company's inaugural lines

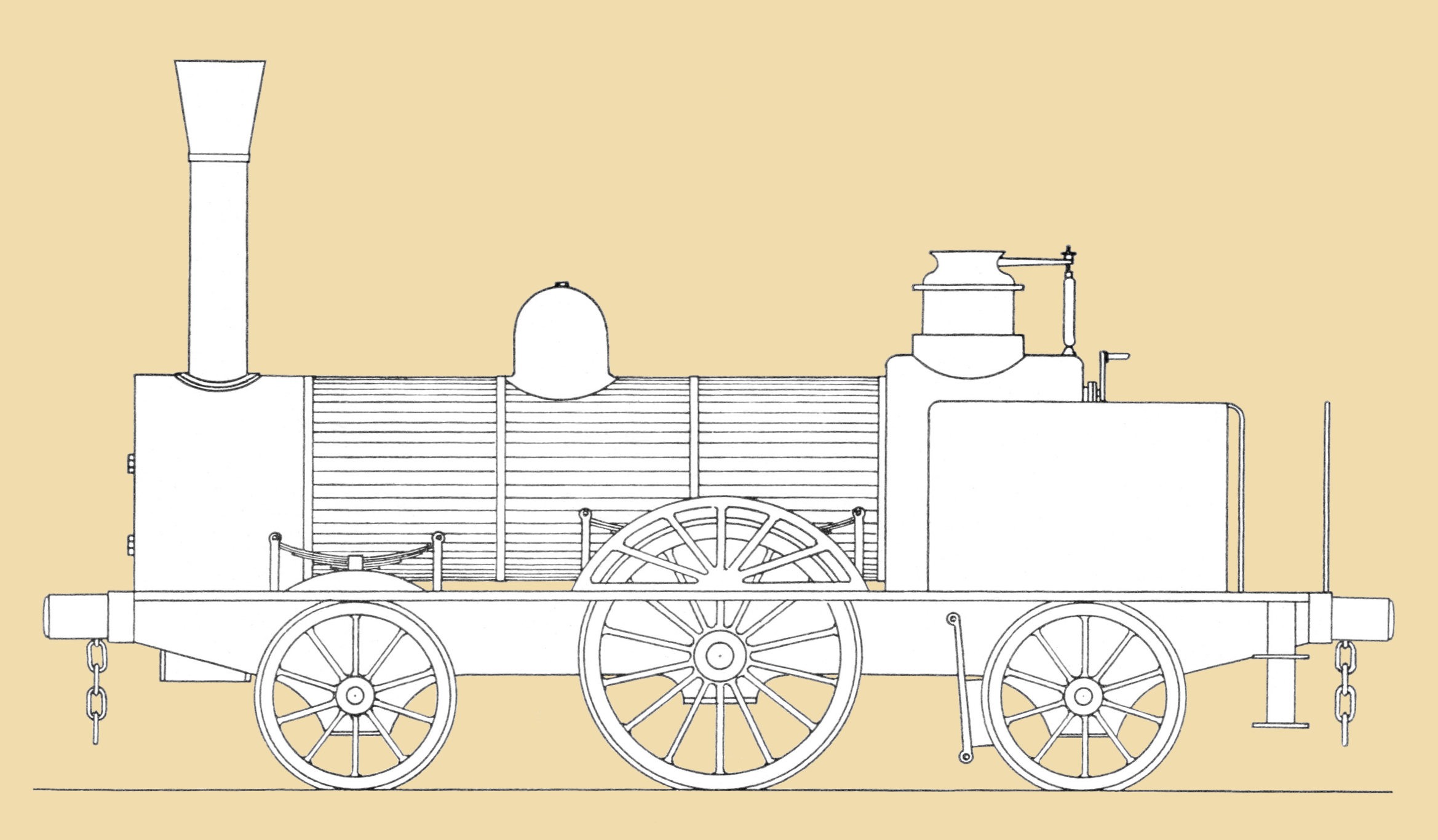
The locomotive that hauled the inaugural train on 12 September 1854 and continued in service for the following three months. It was hurriedly built by Robertson, Martin & Smith in time for the inauguration of the Melbourne and Hobson's Bay railway when production of Robert Stephenson and Company's locomotives in the UK was delayed.

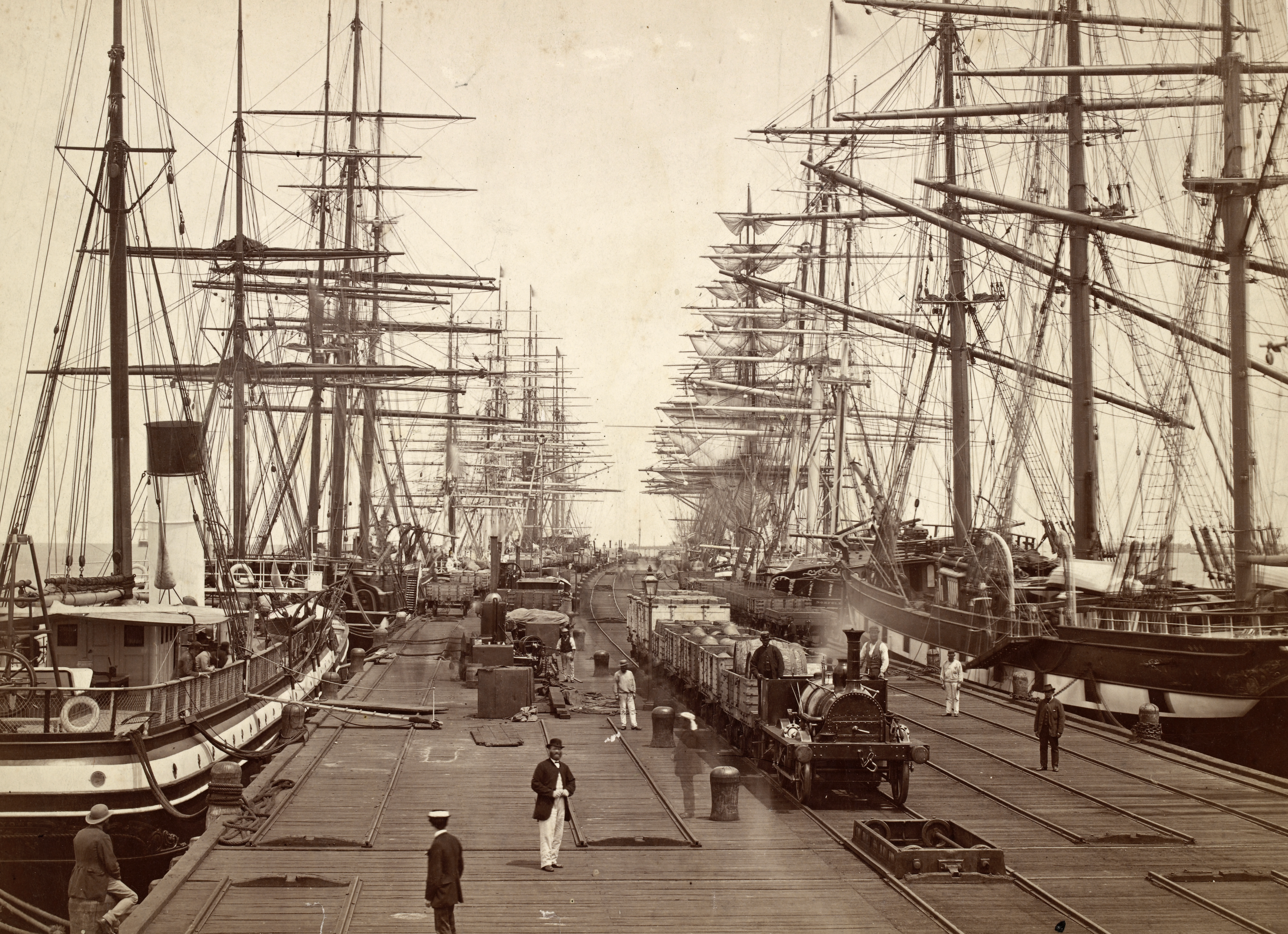
The company's busy pier at Hobson's Bay contributed to profitability until the company was sold in 1878 to the Victorian Government.

The Melbourne and Hobson's Bay Railway Company was a railway company in Victoria, Australia. The company was incorporated on 20 January 1853 to build the line from Melbourne to the port of Sandridge, now Port Melbourne. When the line opened in 1854, it became Australia's first full-scale public railway (in the modern sense, being the first to use steam locomotion and have full-scale infrastructure).

The proposal met considerable opposition, despite the inadequacy and high costs of using horse drays and bullock wagons to carry merchandise from the port to the city. However, the combination of chaotic transport conditions and the extravagant financial prosperity that followed the gold rush led the community to realise the urgent need for railway communication on various routes, of which this one was prominent. The colony's pastoral somnolence was interrupted, never to recur, and a "railway boom" set in.

The line was constructed to 1600 mm (5 ft 3 in) "broad gauge" in keeping with an agreement among Victoria, New South Wales and South Australia to adopt that gauge – subsequently abandoned by the government of New South Wales.

The first engineer for the line was William Snell Chauncy, but he was forced to resign in 1845 due to problems with his work, such as the failure of piles on the railway pier. James Moore C. E., a nephew of Sir William Cubitt (under whom he was engaged on the South Eastern and Great Northern railways in Britain; presumably he had learnt his trade there) was then appointed in March 1854 as Chief Engineer for the Hobson's Bay Railway company. It was said of Moore that he was a man of whose abilities rumour speaks favourably and was responsible for designing the railway line between the city and the pier main deep-water pier on Hobson's Bay at Sandridge.

Work began on laying the railway in March 1853. Trains were ordered from Robert Stephenson and Company of the United Kingdom, but the first train was hauled by a 2-2-2WT locomotive built by local engineering works Robertson, Martin & Smith, because of shipping delays. Australia's first steam locomotive was built in ten weeks and cost £2,700. The line was opened in September 1854 (three years after the discovery of gold at Ballarat) and ran for 4.2 kilometres (2.6 miles) from the Melbourne (or City) Terminus (on the site of modern-day Flinders Street station), crossing the Yarra River on the original Sandridge Bridge to Sandridge (now Port Melbourne).

== Opening ==
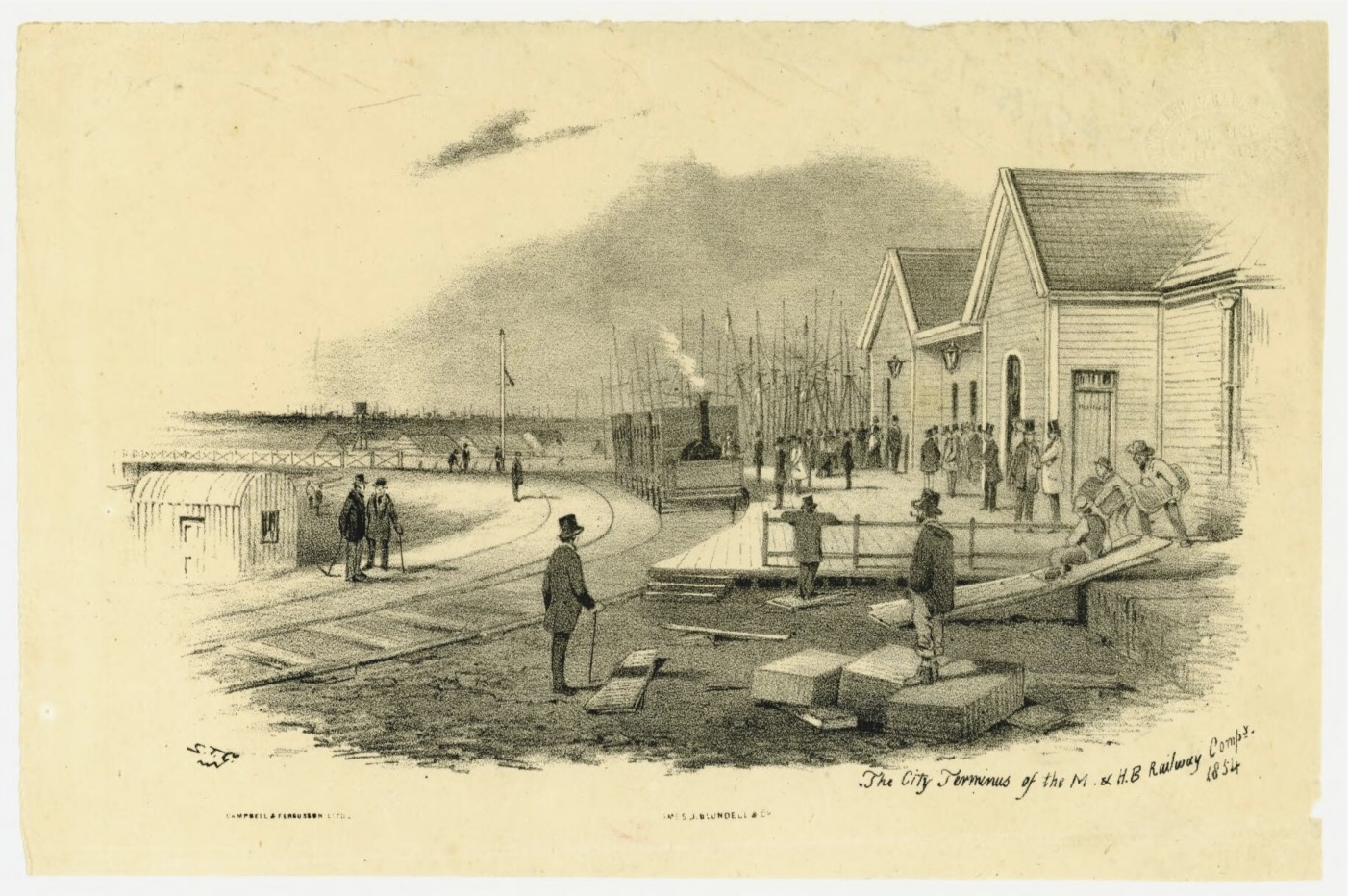
A train arriving at the company's City Terminus at Flinders Street

The opening of the line occurred during the period of the Victorian gold rush – a time when both Melbourne and Victoria undertook massive capital works, each with its own gala opening. The inaugural journey on the Sandridge line was no exception. According to a report in The Argus the following day: "Long before the hour appointed ... a great crowd assembled round the station at the Melbourne terminus, lining the whole of Flinders Street." Lieutenant-Governor Sir Charles Hotham and Lady Hotham were aboard the train – which consisted of two first class carriages and one second class – and were presented with satin copies of the railway's timetable and bylaws.

The trip took ten minutes, none of the later stations along the line having been built. On arriving at Station Pier (onto which the tracks extended), it was hailed with gun-salutes by the warships HMS Electra and HMS Fantome.

== Subsequent history ==
By March 1855, the four engines ordered from the UK were all in service, with trains running every half-hour. They were named Melbourne, Sandridge, Victoria, and Yarra (after the Yarra River over which the line crossed).

Despite high construction costs, the railway was an immediate success, carrying 270,000 passengers and 28,135 tons of goods in its first full year of operations.

In 1857, the company opened a 4.8 km (3.0 mi) line from the present-day Flinders Street station to St Kilda to meet up with the St Kilda to Brighton line being built by the St Kilda and Brighton Railway Company. The name of William Elsdon, the Engineer in Chief, who designed the line, is engraved into the parapet of the bridge at Park Street.

Melbourne and Hobson's Bay Railway Company absorbed the two other remaining suburban railway companies in 1865: the St Kilda and Brighton Railway Company and the Melbourne and Suburban Railway Company. The combined company was incorporated as the Melbourne and Hobson's Bay United Railway Company. In turn it was sold, for £1,320,820, to the Government of Victoria in 1878 to become part of Victorian Railways. Both lines became part of the Melbourne suburban electrified network during the 20th century.

During the company's 13 years' existence, the average annual dividend of 7 1/2 per cent on working operations had resulted, equal to a return of nearly £49 on each £50 share.

Most parts of the two lines were converted to standard gauge light rail in 1987 as tram routes 96 and 109.

== Rolling stock ==
=== Locomotives - Melbourne and Hobson's Bay Railway ===
Class	Wheel arrangement	Fleet number(s)	Manufacturer Serial numbers	Year introduced	Total	Total preserved	Year(s) withdrawn	Comments
—	0-4-0	[Ballast wagon powered by pile driver components]	Robertson, Martin & Smith of Melbourne	1854	1	0	?	Built for the construction of the first railway as ordered locos had not arrived yet
M&HBR 2-2-2WT	2-2-2WT	2-2-2 "Dusty Bob"	Langlands Port Phillip Foundry	1854	1	0	1857	Built for the opening of the first railway as ordered locos had not arrived yet
M&HBR 2-4-0WT	2-4-0WT	Melbourne, Meteor, Rapid, Sandridge, St Kilda, Victoria, Yarra, (3 unnamed)	Robert Stephenson & Co. 954-957, 1080, 1183, 1184, 1268, 1269, 1458	1854	10	0	1858-1865	7 to Melbourne & Hobson's Bay United Railway; 1 to Melbourne & Suburban Railway; 2 to St Kilda & Brighton Railway
M&HBR 0-4-0WT	0-4-0WT	Pier Donkey	Robert Stephenson & Co. 1177	1858	1	0	1865	To Melbourne & Hobson's Bay United Railway

=== Locomotives - Melbourne & Hobson's Bay United Railway ===
Class	Wheel arrangement	Fleet number(s)	Manufacturer Serial numbers	Year introduced	Total	Total preserved	Year(s) withdrawn	Comments
M&HBR; 2-4-0WT	2-4-0WT	1–4, 6–9, 11, 14–16, 19, Melbourne, Meteor, Rapid, Sandridge, St Kilda, Toorak, Victoria (x2), Yarra	Robert Stephenson & Co. 954-957, 1080, 1183, 1184, 1268, 1269, 1458, 1620, 1802, 1803, 1991	1865 (ex various); 1866 (new)	14	0	1872-1878	8 to Victorian Railways as N class; 2 sold for wool pressing; 1 to Cain, Dalrymple & Holtom; 1 to Neil McNeil; 1 to Young & McGuigan; 1 to Miller & James
G&MR 0-6-0WT	0-6-0WT	Hercules	R&W Hawthorn; 928	1865 (ex MRC)	1	0	1869	To Overend & Robb
M&HBR 0-4-0WT	0-4-0WT	5, 24, Pier Donkey (x2)	Robert Stephenson & Co. 1177, 2220	1865 (ex M&HBR); 1875 (new)	2	0	1878	To Victorian Railways
M&SR 2-4-0T	2-4-0T	17, 18, Hawthorn, Richmond	George England & Co. 160, 161	1865 (ex MRC)	2	0	1872-1877	1 to Patrick Higgins; 1 to Cain, Dalrymple & Holtom
M&SR 2-4-0WT	2-4-0WT	10, Kew	Robert Stephenson & Co. 1377	1865 (ex MRC)	1	0	1882	To Public Works Dept.
MRC 2-4-0WT	2-4-0WT	12 - 13, Prahran, Windsor	Robert Stephenson & Co. 1459, 1460	1865 (ex MRC)	2	0	1878-1882	1 to Public Works Dept.; 1 to Victorian Railways as N class
M&HBUR 4-4-0WT	4-4-0WT	20 - 23, 25 - 26	Robert Stephenson & Co. 1995, 2123, 2130, 2214, 2328, 2329	1871	6	0	1878	All to Victorian Railways as C class

Companies
First	Melbourne and Hobson's Bay Railway Company; 20 January 1853 – 30 June 1865	Succeeded by Melbourne and Hobson's Bay United Railway Company
Preceded by Melbourne and Hobson's Bay Railway Company 30 June 1865	Melbourne and Hobson's Bay United Railway Company; 30 June 1865 – 1 July 1878	Succeeded by Victorian Railways
Preceded by Melbourne Railway Company 30 June 1865	Melbourne and Hobson's Bay United Railway Company; 30 June 1865 – 1 July 1878	Succeeded by Victorian Railways
Preceded by St Kilda and Brighton Railway Company 1 September 1865	Melbourne and Hobson's Bay United Railway Company; 30 June 1865 – 1 July 1878	Succeeded by Victorian Railways
