= Brighton Beach railway station =

Heritage-listed railway station in Melbourne, Victoria, Australia

Brighton Beach
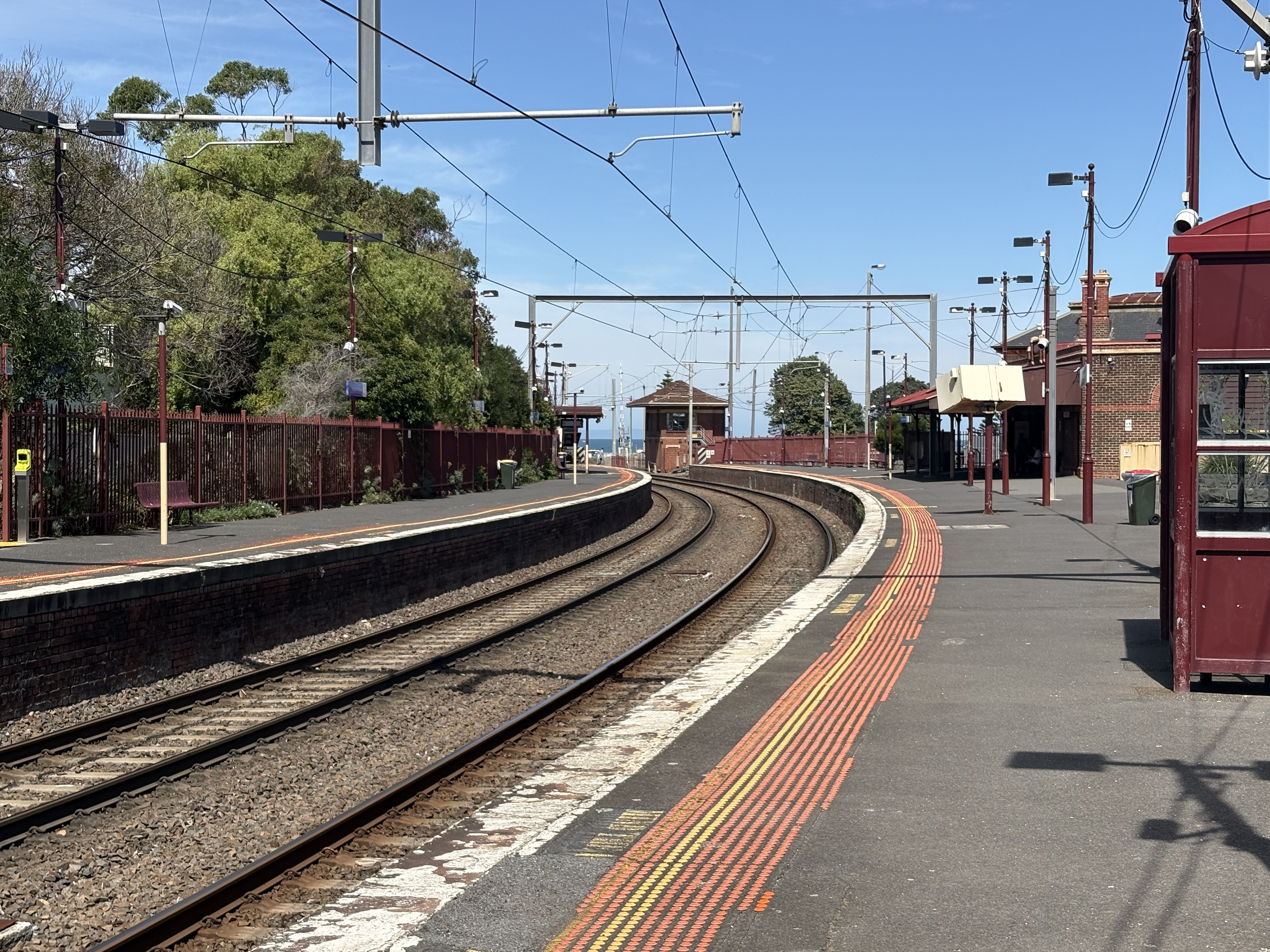
- Southbound view from Platform 2, March 2026

General information
- Location: South Road, Brighton, Victoria 3186; City of Bayside; Australia
- Coordinates: 37°55′35″S 144°59′21″E
- System: PTV commuter rail station
- Owner: VicTrack
- Operator: Metro Trains
- Line: Sandringham
- Distance: 15.97 kilometres from Southern Cross
- Platforms: 3 (1 island, 1 side, 1 not in use)
- Tracks: 5
- Connections: Bus

Construction
- Structure type: Ground
- Parking: 187
- Cycle facilities: Yes
- Accessible: Yes—step free access

Other information
- Status: Operational, premium station
- Station code: BBH
- Fare zone: Myki zone 1/2
- Website: Public Transport Victoria

History
- Opened: 21 December 1861; 164 years ago
- Electrified: May 1919 (1500 V DC overhead)
- Former names: Beach (1861–1867)

Passengers
- 2005–2006: 355,909
- 2006–2007: 376,340 ▲5.74%
- 2007–2008: 386,069 ▲2.58%
- 2008–2009: 426,686 ▲10.52%
- 2009–2010: 455,663 ▲6.79%
- 2010–2011: 456,527 ▲0.18%
- 2011–2012: 455,036 ▼0.32%
- 2012–2013: Not measured
- 2013–2014: 500,927 ▲10.08%
- 2014–2015: 461,449 ▼7.88%
- 2015–2016: 497,687 ▲7.85%
- 2016–2017: 469,888 ▼5.58%
- 2017–2018: 486,772 ▲3.59%
- 2018–2019: 447,579 ▼8.05%
- 2019–2020: 345,550 ▼22.79%
- 2020–2021: 140,150 ▼59.44%
- 2021–2022: 186,400 ▲33%
- 2022–2023: 386,650 ▲107.43%
- 2023–2024: 393,350 ▲1.73%
- 2024–2025: 332,650 ▼15.43%

Services
Preceding station	Metro Trains	Following station
Middle Brighton towards Laverton, Werribee or Williamstown via Flinders Street	Sandringham line	Hampton towards Sandringham
- Building details

General information
- Architectural style: Victorian Free Classical
- Year built: 1889

Technical details
- Material: Bluestone; red bricks

Design and construction
- Architect: George Sims
- Main contractor: Donald Swanson
- A preserved Tait set at the station in 2024

Victorian Heritage Register
- Official name: Brighton Beach Railway Station
- Type: Registered place
- Designated: 31 August 1995
- Reference no.: H1077
- Heritage overlay no.: HO348
- Category: Transport - Rail
Track layout
Location

The Brighton Beach station is a railway station operated by Metro Trains Melbourne on the Sandringham line, which is part of the Melbourne rail network. It serves the south-eastern Melbourne suburb of Brighton, opened on 21 December 1861 as Beach, and renamed Brighton Beach on 1 January 1867. Brighton Beach is a ground level premium station, featuring three platforms, an island platform with two faces, a curved face on platform 2 and a straight face on platform 1 and one side platform with a curved face, however, platform one is not in use while platforms 2 and 3 are in use. The Brighton Bathing Boxes and Brighton Beach Oval are located a short walk from the station. The station is fully accessible.

The station consists of three platforms, a terminating platform currently used as a siding, and two curved platforms, built in 1887 when the line was extended to Sandringham, accessed through the station building. The single station building, constructed in 1889, replaced a timber building provided when the station was first opened. The station building was added to the Victorian Heritage Register on 31 August 1995 in recognition of its architectural, historic, and social significance, noted for its unusual shape and proximity to the coastline. The railway station complex was also added to a non-statutory list by the Victorian branch of the National Trust.

The station is serviced by the Sandringham line, part of the Melbourne railway network. The station connects to the routes 600, 603 and 923 bus services. The journey to Southern Cross railway station is approximately 16 kilometres (9.9 mi).

== Description ==
Brighton Beach station is located in Brighton, a suburb of Melbourne, Victoria. The station is located close to the beach, hence its name. Directly to the south of the station is a level crossing with South Road. The station is owned by VicTrack, a state government agency, and the station is operated by Metro Trains. The adjacent stations are Middle Brighton up towards Flinders Street and Hampton down towards Sandringham.

The station consists of three platforms: an island with a terminating platform used as a siding, and a curved platform, and a curved side platform, connected by a footbridge and the main station building. The curved platforms were built in 1887, when the line was extended to Sandringham. A stabling yard with two tracks is located adjacent to Platform 1. The yard was originally used for stabling, but was converted to a siding for the VICERS project. In 2010, the stabling facilities were reinstated. Standard in Melbourne, the platform has an asphalt surface with concrete on the edges. The station is fully accessible, and is a premium station, meaning it is staffed from first train to last.

The station building, located between platforms one and two, was designed by George Sims and built by contractor Donald Swanson in 1889, replacing a timber structure erected when the station was first opened as a terminus. Similar buildings were constructed later at North Brighton and Prahran. The citation on the Victorian Heritage Register noted its unusual shape, wedged between two platforms; and its uniqueness in railway architecture, noting architectural features including "the pedimented entrance porch, the patterned brickwork, the tiled frieze below the eaves cornice, the bluestone columns at the barriers, the tessellated paving to the entrance lobby, the round brick arches and the additional red brick banding at the entry".

== History ==
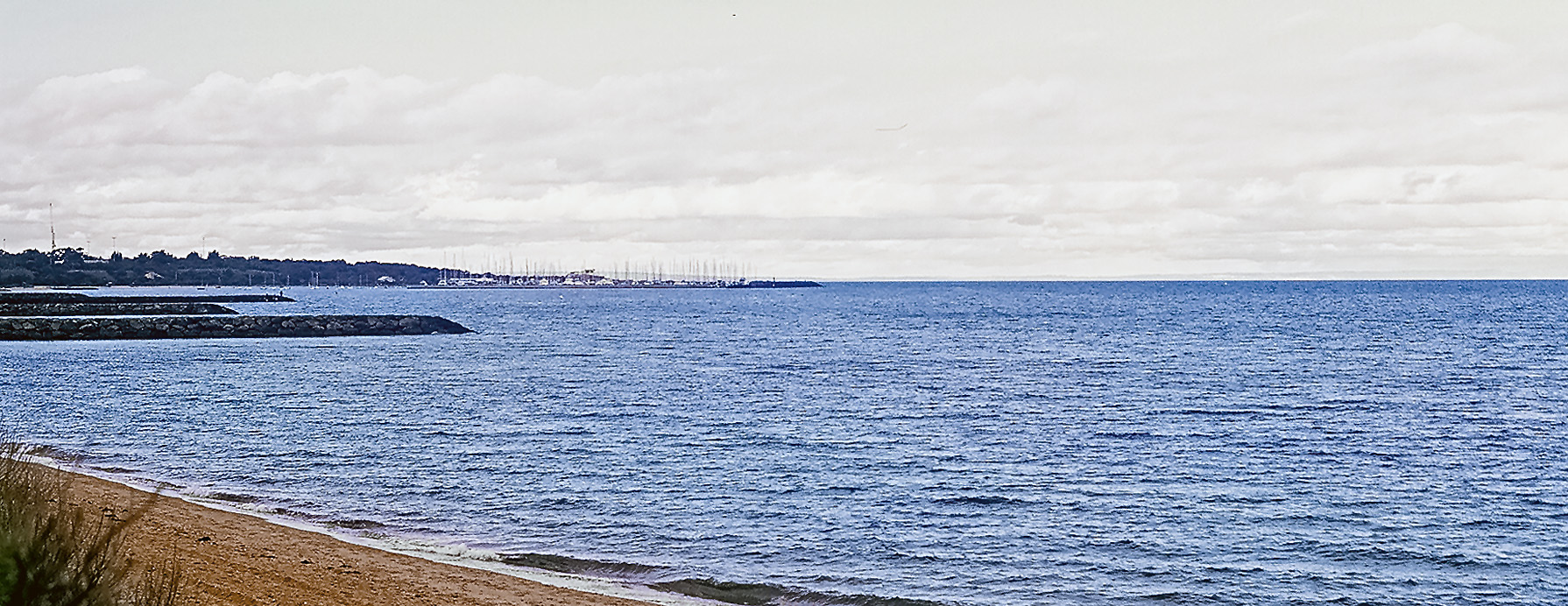
Brighton beach nearby which the station is named after

Brighton Beach station opened on 21 December 1861, when the railway line from North Brighton was extended, with a timber station building and a single terminating platform. It was named after the nearby Brighton Beach, a popular destination at the time. It remained a terminus until 2 September 1887, when the line was extended to Sandringham, with two additional curved platforms added. In 1889, the current station building was constructed, and in 1919, the line to Sandringham was electrified using 1500 V DC overhead wires. In 1926, a signal box was constructed, located between the down end of Platform 2 and the South Road level crossing.

Since 1926, the station has stayed largely the same, with only minor changes taking place. In 1968, boom barriers replaced interlocked gates at the South Road level crossing, located at the down end of the station.

On 20 November 1995, Brighton Beach was upgraded to a premium station.

Following a 2019 commitment by the Federal Government, the station was due to receive an upgraded commuter car park. However, this was scrapped by the same government in 2021.

=== New Street gates ===
Further down the line from the station, the next staffed location before Hampton Station was the New Street level crossing, which was provided with hand-worked swinging gates. Also listed on the Victorian Heritage Register, these were the last manually-operated railway gates in Victoria. In 2007, the swing gates were hit by a train, causing significant damage. In 2010, the level crossing was closed by the Brumby government, with plans to re-open the level crossing with boom barriers. The project, which cost $4.4 million, included the replacement of the hand-operated gates with boom barriers, installation of flashing lights and bells, and a wider pedestrian crossing. It was opened in 2013 by Louise Asher, the Member for Brighton.

== Platforms and services ==
Brighton Beach consists of an island platform with two faces and a side platform, being the only station on the Sandringham line to have three platforms. There is a large brick building on Platforms 1 and 2 (island platform), housing an enclosed waiting area, ticket facilities and toilets. There are also ticket facilities at the up (Flinders Street) end of the island platform, for customers accessing Brighton Beach via the footbridge. Platform 3 has a smaller brick building, with a waiting area, ticket facilities and a payphone. Being a Premium Station, Brighton Beach is staffed from first to last train each day.

In 2011, a fence was erected on Platform 2 to direct passengers to the front half of the train and discourage them from boarding the rear half, because of the large gap between the train and the platform due to the station being built on a sharp curve. Additionally, station staff are required to be in attendance on Platform 2 for all train services, to ensure passengers have boarded safely, as there have been cases of passengers falling into the gap between the train and the platform.

The station is served by Sandringham line trains. Following the opening of the Metro Tunnel, northbound trains began operating through to Laverton, Werribee and Williamstown, having previously terminated at Flinders Street.

Brighton Beach platform arrangement
Platform	Line	Destination	Via	Service Type	Notes	Source
1	No scheduled services					
2	Sandringham line	Laverton, Werribee or Williamstown	Flinders Street	All stations	Services to Laverton and Williamstown only operate on weekdays.	
3	Sandringham line	Sandringham		All stations		

== Transport links ==
Kinetic Melbourne operates three bus routes via Brighton Beach station, under contract to Public Transport Victoria:

- 600 : Westfield Southland – St Kilda station
- 603 : to Burnley station
- 923 : Westfield Southland – St Kilda station

Formerly, Brighton Beach was served by a tram line from St Kilda, with the extension from Middle Brighton to Brighton Beach opening in December 1906. After a lack of maintenance causing severe issues with the line, a material and finance shortage during World War II, and finally a decrease in patronage due to bus and car competition, the line was closed between Brighton Beach and Middle Brighton in January 1956, and closed fully in February 1959, despite protests from the community.

== See also ==
- Architecture of Melbourne
- Ebrington (Brighton)
- List of railway stations in Melbourne
- List of places on the Victorian Heritage Register in the City of Bayside
