= Beach hut =

Type of hut

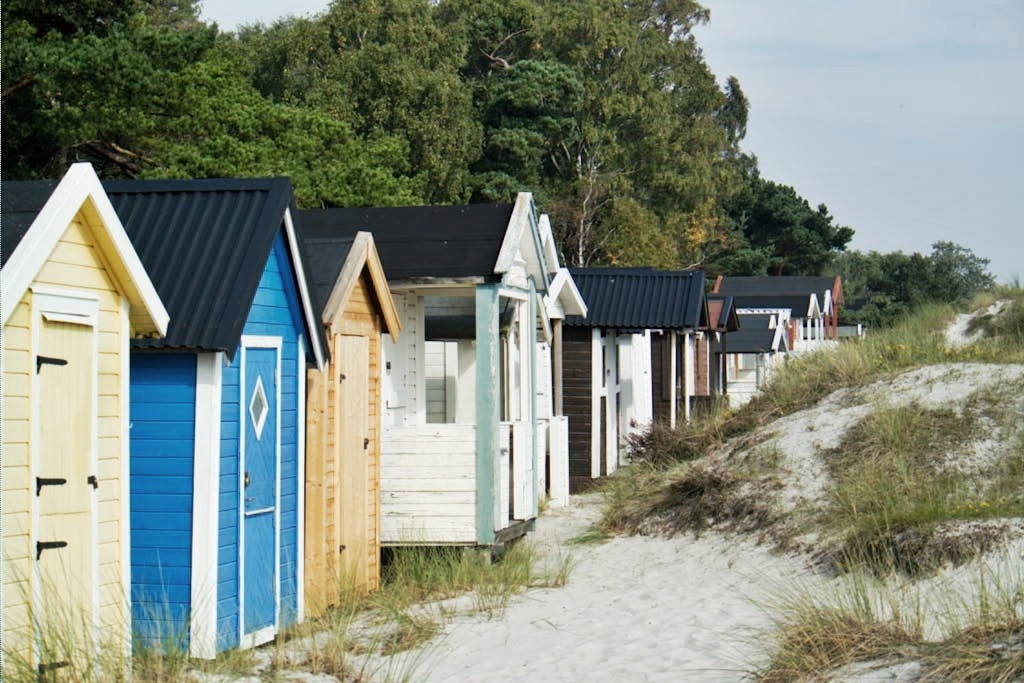
Beach huts by the Baltic Sea in Höllviken, Sweden.

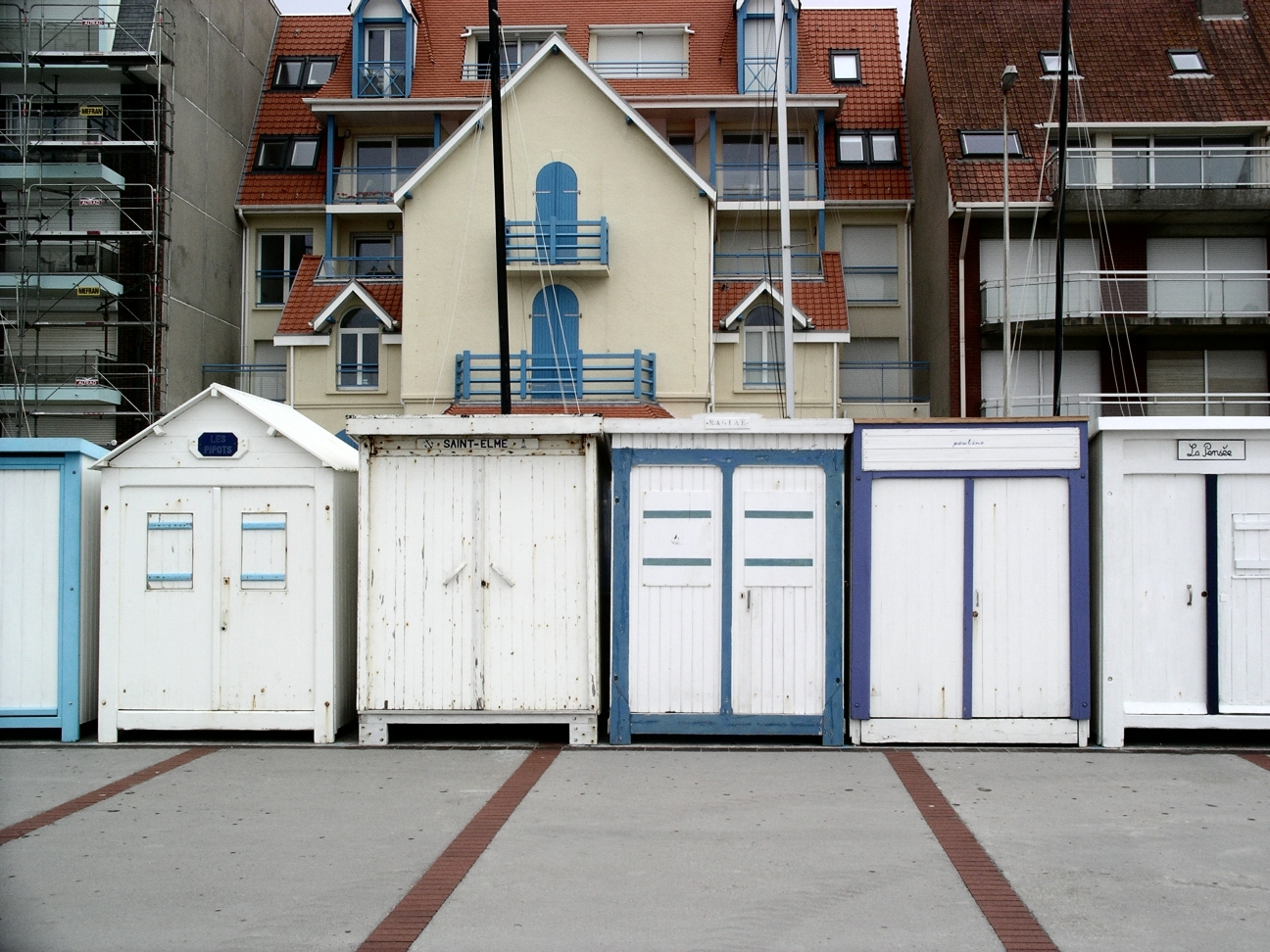
Beach huts or beach cabines in front of modern housing development, Wimereux, France

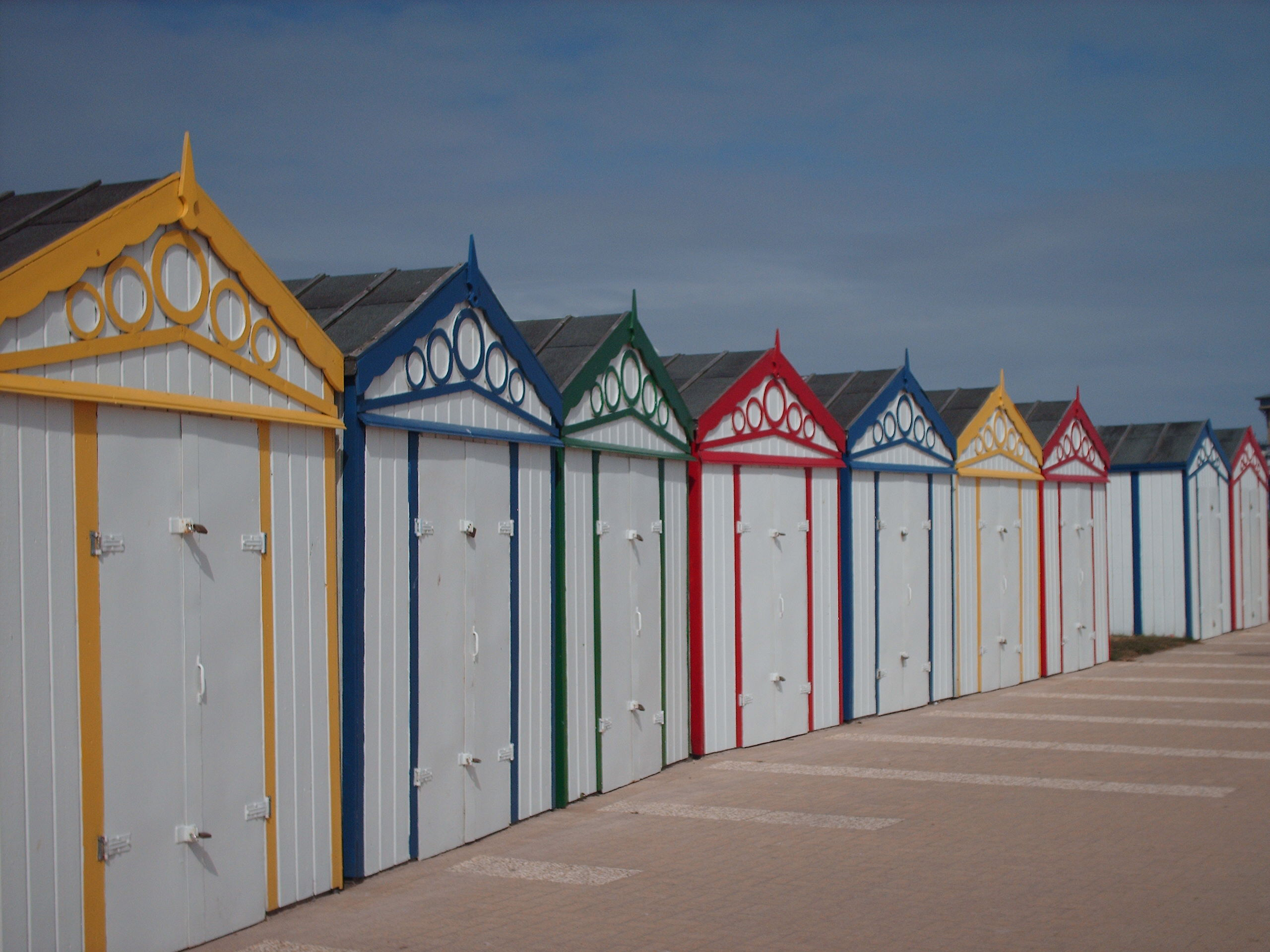
Beach huts at Great Yarmouth, Norfolk

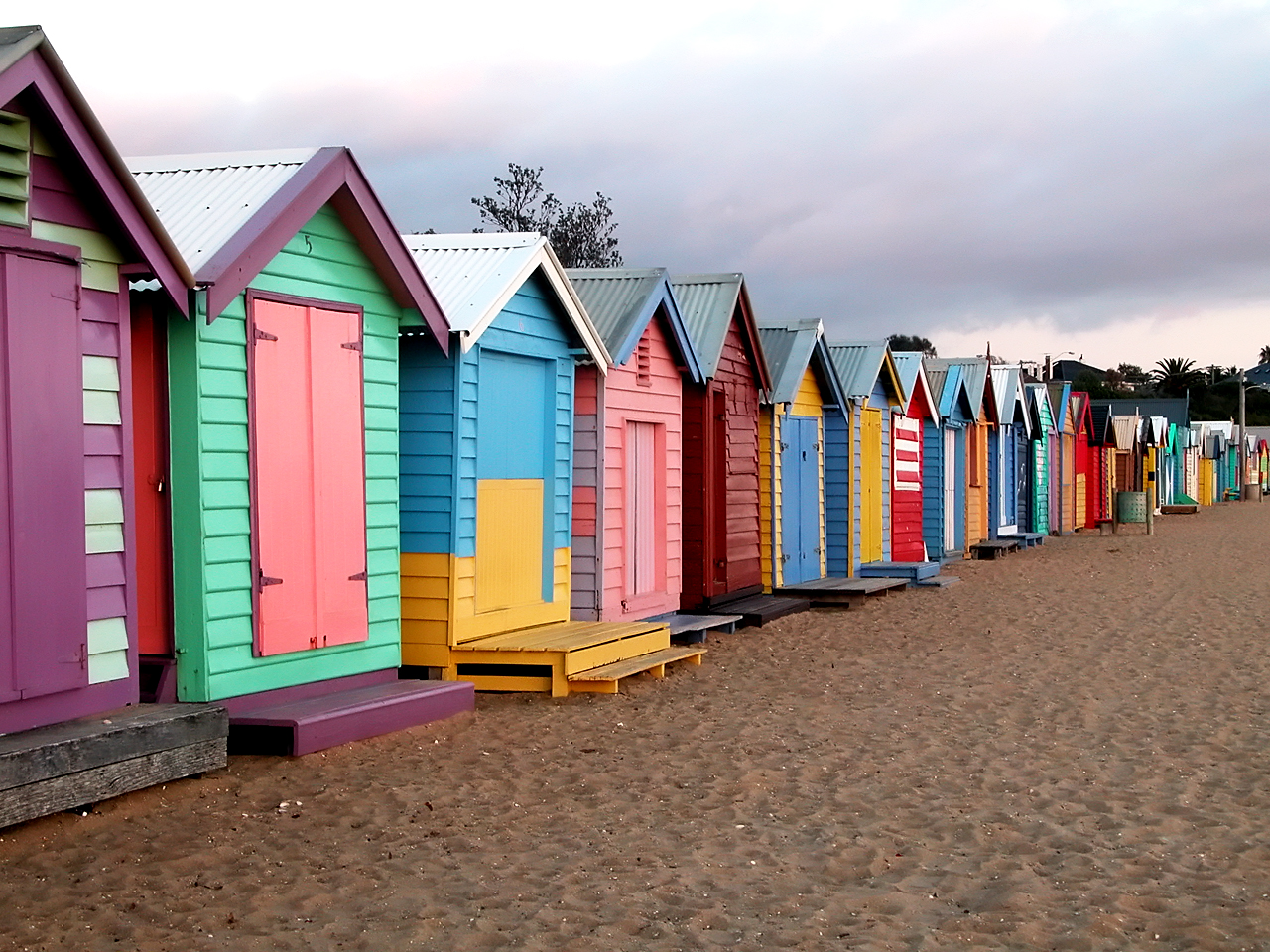
Brighton Bathing Boxes on Dendy Street Beach, in Brighton, Victoria

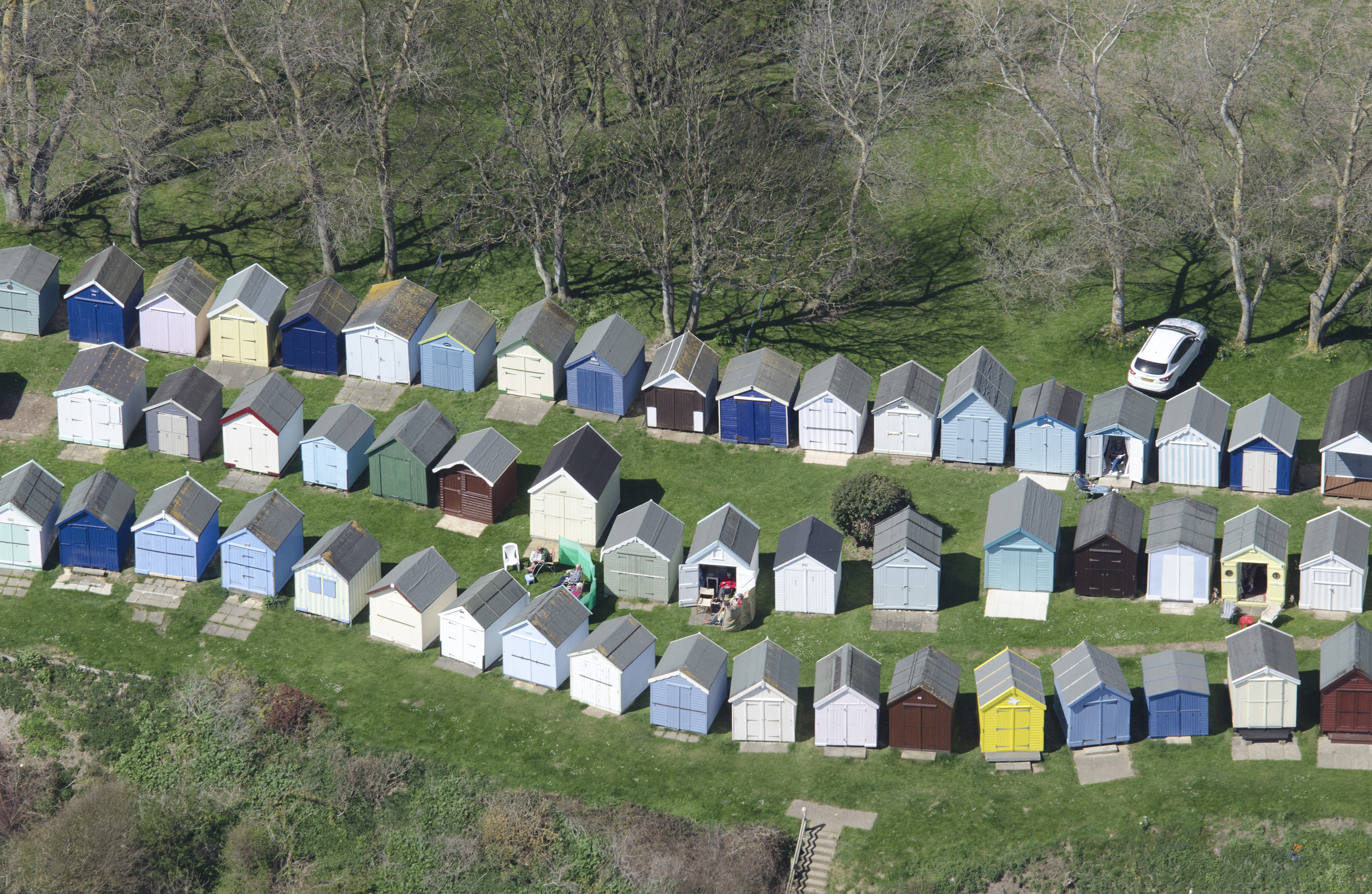
Beach Huts at Brackenbury Cliffs, Felixstowe

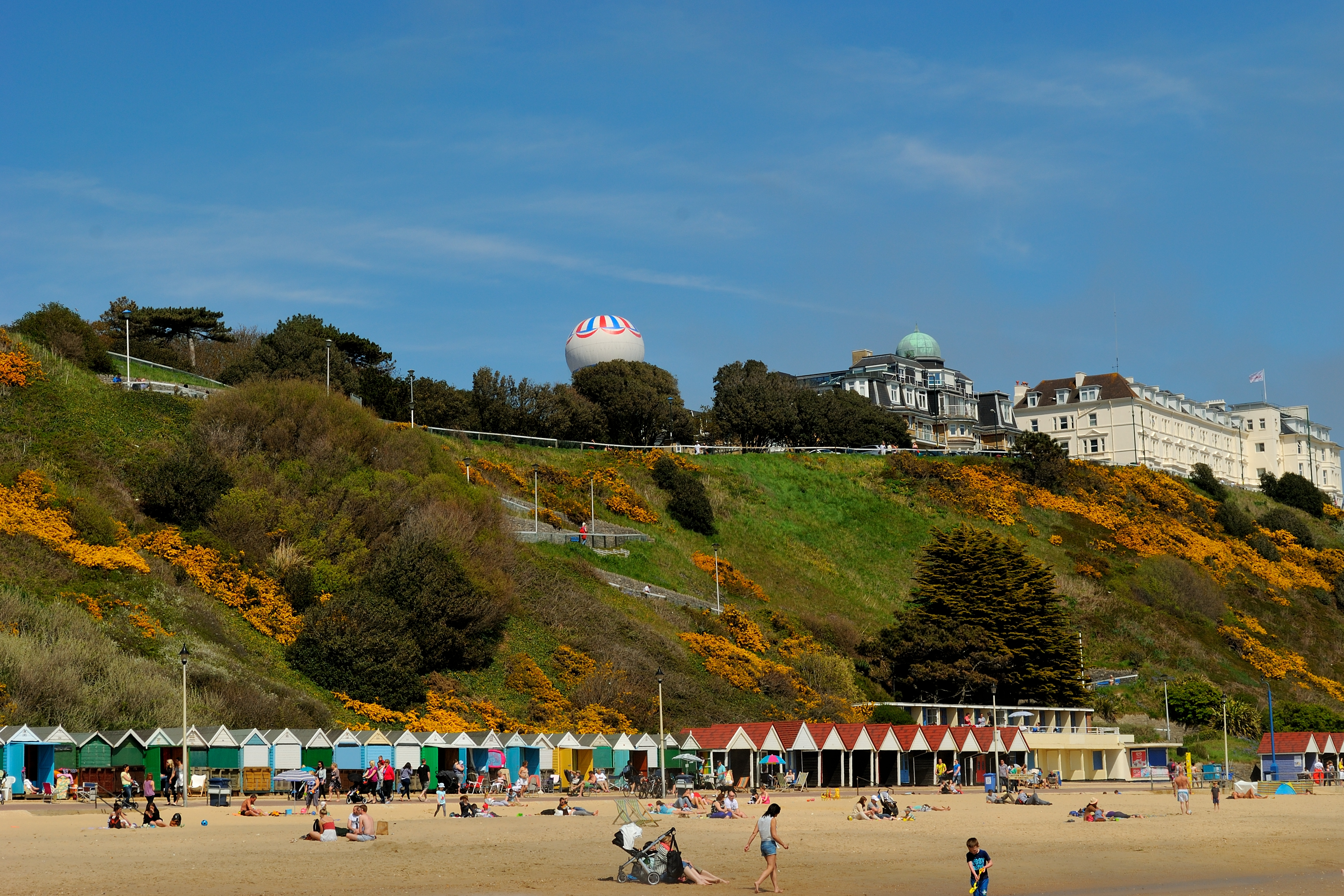
Beach Huts at Bournemouth Beach

A beach hut (also known as a beach cabin, beach cabana (American English), beach box or bathing box) is a small, usually wooden and often brightly coloured, box above the high tide mark on popular bathing beaches. They are generally used as a shelter from the sun or wind, changing into and out of swimming attire and for the safe storing of some personal belongings. Some beach huts incorporate simple facilities for preparing food and hot drinks by either bottled gas or occasionally mains electricity.

== Locations ==
At many seaside resorts, beach huts are arranged in one or more ranks along the top of the beach. Depending upon the location, beach huts may be owned privately or may be owned by the local council or similar administrative body. On popular beaches, privately owned beach huts can command substantial prices due to their convenient location, out of all proportion to their size and amenity. A pre-war wooden beach chalet at West Bexington, Dorset sold at auction for £216,000 in 2006, and a beach hut on Mudeford Spit sold for £170,000 in 2012, where prices have risen above £270,000 by 2017. However these were exceptional as in both cases overnight stays were possible. Prices in 2009 for typical huts around the UK started from £6,000 in Walton on the Naze and typically up to £35,000. In January 2016, a beach hut was sold in Brighton, Victoria, Australia for a record $285,000.

An April 2021 report provided an update on this category: "the average asking price for a beach hut in Britain has shot up from £25,578 to £36,034" in a single 12-month period.

Today there are believed to be around 20,000 beach huts in the U.K. Locations where beach huts can be seen include Lowestoft, Southwold, Walton-on-the-Naze, Frinton-on-Sea, Abersoch, Langland Bay, Rotherslade, Rustington, St Helens, Isle of Wight, Tankerton Slopes and Mersea Island. Locations in other countries include Wimereux, France, spectacular colorful picturesque in Cape Town, South Africa, Nesodden, Norway and Brighton and elsewhere around Port Phillip, Australia.

Holhuashi are small Maldivian resting places usually found only in the Maldives. These small beach huts can be found near beaches or harbours.

== History ==
The noted bathing boxes at Brighton in Australia are known to have existed as far back as 1862. The bathing boxes are thought to have been constructed and used largely as a response to the Victorian morality of the age, and are known to have existed not only in Australia but also on the beaches of England, France and Italy and Cape Town at around the same time.

They had evolved from the wheeled bathing machines used by Victorians to preserve their modesty. George III gave royal approval to the new fashion when he took a medicinal bath at Weymouth to the musical accompaniment of 'God Save the King', while Queen Victoria installed one at Osborne House on the Isle of Wight in the 1840s.

Felixstowe in Suffolk is believed to have had beach huts from at least 1891.

In the early 20th century, beach huts were regarded as "holiday homes for the toiling classes", but in the 1930s their image revived, George V and Queen Mary spent the day at a beach hut in Sussex, and other owners have included the Spencer family and Laurence Olivier. During World War II all UK beaches were closed, the reopening in the late 1940s and 1950s led to resurgence of the British beach holiday and the heyday of the Beach Hut.

While many beach huts were former fishermen's huts, boat-sheds or converted bathing machines, some of the earliest purpose built beach huts in the UK were erected at Bournemouth, either side of Bournemouth Pier in 1909. Designed by F. P. Dolamore, Bournemouth's Borough Engineer, they were offered for hire for £12 10s per year. Before World War I, 160 huts styled like bungalows were initially built. Today, Bournemouth features around 520 Council-owned and 1200 privately owned huts. Their style varies from traditional, wooden, shed-like constructions to ultra-modern concrete terrace huts such as the 1950s Overstrand beach huts at Boscombe. These redesigned by Wayne and Gerardine Hemingway, founders of the Red or Dead label, as Beach Pods for the Surf Reef opened in Autumn 2009.

== Notable huts ==
The Queen's beach hut in Norfolk, England, had been owned by the Royal Family for 70 years and was known to be much loved by the Queen before its destruction in a fire in 2003.

Artist Tracey Emin sold her Whitstable beach hut to collector Charles Saatchi for £75,000. This hut was also destroyed by fire when the warehouse where it was stored burnt down.

In April 2011, Bournemouth Council obtained planning permission to site a beach hut "chapel" on the sand to host wedding and civil partnership ceremonies. The "super beach hut" is located on Bournemouth's beach under the West Cliff lift.

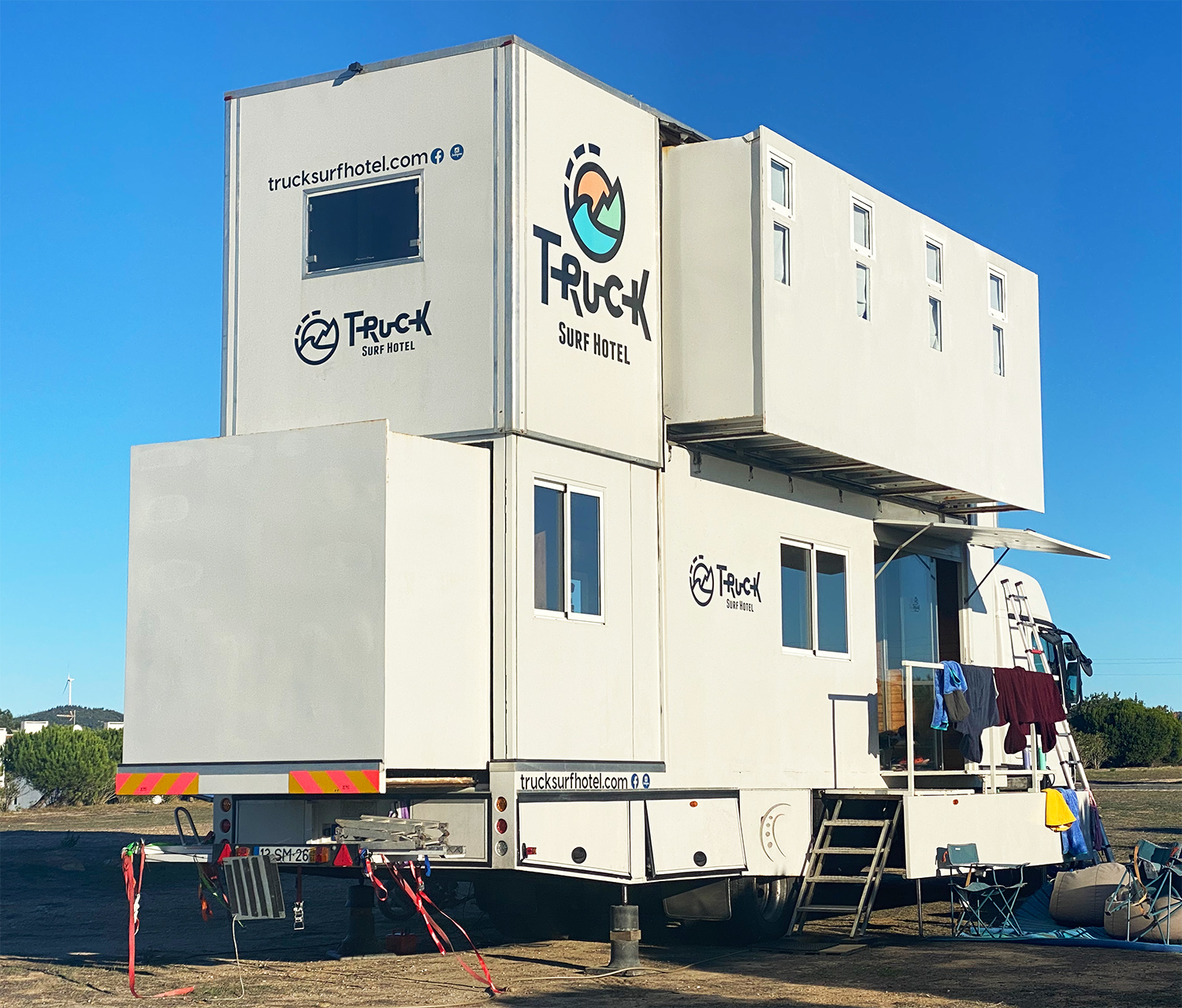
The Truck Surf Hotel, a five-room surf hotel that moves from beach to beach.

The Truck Surf Hotel is a five-room bed-and-breakfast built onto a truck, which serves the surfing community by moving from beach to beach along the coasts of Portugal and Morocco in a weekly cycle.

== See also ==
- Tiny house movement
- Shepherd's hut
- Vardo (Romani wagon)
- Shotgun house
- Bach (New Zealand)
- Bathing machine
- Boatshed
- Cabana
- Ine-ura
