= Overlanding =

Travel to remote places focused on the journey more than destination

Overlanding or four-wheel drive (4WD) touring is self-reliant overland (that is travelling or done by land) travel to remote destinations where the journey is the principal goal. Typically, but not exclusively, it is accomplished with mechanized off-road capable transport (from bicycles to trucks) where the principal form of lodging is camping, often lasting for extended lengths of time (months to years) and spanning international boundaries.

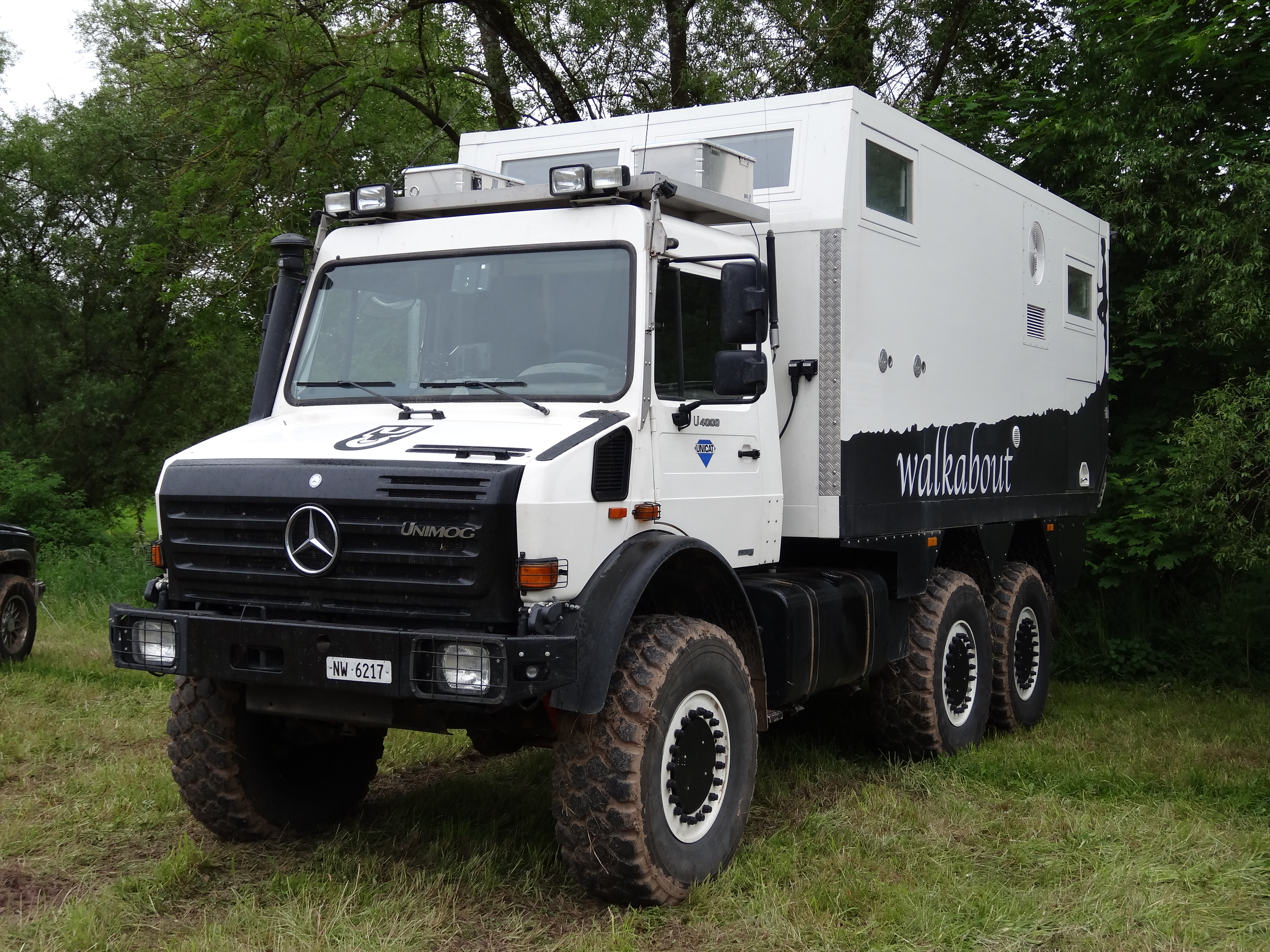
Unimog based 6x6 overlanding capable RV

== History ==
Historically, "overlanding" is an Australian term to denote the droving of livestock over very long distances to open up new country or to take livestock to market far from grazing grounds. Between 1906 and 1910, Alfred Canning opened up the Canning Stock Route. In Australia, overlanding was inspired to a large degree by Len Beadell who, in the 1940s and 1950s, constructed many of the roads that opened up the Australian Outback to colonizers. Those roads are still used today by Australian overlanders and still hold the names Len gave them; the Gunbarrel Highway, the Connie Sue Highway (named after his daughter), and the Anne Beadell Highway (named after his wife).

Overlanding in its most modern form with the use of mechanized transport began in the middle of the last century with the advent of commercially available four-wheel-drive trucks (Mercedes-Benz G-Class's, Toyota Land Cruisers, Unimog, Jeeps and Land Rovers). Nonetheless, there were a few earlier pioneers travelling in remarkably unsophisticated vehicles.

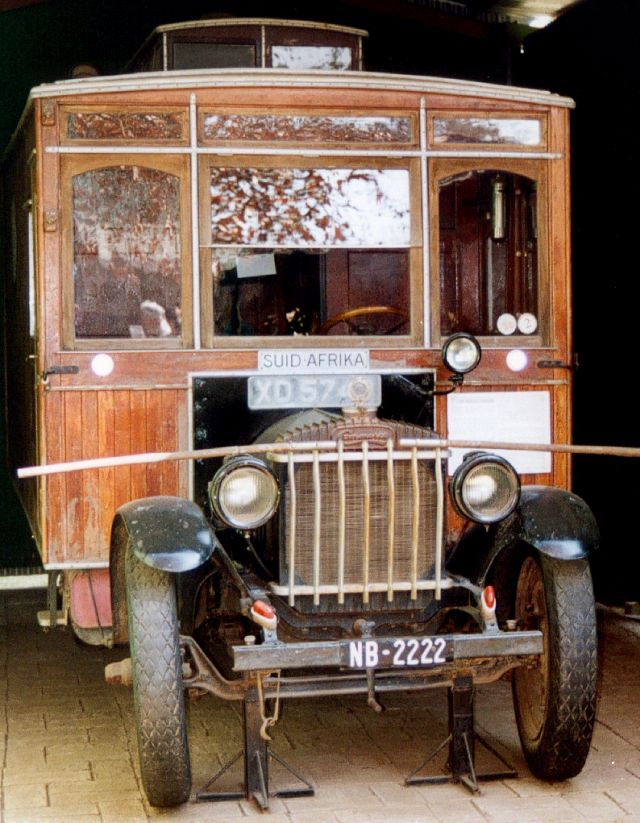
The Weston motorcaravan at Winterton Museum

In the early 1920s, John Weston and family travelled from Britain to Greece and back in a converted US built Commerce one ton truck with a Continental N engine. At the time, the Weston family was based in Europe but returned to South Africa, their homeland, in 1924, taking the vehicle with them. In 1931, the family set out in the same truck from the south-western tip of Africa and drove to Cairo and on to Britain. Not only is this story well-documented but remarkably the vehicle is still extant. In 1975, following renovation, it featured in the International Veteran and Vintage Car Rally from Durban to Cape Town and was then donated to the Winterton Museum, KwaZulu Natal, South Africa, where it can be seen today.

In 1949, with the Land Rover brand less than a year old, Colonel Leblanc drove his brand new 80-inch Series I Land Rover from the United Kingdom to Abyssinia.

There followed many more private journeys, with many groups setting out from Europe for remote African destinations. To aid in these endeavors the Automobile Association of South Africa published a guide titled Trans-African Highways, A Route Book of the Main Trunk Roads in Africa. The first edition appeared in 1949 and included sections on choice of vehicle, choice of starting time, petrol supplies, water, provisions, equipment, rules of the road, government officials and rest houses. The serious tone of this book gives some clue as to the magnitude of such a trip, and it was from these beginnings that overlanding developed in Europe and Africa. Notable early examples include Barbara Toy's solo overland journeys in a Land Rover, including one in 1951-2 from Tangier to Baghdad, and the 1955-6 Oxford and Cambridge Far Eastern Expedition, which travelled overland from London to Singapore, also in Land Rovers.

One of the most well documented overland journeys was by Horatio Nelson Jackson in 1903. In 1954, Helen and Frank Schreider drove and sailed the length of the Americas from Circle, Alaska on the Arctic Circle to Ushuaia, Tierra del Fuego in a sea-going ex-army jeep.

In 2015, the Overlanding Association was created to help, support and inform overlanders. To date they have lobbied the European commission and the FIA to improve the rights of Carnet users in Europe.

== Modern overlanding ==
Overlanding has increased in recent history, and is getting ever more popular in large part influenced by the Camel Trophy event run from 1980 to 2000 with routes crossing some intensely difficult terrain. It is now quite common for groups of overlanders to organize meetings, and an annual meeting is held every Christmas at Ushuaia. Through the use of the Internet it is much easier to find the information required for extended overland trips in foreign lands and there are several internet forums where travelers can exchange information and tips as well as coordinate planning. While some commercially built overland capable vehicles are produced, many overlanders consider the preparation of their vehicle a paramount part of the experience. The U.S., South Africa and Australia have significant industries based on making accessories for overland travel.

=== Commercial overlanding ===
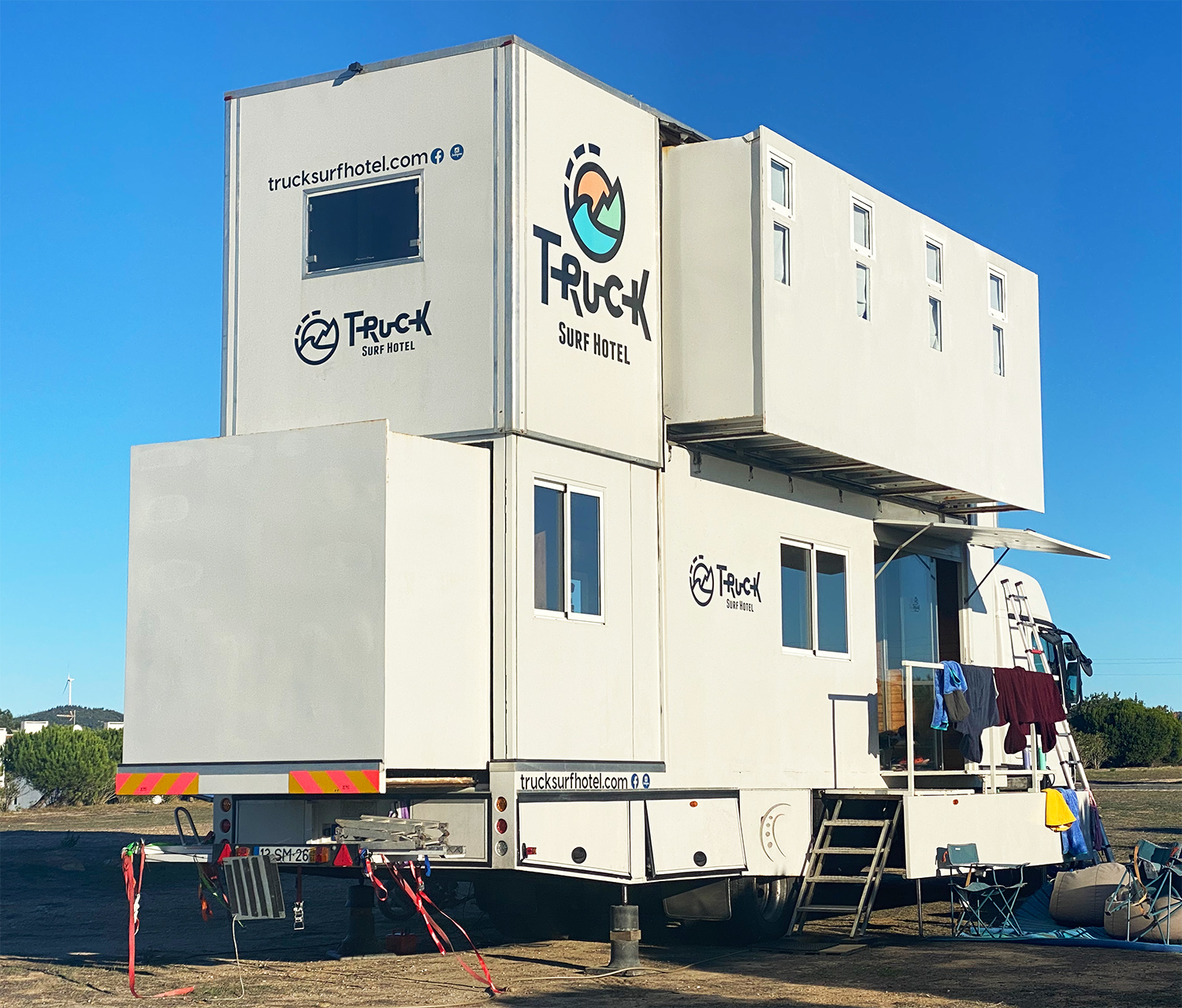
The Truck Surf Hotel, a two-story, five-room mobile hotel built on a Mercedes Actros truck chassis.

The late 1960s saw the advent of commercial overland travel. Companies started offering overland tours to groups in large, specially equipped trucks. Mostly in Africa, these journeys could last for months, and relied heavily on the participation of the paying passengers for food preparation, food purchasing and setting up camp. The ultimate of these adventures was always the 'trans', or the complete journey from Europe to Cape Town in South Africa. Commercial overlanding has since expanded to all the continents of the world. The Truck Surf Hotel is an overlanding vehicle which, when stationary, expands in five sections to form a two-story, 70 square metres (750 ft^{2}), five-room hotel, and moves from surf break to surf break along the Portuguese and Moroccan coasts.

== Modes of overland travel ==
=== Rail ===
At 9,288 km (5,771 miles), the Trans-Siberian Railway is one of the longest overland journeys in existence today, taking seven days to reach Vladivostok from Moscow, and providing an alternative to air travel for journeys between Europe and Asia.

The Indian Pacific railway, completed in 1970, links Sydney and Perth in Australia. Covering 4,343 km (2,699 miles) over four days, the railway includes the longest stretch of straight railway line in the world.

=== Road ===
The Silk Route (or Silk Road) historically connects the Mediterranean countries, Persia, India and China with each other. Today the route refers to overland journeys between Europe and China, taking either the northern route - through Russia and Kazakhstan - or the southern route - through Turkey, Iran, Pakistan and North India - to Urumqi or Xi'an in China. These routes are still popular today, with companies offering tours on the southern route.

== Overland routes ==
=== Trans Africa ===
Some of the longest and more traditional overland routes are in Africa. The Cairo to Cape Town and v.v. route covers more than 10,000 km (6,200 miles) and currently usually follows the Nile River through Egypt and Sudan, continuing to Kenya, Tanzania, Malawi, Zimbabwe, Botswana and Namibia along the way. In 1959, the pioneering American trailer manufacturer Wally Byam and a caravan of trailers travelled the route from Cape Town to Cairo, via Rhodesia (now Zimbabwe and Zambia), Belgian Congo (now Democratic Republic of Congo), Uganda and north from Kenya. One of the longest current commercial routes is from Reykjavik, Iceland to Cape town, South Africa.

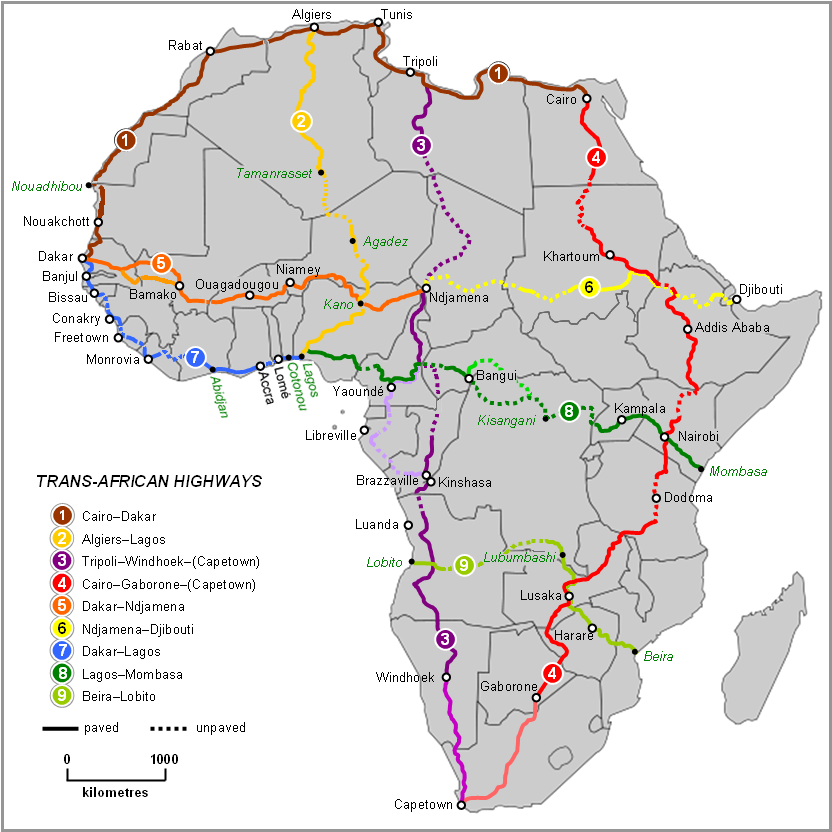
Map of Trans-African Highways

From the mid-1980s, the journey was made impossible by the non-operation of the Aswan to Wadi Halfa ferry between Egypt and Sudan as well as instability in Sudan, northern Uganda and Ethiopia. In recent years however, the Cape to Cairo and Cairo to Cape Town route has again become possible and increasingly popular both with commercial overland trucks carrying groups of 20 or so paying passengers as well as independent travellers on motorcycles or with four-wheel-drive vehicles.

The traditional Trans Africa route is from London to Nairobi, Kenya and Cape Town, South Africa. The route started in the 1970s and became popular with small companies using old Bedford four-wheel-drive trucks carrying about 24 people each, plus many independents, normally run by groups of friends in 4x4 Land Rovers heading out of London from November to March every year. The usual route was from Morocco to Algeria with a Sahara desert crossing into Niger in West Africa, continuing to Nigeria. This was followed by a month-long journey likened to Joseph Conrad's "Heart of Darkness" through the forests of Zaire (now Democratic Republic of Congo), surfacing into the relatively modern world in Kenya via Uganda. From Kenya the last leg was south through Tanzania to either Zimbabwe or South Africa.

This route has changed dramatically due to border closures and political instability creating no-go zones. The route has reversed itself somewhat over the last few years, with trucks now crossing from the north to the south of Africa, closely following the west coast all the way from Morocco to Cape Town with the biggest change in the route being made possible by the opening of Angola to tourism. The journey then continues through Southern and East Africa from Cape Town to Nairobi and on to Cairo.

=== Panamericana ===
The Panamericana Route is considered to be the longest route in the world, even though it is not continuously navigable between Panama and Colombia. The official route layout is controversial, thus different variants are circulating. In the south of the island of Chiloé in Quellón, for example, a monument commemorates the southern end of the Pan~~-~~americana. However, it is also said to lead from Anchorage, Alaska to there and to be 22,000 km long. Other sources see the route from the northernmost point of the double continent, it lies on Prudhoe Bay, leading to Ushuaia in southern Patagonia. According to Google Maps, however, this route “only” adds up to 22,000 km too. Either way, travellers will hardly stick to the direct route, as there are only a few places worth seeing and only little interesting landscapes along this main route. Highlights are rarely along this fast-connecting route, sometimes even far away. It is therefore not surprising that the travelled route stretches normally over a multiple of this, not least because for Europeans the ports of arrival and return are thousands of kilometres away from the start and finish of the "Panam".

The route from Alaska to Tierra del Fuego, or in the opposite direction, is very popular, not least because it can be undertaken without any major formalities and not even a specially equipped vehicle is needed. Another advantage is that communication with the local population on almost the entire two semi-continents is possible using only two languages, namely English and Spanish.

This is important, because knowledge of foreign languages is not very widespread among the local population in either North or Latin America.

Are there any special arguments for travelling from north to south or in the opposite direction? Yes, if you start in North America, you have the following advantages: in the first few months of travel the trip takes place in a largely known social system for travellers from Europe or generally from western-oriented countries and cultural environment. Of course, there will still be many new and different encounters to deal with, but the lifestyle and social customs are still similar. In addition, the two most expensive countries, the USA and Canada, are visited at the beginning of the trip, when the budget has not yet been stretched and therefore allows more leeway.

The start of a trip in South America is actually only advised if the start of the trip must or should be between October and February. Then winter prevails in North America while spring or summer arrives on the South American continent.

Since the road between Panama and Colombia is not continuous, it will be necessary to ship the vehicle around the Darian Gap. This is usually organized between Colon~~,~~ in Panama and Cartagena in~~,~~ Colombia. Since right-hand drive vehicles are not allowed to enter Nicaragua and Costa Rica, these cars are usually shipped from and to Veracruz in~~,~~ Mexico. Depending on the size of the vehicle, sea transport is anyway a significant cost factor.

Many travellers from Europe start on the east coast of North America and drive from there to northern Alaska to begin the long journey south. For this variant, the start should best be placed in spring.

Overall, the route is very varied and offers many highlights for all interests:

• The vast and untouched regions of the extreme north and south

• The countless and unique national parks along the route

• Indigenous cultures from Alaska to Mexico to South America

• A very diverse flora and fauna

• Climate zones from arctic to tropical

• Altitudes from below to over 5000 metres above sea level

• Interesting cuisine, especially in Latin America

• Latino hospitality and lifestyle

Most travellers take around two years to complete this route. This period will allow taking appropriate detours in remote and interesting regions. A total of around 70,000 to 100,000 km must be expected. With the exception of the USA, no visa is required for most nationals in any other.

=== Silk Road ===
The classic Silk Road leads from the Middle East to China. Travel routes, even if they are based on the Silk Road, follow the ancient route only partially and can include any number of variants and detours. A common route is the journey via the Balkans to Turkey and then through Iran and the Stan countries to China.

Afterwards, the journey can lead back to Europe through Mongolia and via Russia, or further to Southeast Asia.

Highlights:

• Most countries are still not burdened by mass-tourism

• Old cultures can still be experienced up close

• The typical hospitality of the residents

• Enormous mountain landscapes

• Architectural jewels along the Silk Road

When determining the start date of the journey, the schedule should be coordinated with the climatic conditions. Some regions along the route only have short time windows in which the travel conditions are optimal. Either the journey leads east in a single season or a very slow pace is chosen in order to avoid unfavourable climatic conditions. The route via Turkey, Iran and further through the Stan countries to China largely follows the Silk Road. Time-consuming formalities and an expensive guide are necessary to cross China. If a small group organizes itself, you can share and reduce the costs.

All countries along the Silk Road belong to the low-cost regions and the visa fees are also affordable, as more and more countries are doing without them entirely. If you do not travel further in the east or if you do not decide to take a round trip back to Europe, an expensive return transport is required in the end. Therefore, it is usually avoided.

A CdP is usually required for the vehicle because Iran, along with a few other Asian countries, requires it. Linguistically speaking, knowledge of Russian, which is often spoken in the Stan countries and in Russia itself, is most likely to help. Otherwise, a variety of "exotic" languages, at least from the point of view of people with a Western language background, is the rule.

=== Hippie Trail ===
This travel route was created from Europe to Nepal or even further to Goa or Southeast Asia in the 1960s and 70s. At that time, of course, there was still largely no touristic infrastructure. Often people were travelling with old buses and VW vans, a real adventure indeed. After the hype at the time, it was quiet about this route, but even today it is one of the most travelled routes in the world, albeit only partially and with modifications.

The route still has a certain appeal and it is also much easier to tackle than it used to be. However, the route will have to be adjusted, especially because of the political situation in Afghanistan. And even today, the road connection from India to Southeast Asia is difficult to access for tourists. Some travellers circumnavigate the region via China. Unfortunately, this variant is complex to organize and, because of the mandatory guide, also very expensive. Shipping from India to Southeast Asia or Australia is therefore a popular option.

=== Asia Overland ===
For a planned trip around the world, the route from Central Europe through Russia to the easternmost port of Vladivostok is an interesting option. However Russia is big, and the lonely expanse of Siberia doesn't offer that much. Detours, variants and deviations can be planned, in order to provide more variety. On a more southern route, some of the Stan countries can be integrated and Mongolia is almost on the way.

If this route is chosen, knowledge of Russian language is definitely a great advantage.

=== Other routes ===
In Africa, commercial overland travel began with Trans Africa and Cape to Cairo described above. From the mid-1980s, eastern and southern Africa became more sought after by tourists and Nairobi to Cape Town is now the most travelled overland route in Africa. As more tourists look for adventure trips that fit into their annual holiday, shorter sections of overland routes have become available such as two- to three-week round trip from Nairobi taking in Kenya and Uganda and the very popular Cape Town to Victoria Falls, Zimbabwe (travelling through the highlights of Namibia and Botswana).

Istanbul to Cairo, via Syria and Jordan, is a classic overland route. It is a route that has been travelled for centuries, particularly during the Ottoman Empire. Historically it overlapped with the Hajj, with many people covering all or part of the route as part of their pilgrimage to Mecca. Backpackers discovered it in the 1970s and 1980s, with hippies searching for spiritual peace who departed to Jerusalem from Istanbul instead of going to India via Iran, Afghanistan and Pakistan. After the peace treaty between Egypt and Israel, onward travel from Jerusalem to Cairo became a possibility. It is now well travelled by backpackers and overland companies alike although the number of travellers journeying the route can be affected by any unrest in neighbouring countries.

== See also ==
- Motorcycle touring
- London–Calcutta bus service
- Truck Surf Hotel
- Van-dwelling
- Stock route
- Off-roading
- Adventure travel
- Bicycle touring
- Trekking
- Grand touring
