= Boatshed =

Lockable wooden sheds for small private boats

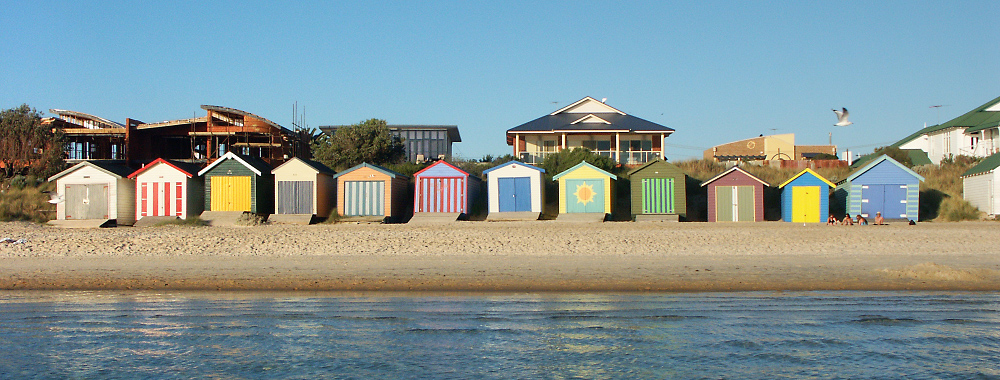
Boatsheds on the beach at Edithvale, Victoria, Australia.

Boatsheds are generally lockable wooden sheds, often brightly colored, that were originally built to securely store small private boats and bathing materials directly on beaches. They are similar in appearance to beach huts (or "bathing boxes"), with the main difference being an integrated boat launching ramp directly to the beach (although some ramps have been replaced with steps, reflecting changes in usage). Many boatsheds also incorporate heavy-duty winches, which are used to winch a boat up from the water and back into the boatshed.

Boatsheds are typically around 6.2 m long × 3.0 m wide × 2.4 m high, which is somewhat larger than local bathing boxes (typically only 2.4 m long × 2.0 m wide × 2.0 m high). Boatsheds have a roof pitch of around 30°, which is somewhat shallower than the 35° roof pitch of local bathing boxes.

Port Phillip Bay and Western Port Bay in Victoria, Australia, are currently home to about 1860 boatsheds, bathing boxes and similar structures.

== See also ==
- Beach hut (bathing box)
- Boathouse
