= Ebrington (Brighton) =

Historic house in Victoria, Australia

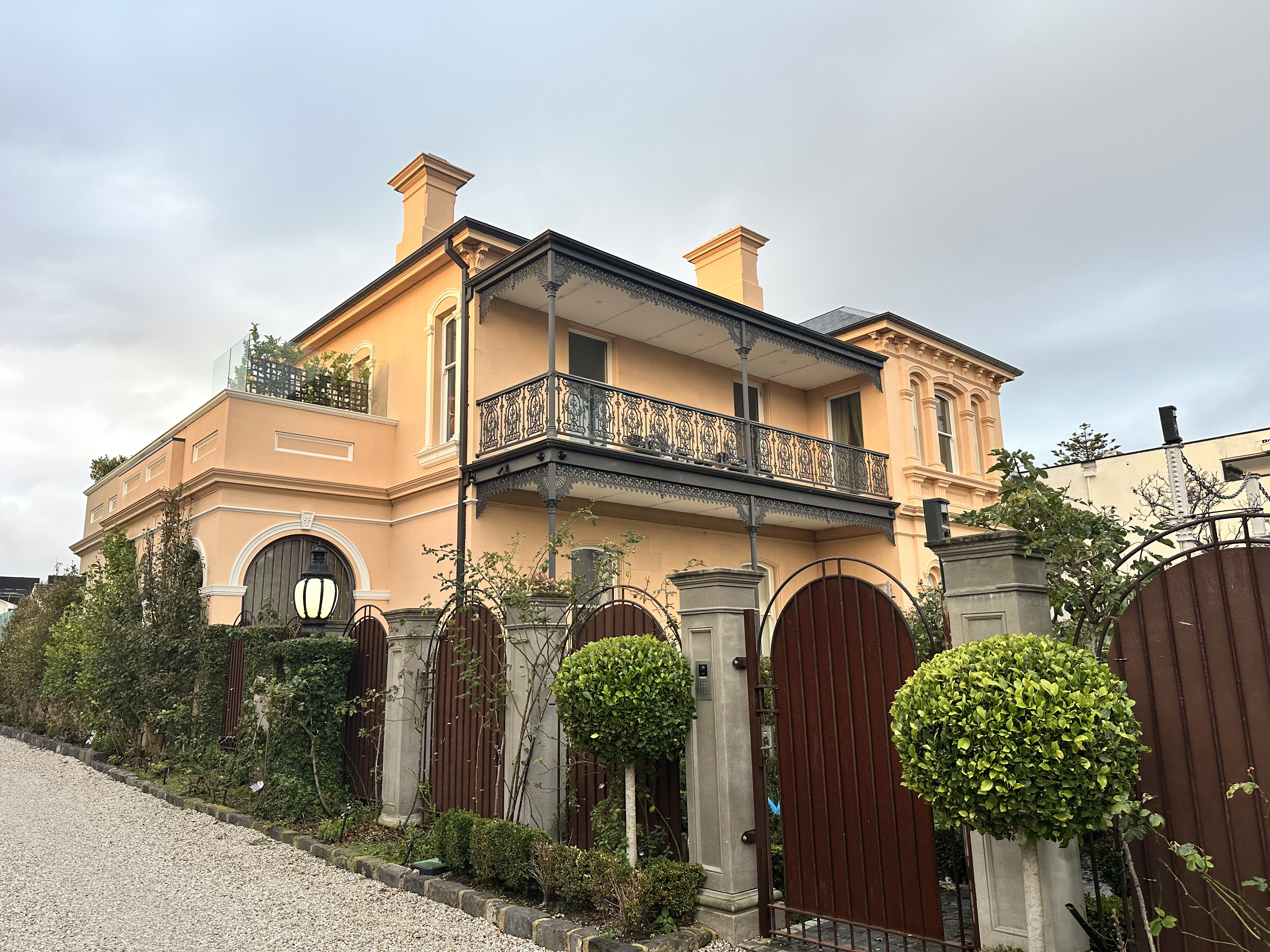
- Interactive map of the Ebrington area

General information
- Type: House
- Architectural style: Italianate
- Location: 23 South Road, Brighton, Melbourne, Victoria, Australia
- Coordinates: 37.9273°S 144.9909°E
- Completed: 1882

Ebrington is a historic nineteenth-century residence located at 23 South Road, in the Melbourne suburb of Brighton, Victoria, Australia. Constructed in 1882, the house was built for Sarah Ann Kyte, widow of Ambrose Kyte, and forms part of the concentration of substantial Victorian-era villas developed in Brighton during the late nineteenth century.

== History ==
The land on which Ebrington stands formed part of a subdivision of South Road land offered for sale in April 1882. Contemporary advertisements described the allotments as being particularly suitable for "two storey detached houses, terraces or first class villas" due to their proximity to Brighton's railway station, bathing facilities and pier.

Ebrington was subsequently constructed in 1882 for Sarah Ann Kyte (née Finnin). Sarah, who was the widow of the wealthy merchant and politician Ambrose Kyte, inherited a large sum of money upon Ambrose's death in 1868.

Mrs Kyte sought out a general servant to help around the house, and an advertisement was placed in the Argus newspaper in 1883.

On 12th December 1884, Mary Jane Parsons, aged between 11 and 12, ran away from the house and a notice was subsequently advertised in The Age.

Sarah remained at the house until her death there on 3rd August 1904. She was then interred at Brighton General Cemetery. Sarah's son Hugh lived at the house until his death in 1919. Hugh Kyte's widow Theresa Victoria Kyte continued to live at the house until her death on October 29 1925.

James Maginnis, of the firm Lloyd Bros. & Maginnis, died whilst visiting the house on 6 December 1929 at the age of 68.

Ownership remained in the Kyte family until the 10 March 1951, after the death of Fanny Kyte.

The property was last sold on 10 November 2009, and the house has since been classified as a heritage place within the Bayside Heritage Overlay.

== See also ==
- Brighton Beach railway station
