= Tankerton Slopes =

Biological Site of Special Scientific Interest in Whitstable, Kent

- Site of Special Scientific Interest
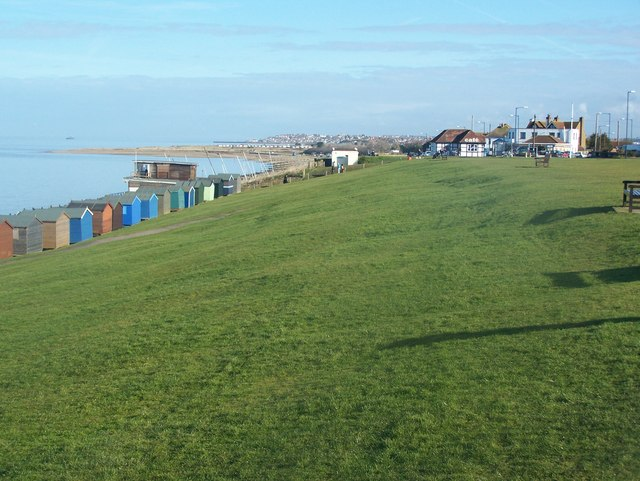

- Location within Kent
- Location of Tankerton Slopes.
- Area of search: Kent
- Grid reference: TR 121 672
- Coordinates: 51.364°N 1.045°E
- Interest: Biological
- Area: 2.3 hectares (5.7 acres)
- Notification date: 1986
- Location map: Magic Map

Tankerton Slopes is a 2.3-hectare (5.7-acre) biological Site of Special Scientific Interest in Whitstable in Kent. It is part of the Tankerton Slopes and Swalecliffe Special Area of Conservation

This north facing slope has a population of tall herbs, including the largest population in Britain of hog’s fennel, a nationally rare umbellifer. Fauna include agonopterix putridella, a nationally rare moth whose larvae feed exclusively on hog's fennel.

There is access to the site from Tankerton Beach. The height of Tankerton slopes vary across the site, but are approximately 50 feet (15 metres) high when measured from the promenade or 66 feet (20 metres) in elevation from sea level.

The bottom of the slope is fronted by Beach huts, and has a promenade that runs from Whitstable to Swalecliffe that is popular with dog walkers and cyclists.

At the top of the slope to the West is a beacon that works by having a wood-based fire in a basket that is on top of a long wooden post.

The site also offers a view in the distance of the "red sands" Maunsell Forts of the Thames Estuary, the forty five wind turbines of Kentish Flats Offshore Wind Farm, the Isle of Sheppey and at the West-end "The Street" a "Spit of land" that appears at low-tide and allows walking 750 meters into the sea

== Gallery ==
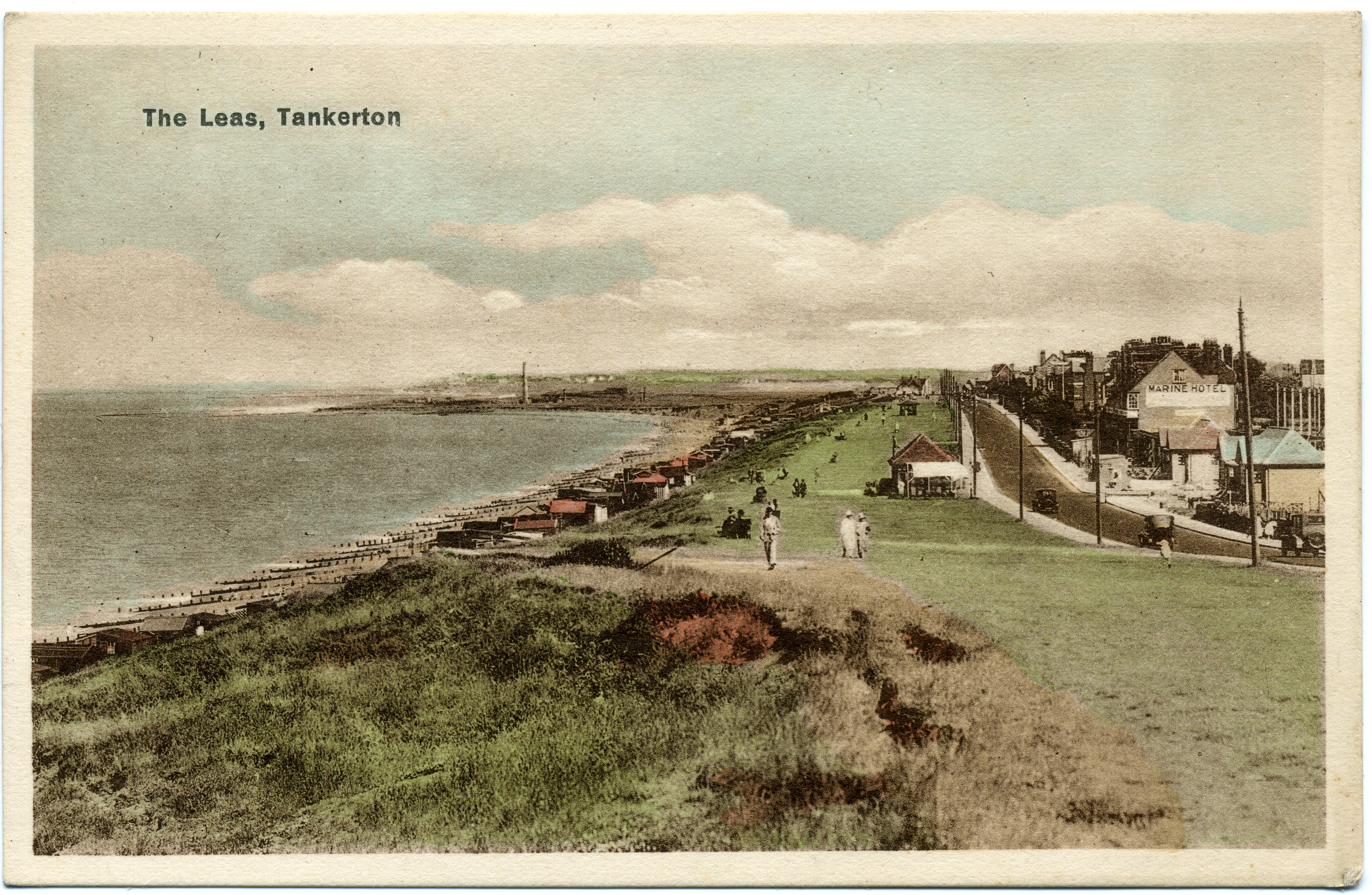
Tinted photograph on postcard dated around 1905-1914 showing "The Leas"

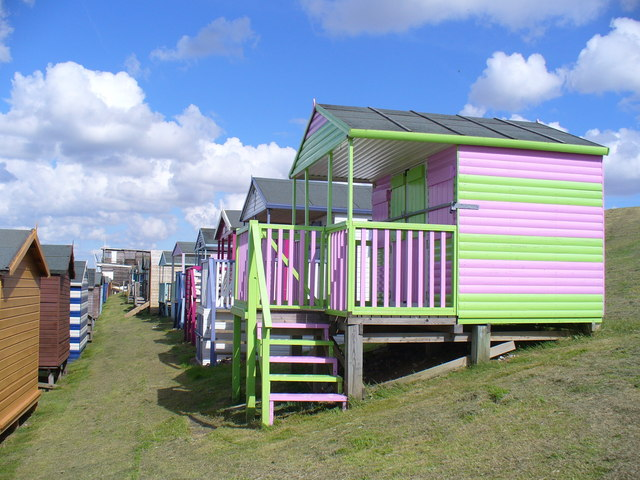
Colourful rows of wooden huts on the grassy slopes of "Tankerton slopes" below Marine Parade

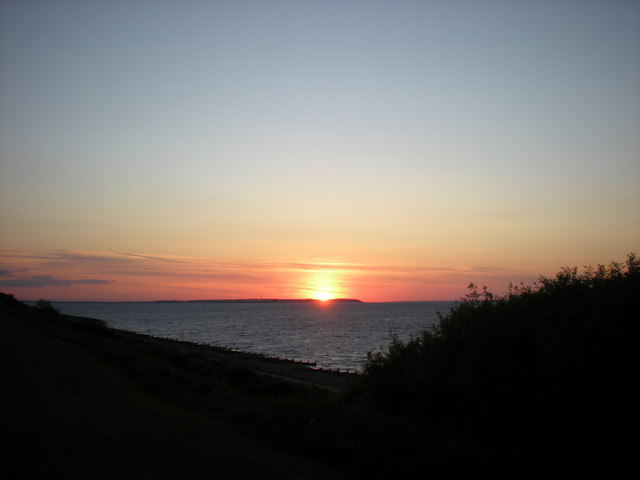
Sunset from Tankerton Slopes towards Sheppey - geograph.org.uk - 1564606

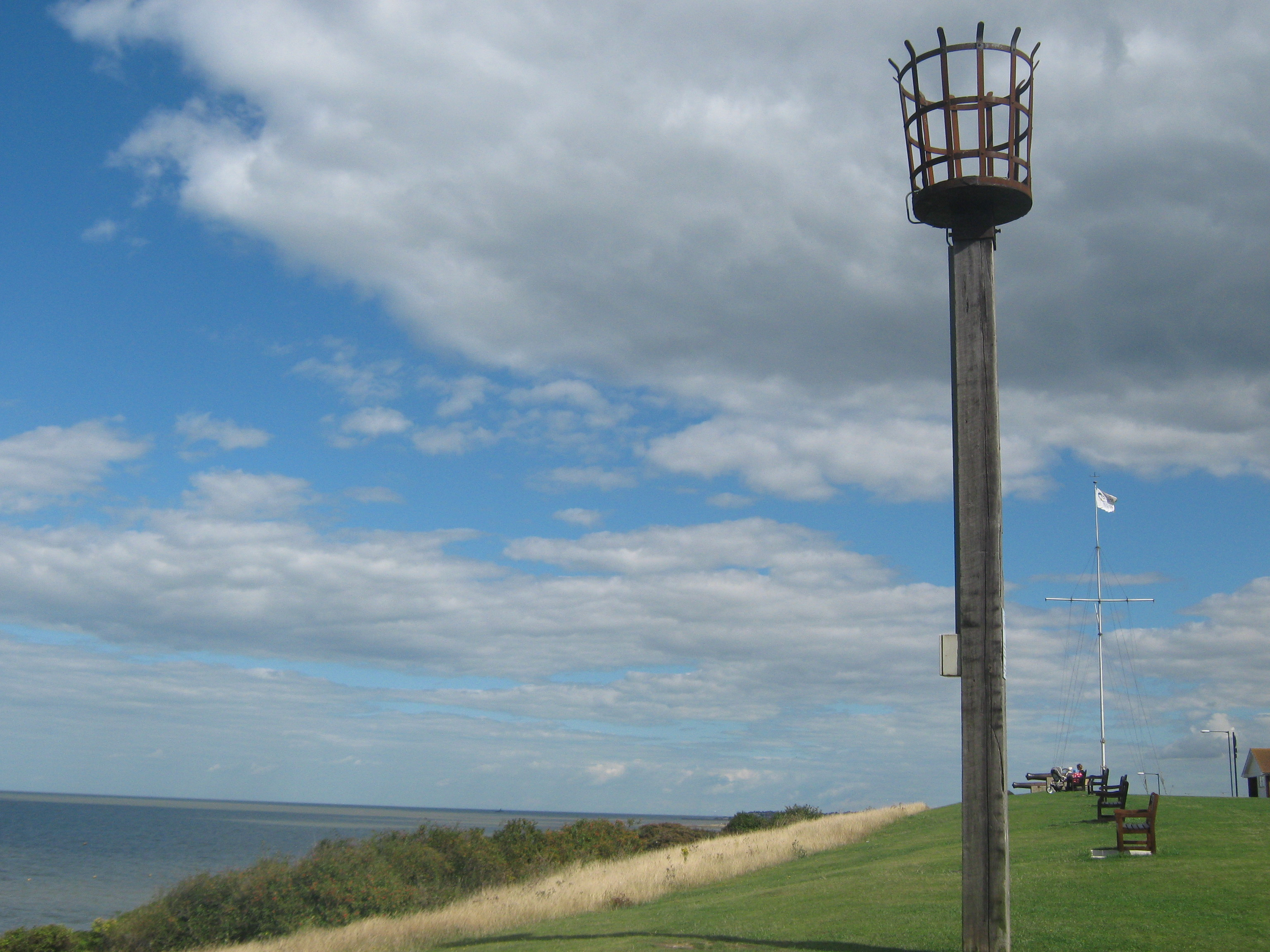
Tankerton Beacon

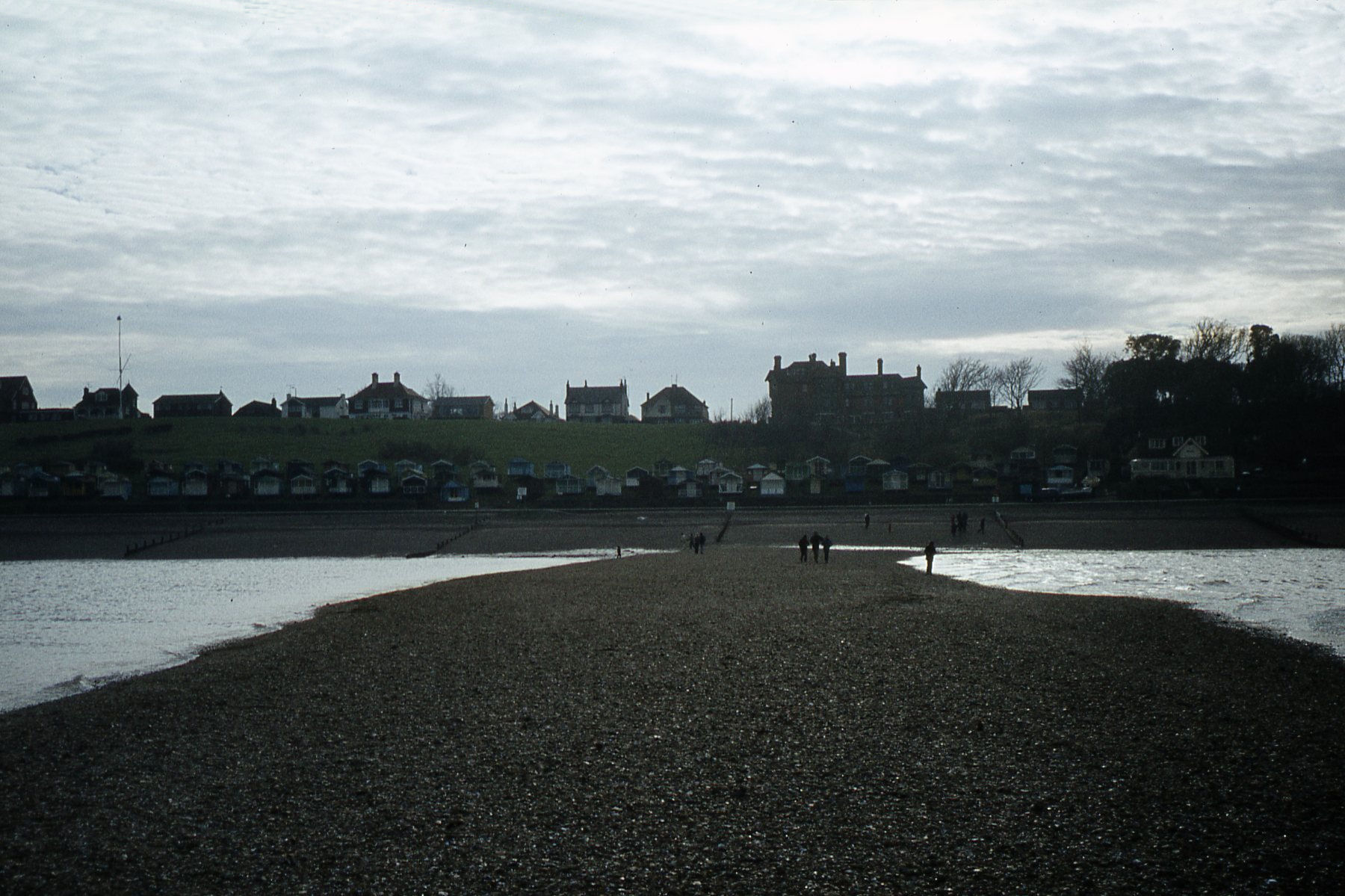
Tankerton Slopes as seen from "The Street"
