= Brighton Bathing Boxes =

Heritage-listed beach huts in Melbourne, Victoria, Australia

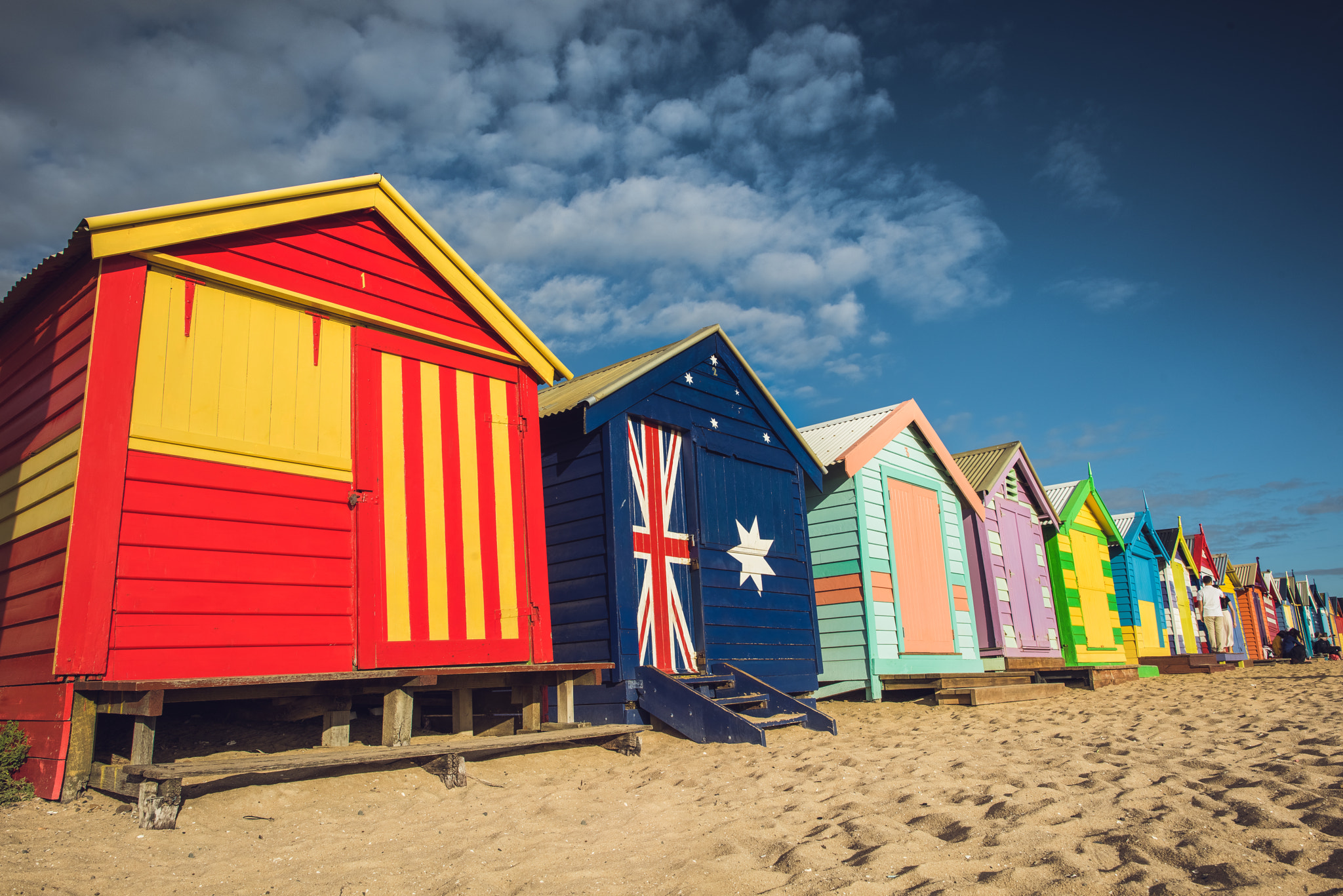
Brighton Bathing Boxes, 2016

The Brighton Bathing Boxes, also called the Brighton Beach Bathing Boxes and the Brighton Beach Huts, are located adjacent to The Esplanade, fronting Dendy Street Beach, in Brighton, in the City of Bayside, in the south eastern suburbs of Melbourne, in Victoria, Australia.

The 96 bathing boxes extend over 500 metres (1,600 ft) along the beachfront, behind the Dr Jim Willis Reserve, the last vestige of natural vegetation along Brighton's foreshore; in an area of high Aboriginal sensitivity protected by both State and Federal legislation.

The highly colourful bathing boxes are a significant tourist attraction in the area. The coastline has long been a popular subject for artists and continues to attract artistic interest today. (Note: Artists include Fredrick McCubbin, John Mather, May Vale, Charles Douglas Richardson, Charles Aloysius Wilson, Emanuel Phillips Fox and others) It is also an important destination for school groups studying the environment, climate change, coastal processes and land management.

Located on Council-owned land, the owners of each bathing box are individuals or families and the bathing boxes are often passed down through generations; however, they are occasionally auctioned. Seen as a life style investment, limited supply and high demand has driven prices up from $58,000 in 2000 to approximately $400,000, as of 2025.

The bathing boxes were built as changing rooms to maintain the modesty of bathers. They do not have water or electricity connections. Today as well as changing rooms, they are used to store beach equipment and for gatherings of family and friends.

Most of the bathing boxes were built between 1907 - 1933, on the traditional lands of the Bunurong people, the collection of bathing boxes and their setting were added to the Victorian Heritage Register on 2 August 2018 in recognition of their historical, architectural, aesthetic, and social significance.

Man-made coastal structures have caused lasting damage to the Port Phillip coastline by altering natural coastal processes, including the movement of sand northward. Coastal erosion now threatens some of the bathing boxes, which have been protected with sandbags and by artificially replenishing the beach with sand. This regular beach renourishment supports the natural coastal processes and is a better long term strategy.

== History ==
=== Bunurong people ===
The Bunurong people, also known as the Boonwurrung, have a strong ongoing connection with the coastline of Port Phillip and Dendy Street Beach. Their shell middens and stone tools have been observed and remain at Brighton Beach.

Described in 1925 as, "between Middle Brighton Baths, and the Bluff, at Brighton Beach ... In these middens, "scrapers", firestones, stone axes (nearby), the charred broken shells of mussels, "mutton fish" (Haliotis), cockles and periwinkles, are found in abundance. Sometimes splintered bones, perchance those of kangaroo or wallaby. Also lumps of ochre ... are found in the remains of these campfires." In 2014 it was noted that a large midden of shell and charcoal extended behind the bathing boxes. The whole of the Brighton foreshore is designated an area of high aboriginal sensitivity protected by both State and Federal legislation.

=== Bathing Boxes ===
The first bathing box was built in the 1860s further along the Brighton coastline, to protect the modesty of bathers. In the 1890s there were six bathing boxes on Dendy Street Beach and a single bathing box on Middle Brighton Beach.

By 1907, the number of bathing boxes on the Dendy Street Beach had increased to seventeen; (Note: Plans are dated 1907 but likely to based on earlier survey work.) and approximately twenty three ratepayers were noted as owning bathing boxes along the Brighton coastline at that time. By the mid-1910s, the number of bathing boxes had increased to approximately forty on Dendy Street Beach and twenty eight bathing boxes on Middle Brighton Beach.

The number of bathing boxes significantly increased after World War I. By 1933, there were 246 bathing boxes on Dendy Street Beach and Middle Brighton Beach. On Middle Brighton Beach, Bathing Box No.1 was near Park Street and No 111 just south of Wellington Street. On Dendy Street Beach were Boxes No.132 to No 267. Between 1935 and 1936, work was completed to move the bathing boxes to the top of the beach instead of the high-water mark, where they were located previously. In May 1937 Brighton Council decided that bathing boxes on other beaches, in particular Middle Brighton, were to be moved to Dendy Street Beach to allow construction of a sea wall.

Initially built as changing rooms to maintain the modesty of bathers, in the latter part of the twentieth century and beyond, they are used to store beach toys, kayaks, stand-up paddleboards, BBQs and beach furniture. They do not have water or electricity connections. Owners are allowed to repair and restore the boxes including painting the boxes a variety of different bright colours. As of September 2026, with the additional boxes built by the City of Bayside Council, there were 96 boxes.

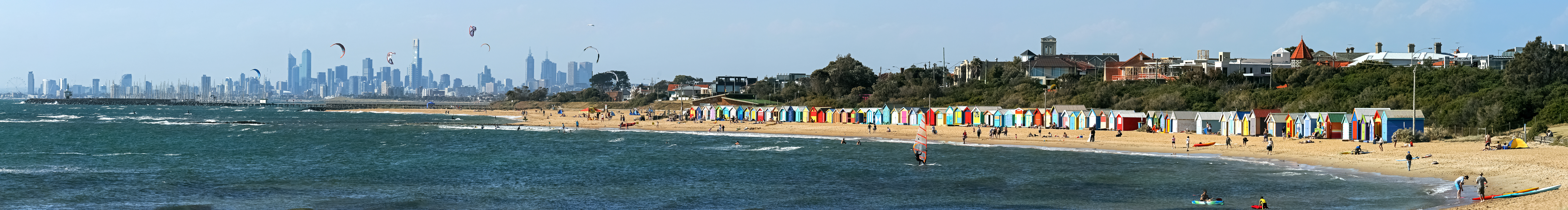
The Brighton Bathing Boxes with the Middle Brighton pier and breakwater, and the Melbourne city skyline in the background

== Location ==
Brighton Bathing Boxes
- Location of the bathing boxes in Greater Metropolitan Melbourne
- Alternative names: Brighton Beach Bathing Boxes; Brighton Beach Huts

General information
- Status: Completed
- Type: Beach huts
- Architectural style: Victorian
- Location: Dendy Street Beach, The Esplanade, Brighton, City of Bayside, Melbourne, Victoria, Australia
- Coordinates: 37°55′08″S 144°59′14″E
- Year built: From c. 1850s–
- Completed: c.1850; 176 years ago
- Landlord: City of Bayside

Technical details
- Material: Weatherboard; timber; corrugated iron
- Size: c. 100 individual huts
- Floor area: 20 to 25 m^{2} (220 to 270 sq ft) each hut

Victorian Heritage Register
- Official name: The Brighton Bathing Boxes and Dendy Street Beach
- Type: Registered place
- Criteria: a., d., e., g.
- Designated: 2 August 2018
- Reference no.: H2369
- Heritage overlay no.: HO143
- Category: Recreation and Entertainment

The bathing boxes are located on Dendy Street Beach between Gould Point (opposite Gould Street) and Rocky Point, adjacent to the Brighton Lifesaving Club.

== Description ==
The bathing boxes are built in a uniform way with Victorian features, painted weatherboard and corrugated iron roof, due to a Planning Scheme Heritage Overlay. Owners are allowed to paint their boxes causing a mass of different bright colours. They do not have water or electricity connections; are unable to connect solar panels or any form of motor. The owners are required to pay an annual license fee plus rates on the box and must also take out public liability insurance cover.

== Disputes and Conservation of the Bathing Boxes ==
Possibly the first dispute over the construction of a bathing box occurred in 1862 over a bathing box illegally erected on private property, and subsequently moved without appropriate approvals to Crown Land below the high tide mark.

During the 1920s and 1930s the large number of bathing boxes, storm damage and their disrepair, prompted calls to abolish the granting of licenses and remove them from the beach.

In 1983, the Coastal Caucus Committee decided to phase out 2,000 buildings along the Port Phillip Bay, including the Brighton bathing boxes. Amongst others, the Brighton Bathing Box Association decided to fight the decision, and in 1985 the Bathing Boxes were recommended for retention, and added to the Victorian Heritage Register in 2000.

In 2009, the City of Bayside Council built nine more boxes at the southern end of the beach to raise money during the Great Recession, increasing the number to 88. This was done despite the objections of heritage groups, as boxes previously built there had flooded. By 2017 the Council had built another five boxes, raising the total number to 93 with another three scheduled for construction over the following two years.

In 2019, the Draft Marine and Coastal Policy document proposed that the boxes be removed or relocated, causing backlash online and condemnation from the Victorian Liberal Party and Member for Brighton James Newbury, with Newbury calling the plan 'crazy'. Acting Premier Lisa Neville accused Newbury of fearmongering, stating, “This is a nonsense coming from the Liberal Party.”

== The Broader Setting: Coastline, Environmental Processes and Land Management ==
=== Brighton Beach Reserve and the Dr Jim Willis Reserve ===
The land from The Esplanade to the high water mark of Dendy Street Beach is within the Brighton Beach Reserve vested to the Mayor, Councillors and Burgesses of the Borough of Brighton for public recreation by the Brighton Land Vesting Act, (Vic.) 1877. Within the reserve and behind Dendy Street Beach lies the Dr Jim Willis Reserve, an area of geomorphological and regional vegetation significance.

The historical sea levels of Port Phillip can be interpreted at this location. At the end of the last ice age rising global sea levels flooded Port Phillip to approximately one to two metres (three to seven feet) higher than the sea level, as of 2011. According to the information sign at this location, the waves of Port Phillip are likely to have actively eroded the escarpment of the Brighton Coastal Plain here.

However approximately 2,000 years Before Present (BP), the entrance to Port Phillip was blocked to the ocean and the salt water gradually evaporated. A flat grassy plain with a central lake fed by surrounding rivers emerged on the previously submerged land . As is the oral history of the Bunurong and supported by recent scientific research, the ocean again flooded Port Phillip about 1,000 years BP. Sea levels were lower at this time and likely never reached the base of the escarpment enabling Holloway Bend beach and Brighton dunes to develop and protect the previously eroding coastline.

The reserve contains a plant community of regional significance being the last vestige of natural vegetation to be found anywhere along Brighton's foreshore. In 1994 Jim (Dr J.H. Willis A.M.) wrote:

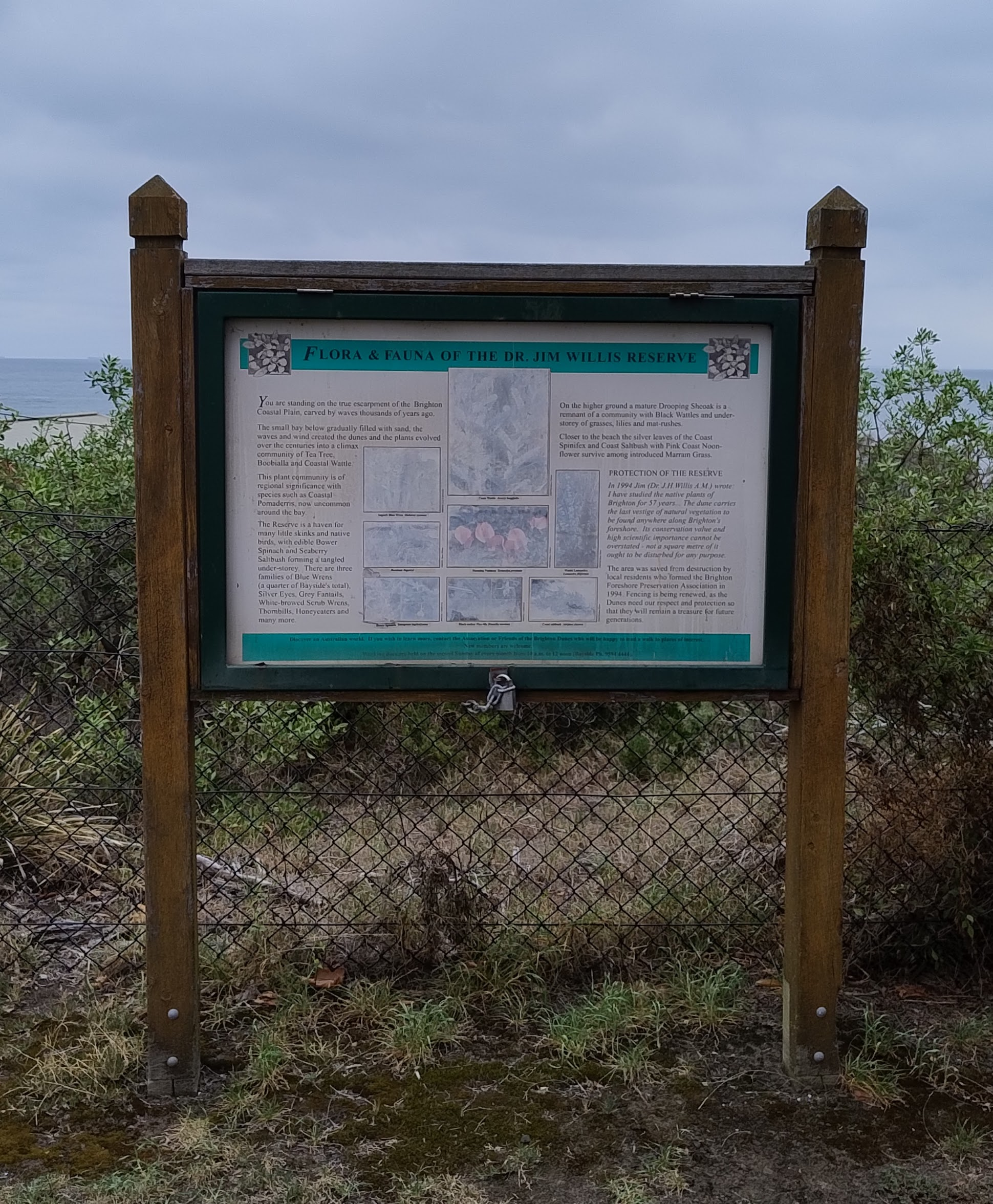
I have studied the native plants of Brighton for 57 years ... The dune carries the last vestige of natural vegetation to be found anywhere along Brighton's foreshore. Its conservation value and high scientific importance cannot be overstated - not a square metre of it ought to be disturbed for any purpose. (Note: A sign describing the flora and fauna in the Dr Jim Willis Reserve The Dr Jim Willis Reserve Information Signs titled Flora and Fauna of the Dr Jim Willis Reserve states: "You are standing on the true escarpment of the Brighton Coastal Plain, carved by waves thousands of years ago. The small bay below gradually filled with sand, the waves and wind created the dunes and the plants evolved over the centuries into a climax community of Tea Tree, Boobialla and Coastal Wattle. This plant community is of regional significance with species such as Coastal Pomaderris, now uncommon around the bay. The Reserve is a haven for many little skinks and native birds, with edible Bower Spinach and Seaberry Saltbush forming a tangled understory. There are three families of Blue Wrens (a quarter of Bayside's total), Silver Eyes, Grey Fantails, White-browed Shrub Wrens, Thornbills, Honeyeaters and many more. On the higher ground a mature drooping she oak is a remnant of a community with Black Wattles and understory of grasses, lilies and matt rushes Closer to the beach the silver leaves of the Coast Spinifex and the Coast Salt Bush with Pink Coast Noonflower survive among introduced Marram Grass. Protection of the reserve" In 1994 Jim (Dr J.H. Willis A.M.) wrote: "I have studied the native plants of Brighton for 57 years ... The dune carries the last vestige of natural vegetation to be found anywhere along Brighton's foreshore. Its conservation value and high scientific importance cannot be overstated - not a square metre of it ought to be disturbed for any purpose. The area was saved from destruction by the local residents who formed the Brighton Foreshore Preservation Association in 1994. Fencing is being renewed, as the Dunes need our respect and protection so that they will remain a treasure for future generations.")

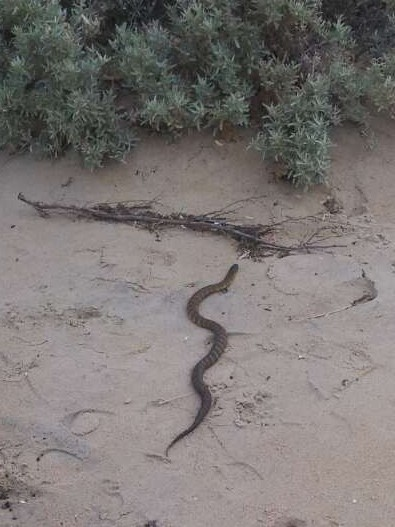
A tiger snake at Dendy Street Beach, 2014

Plants include tea tree, coastal wattle, boobialla, coastal pomodoris, bower spinach, running postman, black anther flax lily, wattle lomandra, drooping she oak, mat rushes, coast salt bush, coast spinifex, black wattle, pink coast noon flower, and seaberry salt bush. The foreshore vegetation near the beach is a habitat for a variety of native animals including the superb fairywren, shrub wren, little wattlebird, micro bat, blue tongue lizards, and tiger snakes, as well as introduced species such as the red fox, rabbit, and brown rat.

According to the Victorian Fisheries Authority, the intertidal zone in Port Phillip Bay, from the high-water mark to where the water is 2 metres (6 ft 7 in) deep at any time, is a protected area; and crabs, marine snails, sea urchins and shellfish cannot be collected. This includes molluscs such as abalone, limpets, periwinkles and turbo shells. Restrictions and penalties apply if removed from the beach or water.

=== Coastal processes, geomorphology and erosion ===
Some of the bathing boxes are at threat of erosion, which has caused sandbags to be installed to stop flooding. Sand has also been trucked in, in an attempt to stop erosion and replenish sand on the beach. Beach renourishment is done on a regular basis or as needed. In 2022, the Council spent $245,000 on a beach renourishment relocating sand from Middle Brighton Beach. In November 2026, for an indicative cost of $265,000, the southern end of the beach was again renourished by the Council to support natural coastal processes.

Originally the erosion of cliffs along the coast of Port Phillip supplied the sand that formed the beaches of the Brighton Beach coastline. The construction of seawalls and other erosion management works has stopped the supply of sand and the beaches are no longer being naturally replenished. Beaches are now renourished artificially including Brighton Beach (1987), Dendy Street Beach (1982 -1983 and 2022) and Middle Brighton Beach (1982–83). However, the complex and interrelated processes by which sand moves along the coast still occur, but with sand from the renourished beaches.

Wind-driven waves move sand up and down the coast both onshore and close inshore. In summer sand is moved to the north, and in winter to the south. Within this seasonal oscillation, there is a gradual accumulation and then loss of sand northwards along Brighton Beach coastline. Natural reefs off Holloway Bend and Dendy Street Beach temporarily capture the sand and slow its movement northwards. These coastal processes are demonstrated by sand moving north past Green Point to create a sand spit and lagoon across Holloway Bend between 1987 -1990. Also the gradual build up of sand at the renourished Middle Brighton Beach and its movement north past the manmade Park Street groyne to create beachlets can be readily observed.

Northward sand drift from Holloway Bend and Dendy Street Beach is captured by the groyne at Middle Brighton Beach until it has accumulated to its tip. The sand then moves past the groyne progressively filling and bypassing the smaller reefs and groynes to the north. Ultimately the sand collects behind the Brighton Yacht Club marina in a triangular spit. The small amount of sand that escapes that entrapment doesn't collect along the seawall north of the yacht club, but is moved deeper into the bay by strong reflective waves from the seawalls. Once further offshore, the predominant sand drift of Hobsons Bay bypasses the beaches of the Brighton coastline, and moves the sand south to beyond Rickets Point Beaumaris.

These coastal processes mean that where a groyne, breakwater or other structure prevents waves from a particular direction but allows others, sand will accumulate in the sheltered portion of the foreshore. The impact of sea walls, groynes and breakwaters has had adverse effects. Rather than add to the groyne system it would be preferable to undertake regular beach renourishment.

In response to climate change and to manage future coastal processes it has been recommended that "attempts to stabilise a coastline by building solid structures such as sea walls, or dumping boulder ramparts, should bear in mind that a rising sea level is in prospect, and that coastline processes would resume with the sea at a higher level and these structures submerged. On the other hand, beaches can be renourished at higher sea levels, and the use of artificial beaches to halt coastline recession is a better long-term strategy than building solid structures."

== See also ==
- Architecture of Melbourne
- List of places on the Victorian Heritage Register in the City of Bayside
- Tourism in Melbourne
