= Truck Surf Hotel =

Mobile five-room hotel built on a large truck

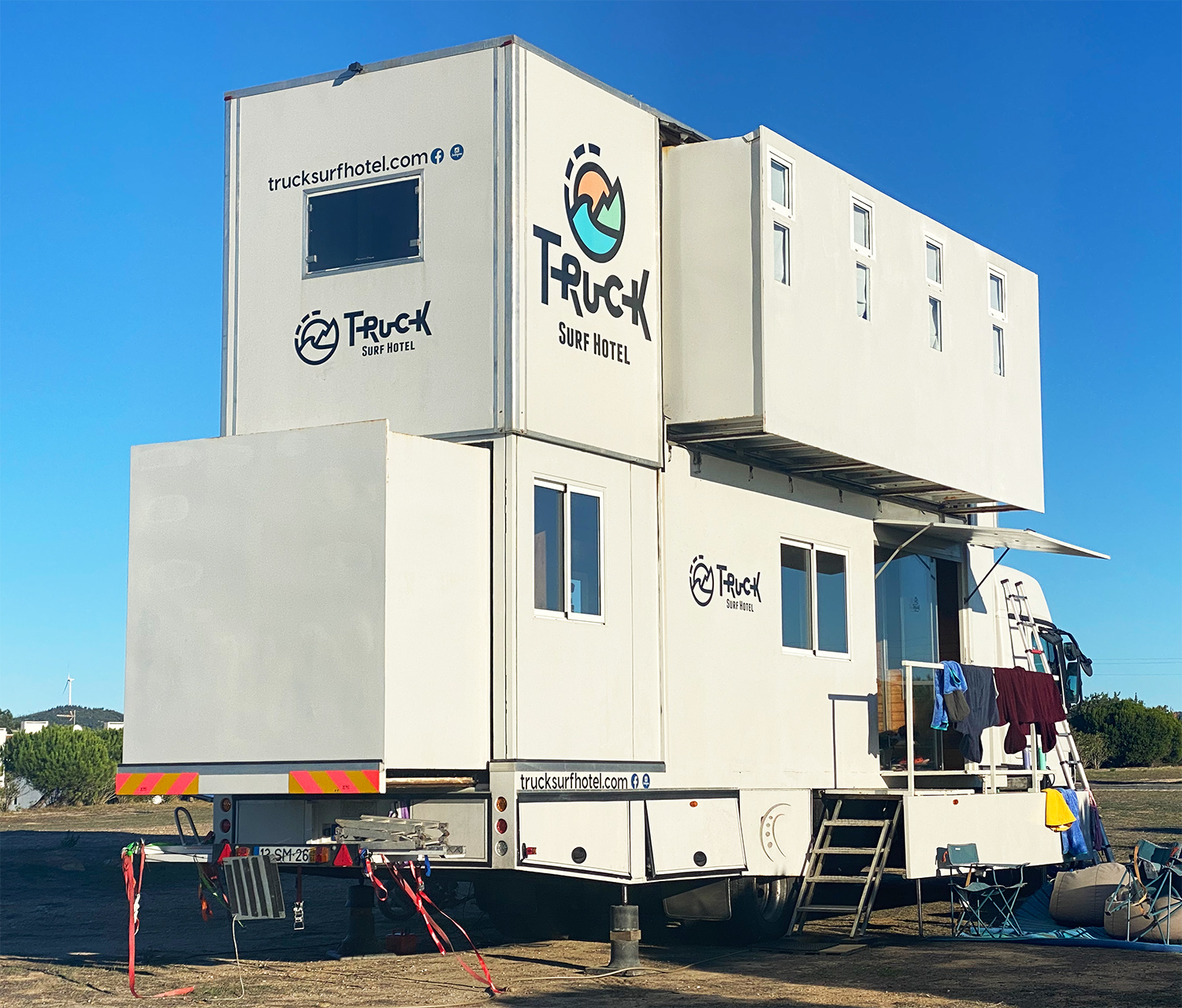

General information
- Type: Mobile Hotel
- Location: Coast of Portugal and Morocco
- Opened: July 2017
- Owner: Daniela Carneiro; Eduardo Ribeiro

Dimensions
- Weight: 19 metric tons (42,000 lb)
- Other dimensions: 12.5 metres (41 ft) expanded length; 6.5 metres (21 ft) expanded height; 4.42 metres (14.5 ft) expanded width; 11.2 metres (37 ft) contracted length; 4 metres (13 ft) contracted height; 2.55 metres (8.4 ft) contracted width

Technical details
- Structural system: Steel frame with rigid insulated fiberglass panels, on a Mercedes Actros 1832 truck chassis
- Floor count: 2
- Floor area: 70 square metres (750 ft^{2})

Design and construction
- Architect: Eduardo Ribeiro
- Known for: Only mobile hotel with private rooms; Caters to surfers

Other information
- Number of rooms: 4 double-occupancy bunk bed; 1 double-occupancy double bed
- Facilities: WiFi; Surfboards; Wetsuits; Transport to beaches

The Truck Surf Hotel is a two-story, five-room bed-and-breakfast hotel built onto a Mercedes Actros truck chassis, which serves the surfing community by following the waves from beach to beach along the coasts of Portugal and Morocco in a weekly cycle. The hotel is a building-sized, multi-tenant equivalent of a recreational vehicle or campervan.

== History ==
As surfers, Daniela Carneiro and Eduardo Ribeiro traveled between surf spots, living in a camper in 2015–2016. In 2016, they conceived of the Truck Surf Hotel as a way to make that life more accessible to others. They purchased the underlying truck in the Netherlands in September 2016, shipped it to Portugal, and began construction of the hotel in December 2016. The hotel was completed in July, 2017, and first saw service at the Motor Beach Festival in Playa de La Espasa, Spain in the same month.

== The truck ==
The underlying truck is a Mercedes Actros 1832, two-axle, two-wheel-drive, truck with an 18-metric-ton (40,000 lb) gross vehicle weight, and a 235 kW (315 hp) diesel engine, which meets EURO III emissions standards.

=== Mechanical ===
The hotel is a self-contained module on the back of the truck, with a 100mm steel box-tube frame and 12mm rigid insulated fiberglass panel walls. When fully contracted for travel, the truck measures 11.2 metres (37 ft) in length, 2.55 metres (8.4 ft) in width, and 4 metres (13 ft) in height. There are four leveling jacks, and the second floor expands upwards, both via hydraulic mechanisms, bringing the expanded height to 6.5 metres (21 ft). A deck expands 85 centimetres (33 in) outward from the "front" (the right side of the truck) of the lower level of the hotel, while the four smaller rooms expand outward from the front of the upper level, and the kitchen and lounge expand 102 centimetres (40 in) outward from the back of the lower level, bringing the overall expanded width to 4.42 metres (14.5 ft). The crew quarters expand 1.3 metres (4.3 ft) to the rear over the motorcycle rack, bringing the overall expanded length to 12.5 metres (41 ft). When expanded, interior ceiling heights are 2.3 metres (7.5 ft). When contracted for travel, the "pop-out" sections are collapsed inward into the otherwise-usable space of the hotel, so the hotel cannot be occupied by guests while underway. The hotel is typically relocated while guests are surfing, and a separate van is used to transport guests to each new location.

=== Electrical ===
The horizontal expansion modules, or "pop-outs," are electrically actuated from the hotel's 12V battery pack, which is independent of the underlying truck's 12V system. The deep-cycle marine battery pack is charged by the solar panels which cover the hotel's roof, with an auxiliary gasoline generator. An inverter supplies 230V, 50 Hz AC electricity within the truck, though the lighting is 12V DC LED and USB charging outlets are colocated with European-standard Schuko AC power points.

=== Plumbing ===
The downstairs is plumbed for hot and cold water and sewage for the toilet, shower and kitchen. There are two 500 litres (130 US gal) fresh and wastewater storage tanks in the bottom of the truck.

=== Air Conditioning ===
There is ducted air conditioning located in the ceiling space between the lower and upper floors, with vents throughout the truck.

=== Internet ===
A 5G cellular modem and WiFi access point in the lounge provide wireless internet access in all rooms.

== The route ==
Portugal and Morocco are among the world's best surfing locations. Six of the world's ten biggest waves surfed records were set in Portugal, and it has many surfable beach breaks. The truck moves on a weekly basis, seeking out good surf along a fixed route. From April through June, the truck follows a route along the southern Portuguese coast; from July through October, the northern Portuguese coast; and November through February, the Moroccan coast.

=== North Portugal ===

200 kilometres (120 mi) along the "Green Coast":

- Vila Praia de Âncora
- Viana do Castelo
- Porto
- Espinho
- Aveiro

=== South Portugal ===

165 kilometres (103 mi) through Alentejo and Algarve:

- Sines
- Vila Nova de Milfontes
- Odeceixe
- Aljezur
- Vila do Bispo
- Sagres
- Lagos

=== Morocco ===

175 kilometres (109 mi) along the western coast:

- Essaouira
- Sidi Kaouki
- Imsouane
- Tamri
- Taghazout
- Agadir

== Lego model ==
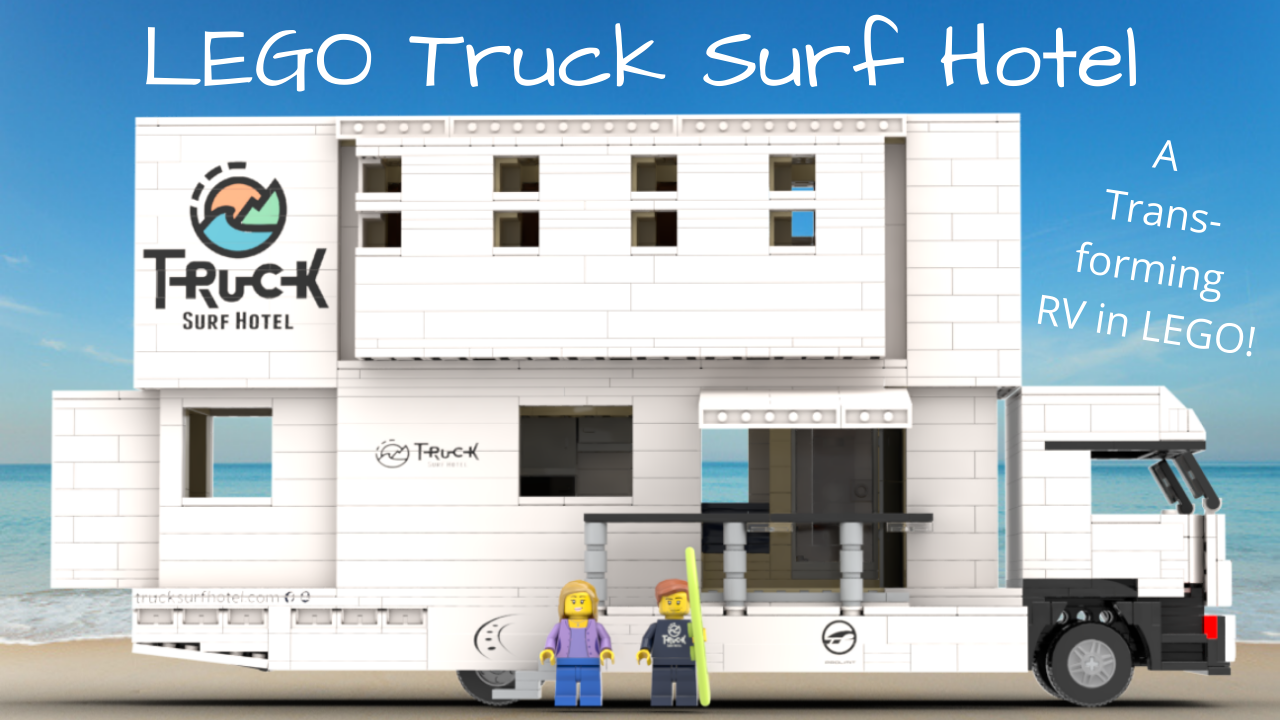
LEGO 1:29 scale model of the Truck Surf Hotel by Bin Le

In September 2021, LEGO enthusiast Bin Le posted a 1:29 scale model of the Truck Surf Hotel to LEGO's crowdsourcing platform, LEGO Ideas. The model has 1,853 parts, and replicates both the mechanical and aesthetic features of the original. Le subsequently published the parts-list of the LEGO blocks necessary to build the model.
