= List of named trains in Victoria =

The Victorian Railways and their successor organisations operated numerous named passenger services, both officially and informally.

Some services were named to highlight their prestige and level of service. Others acquired names simply because they followed a particular roster or timetable. These latter names were often informal at first, and in some cases were later adopted by the Railways.

== Melbourne suburban region ==
The Melbourne Suburban Region of the Victorian Railways network was defined as all stations from the city centre to Dandenong, Gembrook (narrow-gauge from Upper Ferntree Gully), Glen Waverley, Healesville, Hurstbridge, Mornington, Port Melbourne, Red Hill, Sandringham, Somerton, St Albans, St Kilda, Stony Point, Warburton, Werribee, Whittlesea and Williamstown.

=== Suburban Rambler ===
Suburban Rambler
Overview
- Current operator: Steamrail Victoria

Technical
- Track gauge: 1,435 mm (4 ft 8 1/2 in) standard gauge

This name was allocated to tours that started in the city and ran to three or four random destinations in the suburban area.

=== The Boat Train ===
The Boat Train was a short-lived experiment that used a set of Tait trains, specially painted, on shuttle runs between Flinders Street Station and Port Melbourne to meet ships arriving from overseas.

== Western and South Western region ==
The Western and South Western Region of the Victorian Railways network was defined as all stations on the Down (west) side of Sunshine towards Ballarat, and the Down (south-west) side of Werribee. These two mainlines ran through Ballarat to Adelaide, and through Geelong to Port Fairy, respectively. The region also included the branches from these lines to Avoca via either Ararat or Maryborough, Balmoral, Bolangum, Buninyong, Carpolac, Casterton, Coleraine, Crowes via Beech Forest (narrow-gauge), Daylesford via Newlyn, Forrest, Fyansford, Grampians, Inglewood via Llanelly, Maroona via Gheringhap, Millewa South, Morkalla, Mortlake, Mount Gambier via Rennick, Panitya, Patchewollock, Portland, Queenscliff, Redan, Skipton, Timboon, Waubra, Wensleydale, Yaapeet, Yanac and Yelta.

=== Fruit Flyer ===
Fruit Flyer
Overview
- Service type: Freight train
- First service: 13 October 1958
- Former operator: Victorian Railways

Route
- Termini: Mildura; Dynon Freight Terminal
- Stops: Irymple; Red Cliffs; Carwarp; Hattah
- Distance travelled: 566 kilometres
- Average journey time: 10 hours
- Service frequency: 6 x weekly (Sun-Fri)
- Lines used: Mildura; Serviceton

Technical
- Track gauge: 1,600 mm (5 ft 3 in)
- Operating speed: 110 km/h

The Fruit Flyer (also known as the Mildura Fruit Flyer) was a fast overnight freight train operated by the Victorian Railways to bring fruit from the Mildura district to the Melbourne Markets. It first ran on 13 October 1958.

It departed Mildura at 17:00, loading at Irymple, Red Cliffs, Carwarp and Hattah before running express to Dynon Freight Terminal arriving at 03:00. To allow it to operate at the line speed of 110 km/h, the wagons were fitted with bogies similar to those fitted on passenger carriages.

It initially operated three times weekly on Monday, Wednesday and Friday nights, but within a few weeks this had increased to four times. By 1961 it was running six times a week, Sunday to Friday.

=== Geelong Flier ===
The Geelong Flier was a named Australian passenger train operated by the Victorian Railways, running from Melbourne to Geelong and return, which began running in 1926. As the first officially-named flagship service of the Victorian Railways, the train took pride of place on the timetable, and operated with the best available locomotives and rolling stock. In 1927, the outbound journey was extended to Port Fairy and the name was shortened to The Flier.

=== School Train ===
School train
Overview
- Current operator: Victorian Railways

Technical
- Track gauge: 1,600 mm (5 ft 3 in)

This name was given to various trains around the state at different times, all on rosters explicitly designed to take children in regional areas to and from schools. Some operated with rail motors, while others used older passenger carriages such as the PL series.

=== The Overland ===
The Overland is an Australian passenger train service between Melbourne and Adelaide. It first ran in 1887 as the Adelaide Express and has been called the Melbourne Express by South Australians. It was given its current name in 1926. Now operated by the private company Journey Beyond Rail Expeditions, the train completes two return trips a week, covering 828 kilometers between the state capitals. Originally an overnight train, it now operates during the day.

=== The Vinelander and The Sunraysia ===
The Vinelander was operated by the Victorian Railways, and later V/Line between Melbourne and Mildura from 1972 to 1993. Operating overnight along the Mildura line, it included motorail and sleeping-car facilities. From 1987 the train was reduced to only working three nights per week, with three daylight services worked as The Sunraysia.

=== The Westcoaster ===
The Westcoaster
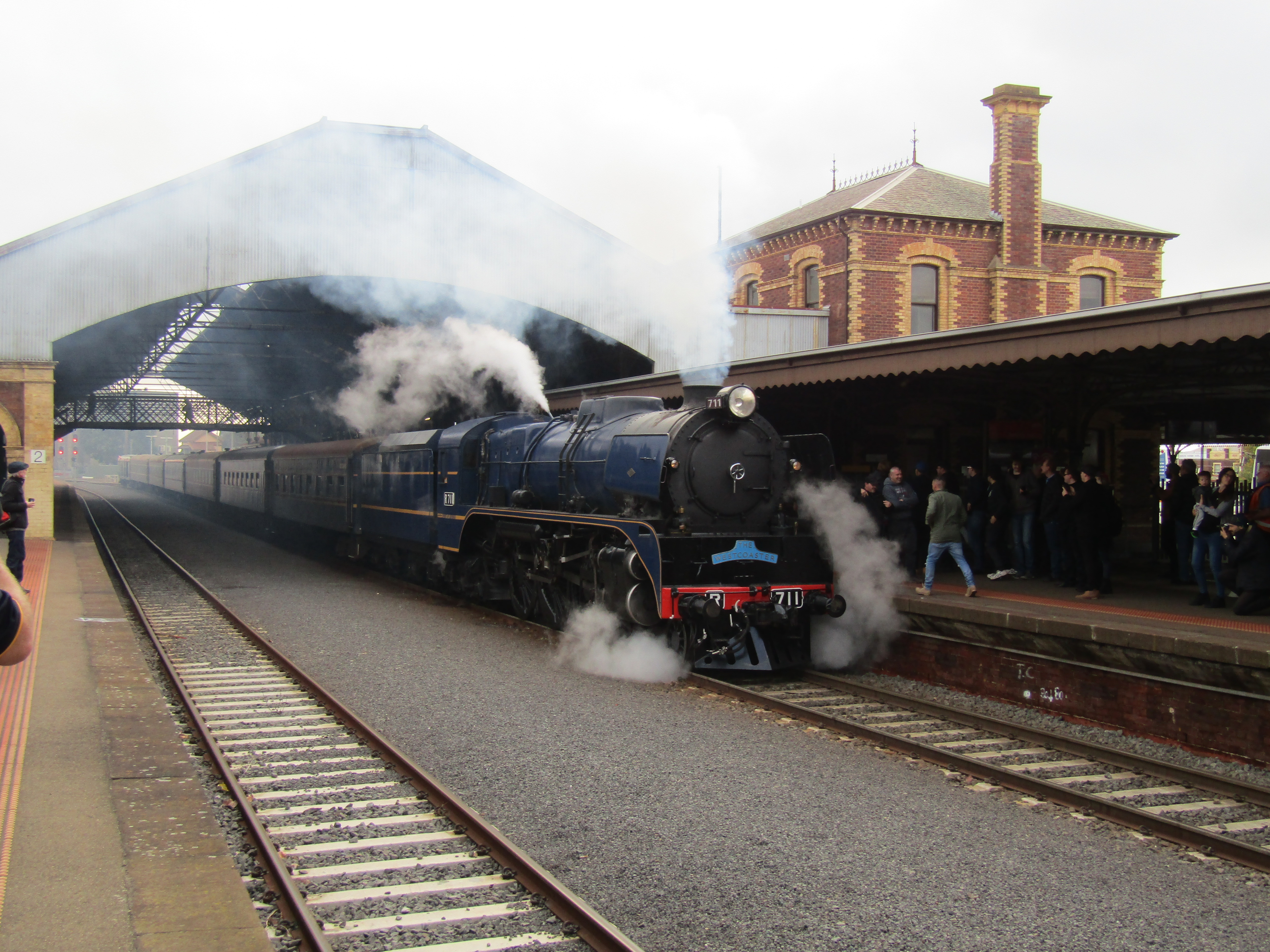

Overview
- First service: 1987
- Former operators: V/Line, West Coast Railway

Route
- Termini: Spencer Street; Warrnambool

Technical
- Track gauge: 1,600 mm (5 ft 3 in)

The Westcoaster was a passenger train operated by the Victorian Railways, running from the state capital, Melbourne, to the regional city of Warrnambool, with buffet facilities available beyond Geelong. The name was first used in 1988. Between 1993 and 2004, the private operator, West Coast Railway (WCR), used the name on its services to and from Warrnambool. After the demise of WCR, the name fell out of use.

=== The Ghan ===
In November 1998, one of the Ghan services from Darwin to Adelaide was extended to Melbourne. The extension was withdrawn in November 2002.

== North-Eastern region ==
The North-Eastern Region of the Victorian Railways' network was defined as all stations on the Down (north) side of Somerton. This was primarily the mainline to Albury and Sydney and the secondary route via Shepparton to Tocumwal, and their branches to Alexandra, Bendigo via Heathcote, Bright, Cobram, Colbinabbin, Cudgewa, Echuca via Kyabram, Girgarre, Katamatite, Mansfield, Oaklands, Peechelba East, Picola, Tatong, Wahgunyah, Whitfield (narrow-gauge) and Yackandandah.

=== Intercapital Daylight ===
The Intercapital Daylight ran between Melbourne and Albury from 1955 to 1962, connecting with a standard-gauge service of the same name operated by the New South Wales Government Railways to Sydney. After the standard-gauge line was extended to Melbourne, the train ran the whole length from Melbourne to Sydney.

=== School Train ===
School train
Overview
- Current operator: Victorian Railways

Technical
- Track gauge: 1,600 mm (5 ft 3 in)

This name was given to various trains around the state at different times, all on rosters explicitly designed to take children in regional areas to and from schools. Some operated with railmotors, others with older passenger carriages such as the PL series.

Between Kyabram and Echuca, the run was operated by a 153 hp Walker railmotor hauling three trailer cars, which was only possible because the line was practically flat. It left Kyabram at 7:37 am each school day and made about 30 stops at both stations and level crossings en route to pick up around 200 students, many of whom left their bicycles unguarded at the pickup point for the day. Students were segregated by gender, and second preference was given to allocating separate carriages for each school. The complete consist had to be sent to Bendigo Workshops for repairs every school holiday period.

=== Southern Aurora ===
The Southern Aurora ran overnight between Melbourne and Sydney from 1962 and 1986. It was jointly operated by the Victorian Railways and the New South Wales Government Railways.

=== Spirit of Progress ===
The Spirit of Progress ran between Melbourne and Albury from 1937 to 1962, connecting with a standard-gauge service to Sydney. After the standard-gauge line was extended to Melbourne, the train ran the whole length from Melbourne to Sydney, acting as a sweeper service to the new premier Southern Aurora service.

=== Sydney/Melbourne Express ===
The Sydney and Melbourne Express trains ran from 1986 to 1993, replacing the Spirit of Progress and the Southern Aurora.

== Eastern region ==
The Eastern Region of the Victorian Railways' network was defined as all stations on the Down (east) side of Dandenong. This included the lines to Gippsland to Orbost and the South Gippsland to Port Albert, and their branches to Briagolong, Coal Creek, Maffra, Mirboo North, Noojee, Outtrim, Strzelecki, Thorpdale, Walhalla (narrow-gauge), Wonthaggi, Woodside and Yallourn.

=== Maryvale Paper Train ===
Maryvale Paper Train
Overview
- Service type: Freight train
- First service: 12 March 1996
- Current operators: V/Line Freight; Freight Victoria; Freight Australia; Pacific National; Qube

Route
- Termini: APM in Maryvale; Dynon Freight Terminal
- Train number: 9471/9472

Technical
- Track gauge: 1,600 mm (5 ft 3 in)
- Operating speed: 80 km/h

After several years of negotiations, V/Line Freight won a contract for the transport of large quantities of containerised paper products from Maryvale, in the Gippsland region, for both Victorian and interstate customers. Trains would be split in the city, with one portion unloaded at Footscray Road and the other at the Dynon terminal; the latter loading was then transferred to National Rail freight trains running to Sydney or Adelaide, as required. The first service ran on 12 March 1996, using VQDW "Jumbo" container flat wagons, each of which could be loaded with two 40 ft containers. The initial contract was worth about $1.6 million per year for five years, with 160,000 tonnes of goods expected to run in the first year (about 800 tonnes per train), of which about two-thirds was domestic and the balance interstate.

In 1999, the contract transferred to Freight Victoria (later Freight Australia), which was purchased by Pacific National in 2004. In 2013, the contract was handed over to Qube, partially because Pacific National was withdrawing most of its Victorian operations. At the time, Australian Paper was transporting less than 300,000 tonnes of freight per year by rail, with the balance by road. To cater for a proposed additional 100,000 tonnes per year of loading, Qube invested in a fleet of 80 ft skeletal flat wagons, some of which were deployed on the Maryvale run.

As of 2019, the most common operation used two of the four locomotives VL353, VL356 & VL360, G512 and G515, hauling the equivalent of around 30 and 40 ft containers on about twenty Jumbo-length wagons.

=== School Train ===
School train
Overview
- Current operator: Victorian Railways

Technical
- Track gauge: 1,600 mm (5 ft 3 in)

This name was given to various trains around the state at different times, all on rosters explicitly designed to take children in the regional areas to and from schools. Some operated with railmotors, others with older passenger carriages such as the PL series.

=== The Gippslander ===
The Gippslander
Overview
- Current operator: Victorian Railways

Technical
- Track gauge: 1,600 mm (5 ft 3 in)

The Gippslander was a named passenger train operated by the Victorian Railways from Melbourne through the Gippsland region to Bairnsdale. Operating along the Gippsland line daily except Sundays, it had buffet car facilities available.

The train was named in 1954 to celebrate the electrification of the main line as far as Traralgon, but 66 years after the passenger service had commenced along the line. The train was originally hauled by an L class electric locomotive from Melbourne to Traralgon, where an R class steam locomotive took over for the journey to Sale, with the final leg to Bairnsdale hauled by a J class steam locomotive. Steam traction on the service was later replaced by T class diesel locomotives.

After the decommissioning of the overhead system in the 1980s, a variety of diesel locomotives could be seen hauling the train. The Gippslander name is still in use today for V/Line intercity services in the line, but no special facilities are provided.

=== The Snow Train ===
The Snow Train
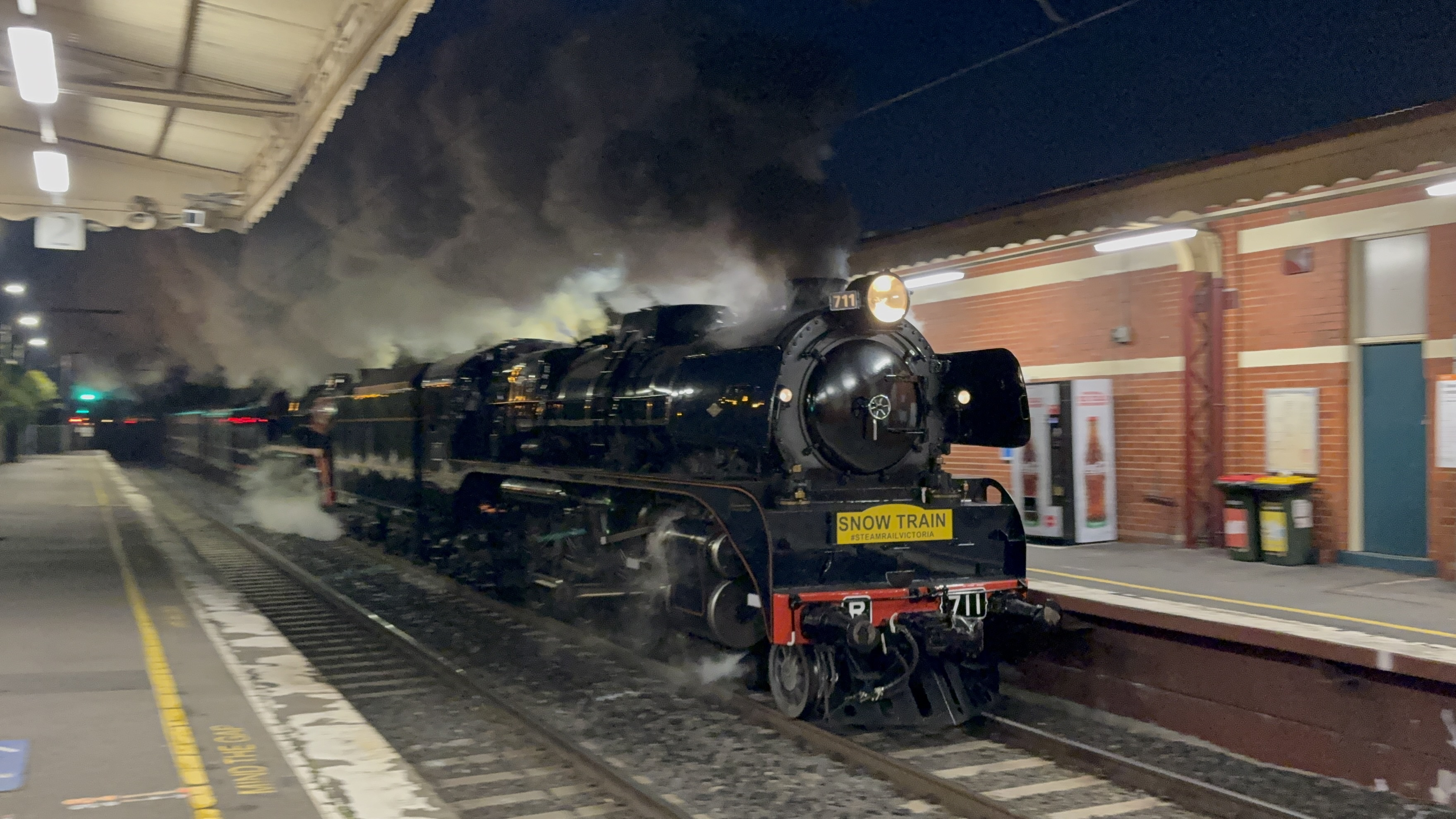

Overview
- Current operator: Steamrail Victoria

Technical
- Track gauge: 1,600 mm (5 ft 3 in)

This train runs yearly from Melbourne to Traralgon, generally using double R class locomotives and hauling 10–14 carriages.

== Excursion trains ==
This section covers a handful of VicRail-era services and the majority of modern-era excursion and themed trips that operate to various destinations without a set route or schedule, and which are not restricted to one of the above regions.

=== Explorer trains ===
Explorer
Overview
- Current operator: Steamrail Victoria

Technical
- Track gauge: 1,600 mm (5 ft 3 in)

The Explorer trains are a range of heritage tours operating from Melbourne along the remaining broad-gauge regional mainlines, providing day or overnight trips using heritage vehicles. Typical examples are the Goulburn Valley Explorer, Northern Explorer, Otway Explorer, and others, generally using similar consists and operating once or twice per year.

=== Food-and-drink experience trains ===
Ale Train; Luncheon Special; Night Train etc.
Overview
- Current operators: Victorian Goldfields Railway; Puffing Billy Railway; Mornington Railway etc.

Technical
- Track gauge: 1,600 mm (5 ft 3 in)

Many of Victoria's preserved railway groups operate dining trains on a regular basis, ranging from annually to daily. Examples include the Ale trains on the Mornington and Victorian Goldfields lines, the Luncheon and Night Train specials on Puffing Billy and the Q Train and Blues Train on the Queenscliff line.

==== Silver Streak ====
The Silver Streak operates from Daylesford station on the first Saturday of each month, using preserved railmotor 40DRC. It offers finger foods, drinks and live music.

=== Melbourne Limited ===
Melbourne Limited

Overview
- Current operator: Steam Age

Technical
- Track gauge: 1,600 mm (5 ft 3 in)

The Melbourne Limited was a steam-hauled luxury train that operated between 1985 and 1987. It used steam locomotive R766 and carriages from the South Australian Railways' steel fleet, refurbished, repainted and named after Victorian lakes.

Michael Wansey and Peter Cleaves of Newcastle, New South Wales had secured funding to revive the already-defunct train, in the form of a A$5,600,000 loan from the Victorian Government, and expected to operate the train in conjunction with the SS South Steyne docked at Station Pier and a Douglas DC-3 aircraft based at Essendon Airport.

=== Murder/Mystery-themed trains ===
Murder on the Orient Express, others.
Overview
- Current operators: Victorian Goldfields Railway; Puffing Billy Railway etc.

Technical
- Track gauge: 1,600 mm (5 ft 3 in)

Many of Victoria's preserved railway groups operate themed murder/mystery specials around late October each year.

=== Southern Cross Express ===
Southern Cross Express

Overview
- Current operator: Australian Vintage Travel

Technical
- Track gauge: 1,600 mm (5 ft 3 in)

The Southern Cross Express was the successor to the above-mentioned Melbourne Limited, which had previously been operated by Steam Age. The carriages were planned for conversion to standard gauge and worked from Melbourne to Sydney, returning via Canberra, with the first trip planned for October 1987. However, one early train ran on the broad gauge from Spencer Street to Swan Hill on 8 August 1987 (returning the following day), with engine R766 and consist Avoca-501-502-707-604-605-713-D337.

=== Weekender trains ===
Weekender
Overview
- Current operator: Steamrail Victoria

Technical
- Track gauge: 1,600 mm (5 ft 3 in)

The Weekender trains are a range of heritage tours operating from Melbourne along the remaining broad gauge regional mainlines, providing full weekend tours departing on Friday nights and returning late Sunday night or occasionally on Monday. One such example is the Maldon Weekender, which operates in conjunction with the Victorian Goldfields Railway and is often used to swap rolling stock between that group and Steamrail Victoria. The consists use sleeping and dining carriages drawn from the pools of various heritage operators. On the weekends between the outbound and return trips the carriages are sometimes used to provide local shuttles, such as between Bendigo and Castlemaine. These trips tend to run once or twice per year.

== Other trains ==
=== Better Farming Train ===
The Better Farming Train was an agricultural demonstration train which toured Victoria, Australia in the 1920s and 1930s to promote better farming practices. It was the first of two agricultural demonstration trains to run in Australia.

=== News Train ===
Newspaper train
Overview
- Service type: Freight train (newspapers)

Route
- Termini: Flinders Street

Technical
- Track gauge: 1,600 mm (5 ft 3 in)
- Operating speed: 80 km/h

These trains departed Flinders Street around midnight each weekday for the regional areas, dropping off freshly-printed newspapers for distribution.

=== Overhead Inspection Train, later Greaser ===
==== Wiring train ====
When Melbourne's railways were first being electrified in 1915 a fleet of at least thirteen H type wooden boxvans were fitted with roofline-level platforms and utilised for installation of overhead electrical wiring to operate the new trains.

Over time individual wagons in the inspection train consist were withdrawn and scrapped, and by the 1950s a replacement set was required to proceed with electrification of the Gippsland railway line. Two new train sets were formed by converting a fleet of (largely, but not exclusively) circa 1890s, obsolete and surplus to requirements, horse wagons, which were then used by contractors to install the wiring on the extended corridor. The OH-classed wagons were numbered in the range 1 to 32.

These vehicles were used through to the 1980s, when they were rendered surplus by new cherry picker-fitted HiRail vehicles that could enter and exit the rail corridor at level crossings, allowing crews allocated to separate tasks to work independently of each other.

The wagons are listed below:

| Prior | OH | To OH | Ex OH | Reason |
|---|---|---|---|---|
| FF 2 | 1 | 14 Mar 1951 | 27 Jun 1956 | Scrapped |
| FF 3 | 2 | 14 Mar 1951 | 10 Dec 1955 | Scrapped |
| FF 4 | 3 | 14 Mar 1951 | 25 Mar 1983 | Sold privately; preserved at Light Horse Museum as at July 1996. |
| FF 5 | 4 | 14 Mar 1951 | 10 Dec 1955 | Scrapped |
| FF 6 | 5 | 14 Mar 1951 | 02 Feb 1956 | Scrapped |
| F 36 | 6 | 14 Mar 1951 | 01 Sep 1983 | Sold privately |
| F 39 | 7 | 14 Mar 1951 | 02 Sep 1983 | Sold privately |
| F 40 | 8 | 14 Mar 1951 | 01 Sep 1983 | Sold privately |
| F 41 | 9 | 14 Mar 1951 | 16 May 1978 | Scrapped |
| F 43 | 10 | 14 Mar 1951 | 26 Sep 1983 | Sold privately |
| F 45 | 11 | 14 Mar 1951 | 10 Aug 1983 | Sold privately |
| F 48 | 12 | 14 Mar 1951 | 14 Sep 1983 | Sold privately |
| F 54 | 13 | 14 Mar 1951 | 14 Aug 1953 | Scrapped |
| F 55 | 14 | 14 Mar 1951 | 16 May 1978 | Scrapped |
| F 62 | 15 | 14 Mar 1951 | 14 Sep 1983 | Sold privately |
| F 58 | 16 | 10 Aug 1953 | 06 Oct 1983 | Sold privately |
| QR 9 | 17 | 02 Apr 1955 | 26 Jan 1957 | Returned to QR 9 |
| IA 12025 | 18 (1st) | c. 1951 | 06 Aug 1975 | Off register, note "Vehicle scrapped. K 109 [flat wagon] to replace it as safety". |
| IA 13118 | 18 (2nd) | 06 Aug 1975 | 13 Mar 1981 | Off register; scrapped 6 days later |
| I 12667 | 19 (1st) | Jun 1955 | Sep 1977 | Converted to K 108 (3rd), flat wagon |
| K 108 (2nd) | 19 (2nd) | Sep 1977 | 22 Aug 1984 | Off register |
| I 9221 | 20 | c. 1955 | 15 May 1980 | Off register |
| I 11109 | 21 | Oct 1955 | 18 Nov 1958 | Scrapped |
| I 8800 | 22 | c. 1952 | 29 Apr 1953 | To HR 153 (1st). Off Register circa 1975 |
| ICI 129 | 23 | Feb 1956 | 18 Nov 1956 | Scrapped |
| (Unknown) | 24 | 1955 | 07 Aug 1959 | To HR 154 (1st). Off Register circa 1984 |
| ICI 128 | 25 | Feb 1956 | 22 Aug 1984 | Off register |
| IA 2277 or K 129 | 26 (1st) | Aug 1955 | 07 Mar 1956 | Off register or scrapped |
| ICI 126 (Note: Sold to ICI as unclassed No.126 in 1941, infer repurchase by Department.) | 26 (2nd) | Feb 1956 | Jun 1978 | Scrapped. Marked "Off Register" about four years later. |
| IA 1191 | 27 | Aug 1955 | Feb 1974 | Off register. Scrapped about six years later. |
| IA 6862 | 28 | Aug 1955 | 18 May 1978 | Scrapped |
| IA 7354 | 29 | Oct 1955 | 02 Oct 1970 | Scrapped |
| U 199 | 30 | Oct 1955 | Feb 1963 | Scrapped |
| I 9814 | 31 | Aug 1956 | 18 Nov 1958 | Scrapped |
| I 8740 | 32 | Aug 1956 | 18 Nov 1958 | Scrapped |

==== Inspection train ====
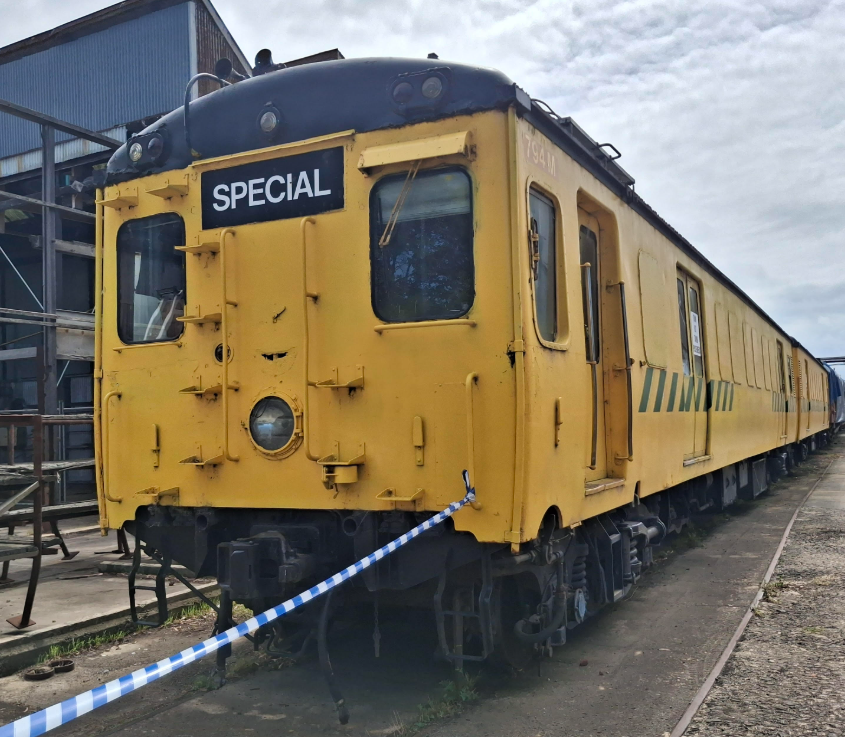
Greaser carriage 794M stored at Newport Workshops

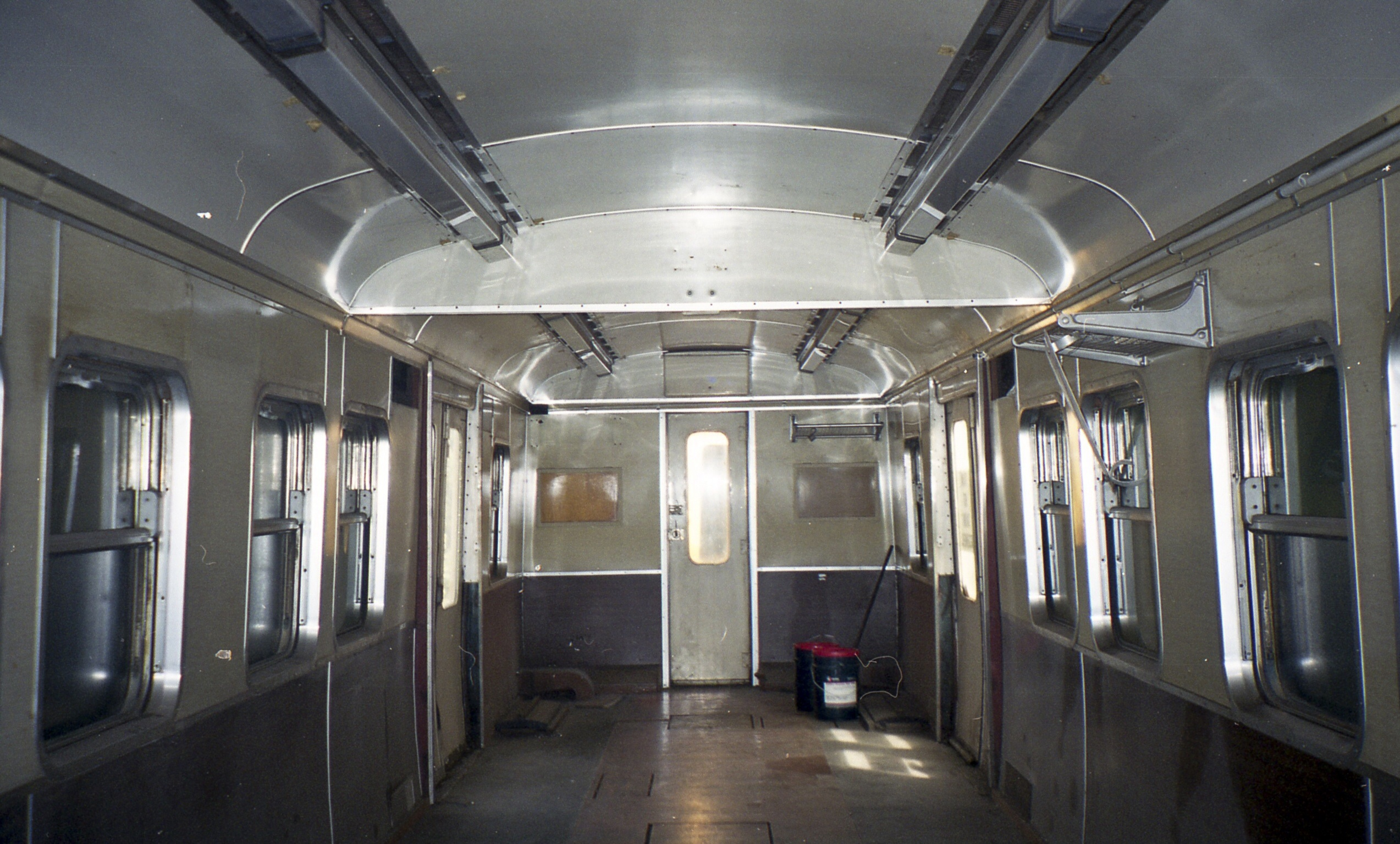
Interior of the Harris 'Greaser' train in 2003

For regular inspection of the network, Parcels Van 3CM was constructed with a cupola in the centre of the roof and a raised observation platform, to allow maintenance staff to observe overhead wiring under load and without disrupting services. It was also involved in inspection of new overhead wiring extensions, such as the Gippsland line electrification in the early 1950s.

In 1961 3CM was damaged, so its sibling 10CM, a converted Swing door parcels van which had been in passenger service until 1955, was fitted with similar equipment and entered service as a second inspection car around July 1961; the design was slightly modified in the following year. The sides were completely stripped and replaced with a similar style to that of the Tait parcel van fleet, though the car maintained its thinner body of 8 ft 6 in (2.59 m). Outward-swinging doors were kept, in three pairs, at spacings which divided the car into four roughly equal sections, although the outer two were partially driver's compartments. The guard facility at the raised-roof/pantograph end was retained. When complete, 10CM was painted in blue with a thick yellow stripe along the sides, curving to a point in the middle of the ends. The number and code was adjacent to the outer sets of doors and, on either side of the middle door, there was advertising for the Victorian Railways' parcel services, identical to the Tait design.

When 3CM was repaired in 1963 it was fitted with an experimental Faivley pantograph. 10CM was involved in a collision in early 1967 and was awaiting scrapping, but it was instead returned to service and fitted with new bogies and a lightweight pantograph.

Inspection trains would often run with two randomly selected Tait or Swing Door motor carriages, one either side of the inspection car which would have its own pantographs locked down.

==== Greasing train ====
Originally, grease had been applied to the rails at sharp curves and other locations by track maintenance staff on an as-required basis, to reduce wear on wheel flanges and rails. By the 1980s mechanised track maintenance methods had reduced the number of track "gangers" required and available, and this required some other solution to apply the grease.

On 6 October 1980, Tait carriage 447M had a similar raised cupola fitting added, and it was renamed the Greasing Car. It was painted bright yellow with most windows boarded over, had its traction motors removed, and large black letters declaring "OVERHEAD INSPECTION" were painted on both sides. Internally the car was fitted with a power generator and hydraulic equipment to lubricate the overhead wiring, so it combined the three functions of rail greasing, overhead lubrication and inspection duties. The car was renumbered 1447M in 1983, and after a graffiti attack around 1995 it was painted all-over yellow (sans lettering).

The train operated on an as-required basis through the 1980s, but this became more challenging as the wooden motor carriage fleet was depleted. It had originally been worked by 456M and 461M, but these were withdrawn in 1985 when one of the two became defective and replaced with double-ended Tait motors 1470M and 1471M. The two Tait motors were withdrawn following a final trip to Traralgon on 3 February 1987, the next trip being worked by Harris motor cars 794M and 797M, still painted in their blue livery. 774M and 778M, both with asbestos components removed, were used in trials during the week of 15–21 February 1987 as motor units working 1447M, the latter having had its screw couplings replaced with a centre drawbar that was supposed to be compatible with the Harris cars. However, these tests failed and the Tait motors 1470M and 1471M were recalled to active duty pending a rethink.

In August 1987, the three-car Tait set was referred to in Newsrail as the Overhead Lubrication Train and had been fitted with rail greasing equipment to reduce excessive wear on Comeng wheelsets. It made its first trip through the City Loop in the last week of May 1987.

Eventually MetRail acquired Matisa 698 from V/Line, a diesel-powered track machine that applied grease to the inside of tight curves as it passed them, supplementing the work of 1447M. It was reclassified as "6.52.002 Rail Greaser Vehicle, MTA", though it still had faded V/Line logos when first sighted.

In 1989 two final generation, withdrawn, asbestos-free Harris cars, 794M and 797M, were removed from service as transfer vehicles to dispose of old rolling stock, and taken to Newport Workshops for fitting out as new Greaser motor units. The two cars were sighted undergoing conversion and repainting on 2 November 1989, but had not yet entered service by 11 November. Between the withdrawal of 1470M and 1471M at the end of March 1990, and the introduction to service of 794M and 797M, a pair of Y class locomotives were used to haul the train set around, with one at each end. The consist was sighted as, from east end, Y130-D329-1447M-320D-Y166, on both 21 March and 2 April 1990. This would have avoided the need to run around the train at termini. 1470M was allocated to Elecrail, and 1471M to the Newport Railway Museum.

The new Greaser train operated with 1447M in the middle and used withdrawn V/Line parcels vans to transition between automatic and screw couplers, with the complete consist of 797M-320D-1447M-329D-794M. The two Harris cars were fitted with rail greasing equipment for tight curves, and the five-piece train made regular runs around the electrified network. While 1447M was in all-over yellow and the two Harris cars in similar livery but with green/yellow Met stickers along the sides, the two D vans were in normal V/Line orange livery; the only alteration was the fitting of screw couplers at one end each to allow coupling to the Tait carriage.

In circa 1994, pantographs on the suburban trains were upgraded with carbon skid plates rather than steel, removing the need to apply grease to the overhead power lines as the carbon reduced wear on the overhead lines. 1447M and the two D vans were removed from overhead greasing service and the two Harris motors ran back-to-back as solely rail greasers. The two Harris motors were subsequently fitted with the upgraded pantographs and ran in rail greaser service until suffering a major breakdown in 2003. In later years the Greaser train was withdrawn, and now small automatic greasing pots are attached to the rails at tight curves. 1447M remained stored at Newport Workshops until 2008, when it was scrapped along with other rolling stock during the clean out of the Newport Rotten Road. Both 797M & 794M remain stored at Newport Workshops.

Overhead and rail inspection is now done using car IEV102 hauled by two T or P class diesel locomotives, or dedicated maintenance vehicle "Evie".

=== Puffing Billy ===
The name Puffing Billy, while now used primarily to refer to the Belgrave to Gembrook tourist line, was originally used to describe the narrow gauge ^{N}A class locomotives running on all four of Victoria's narrow gauge railways.

=== RESO Train ===
RESO Train
Overview
- Current operator: Victorian Railways

Technical
- Track gauge: 1,600 mm (5 ft 3 in)

The Reso Train, officially the State Resources Train, was a train operated by the Victorian Railways to bring business leaders from Melbourne and regional Victoria together. The concept was promoted by Harold Clapp, Chairman of Commissioners of the Victorian Railways with the city leaders travelling on the train to various parts of the state. It was complemented by the Better Farming Train from 1924. The first train ran to Swan Hill and Mildura in August 1922.

A typical consist in 1934 when the train was making its 22nd journey, accommodated 60 passengers with the train made up of a parlor car, three sleeping carriages, a dining car, an office car, a staff car and a van. It ceased with the outbreak of World War II, before resuming in May 1947.

The train was described in the August 1954 Victorian Railways News Letter as having four or five sleeping cars, plus an unidentified 42-seater dining car, the original Norman, the first Carey, Goulburn and possibly a brake van.

A typical itinerary is demonstrated by the train's 53rd journey in March 1959, where it left Melbourne on a five-day journey with the passengers visiting the Hume Weir, Rutherglen Research Station, Mount Buffalo National Park, Kiewa Hydroelectric Scheme and the rayon and wool industries of Wangaratta.

=== The Medical Train ===
The Medical Train
Overview
- Current operator: Victorian Railways

Technical
- Track gauge: 1,600 mm (5 ft 3 in)

This train ran around the state on a semi-regular schedule, with a travelling doctor who provided checkups for railway employees at isolated locations. In addition to living quarters and normal doctor facilities the carriage included a black, 26 ft long corridor with red, yellow and green lights at the far end which was used to test for colour and distance sighting.

=== The Weedex and Fire Attack trains ===
The Weedex Train
Overview
- Current operator: Victorian Railways

Technical
- Track gauge: 1,600 mm (5 ft 3 in)

This train ran around the state each year spraying weed-killer along the trackside. This was done to prevent growth of weeds which could later dry out and become a fire hazard.

During the fire season some of the train vehicles could be mobilised to form a consist that could spray water lineside, although this was rarely used.
