= Melbourne-Brighton Bus Lines =

- Parent: Bail family
- Founded: 1954
- Ceased operation: November 1992
- Locale: South-east Melbourne
- Service type: Bus & coach operator
- Depots: Port Melbourne
- Fleet: 43 (April 1985)

Melbourne-Brighton Bus Lines was an Australian bus and coach operator in Melbourne.

== History ==
Melbourne-Brighton Bus Lines was formed in 1954 by the combination of a number of operators who served route 1 Gardenvale to Melbourne central business district and route 2 Middle Brighton to Melbourne City Centre. A depot was established in Brighton to house the 24-vehicle fleet.

In September 1958, route 140A, Middle Brighton to St Kilda station, was purchased from Eastern Suburbs Omnibus Service. In 1959, the depot was relocated to Elwood. In 1971, routes 140A, 1 and 2 were renumbered 600–602. Short journeys to Beach Avenue and Head Street were renumbered 603 and 604.

In March 1979, the Denning service agency and spare parts agency was added. A coach operation was founded under the Melbright Coaches brand. In April 1985, the route operations were sold to the Metropolitan Transit Authority, along with 37 buses.

The Melbright Coaches operation was retained, moving to Port Melbourne. Melbright Coaches ceased operating in November 1992 after it was unable to recover debts from Austral Denning, following the latter being placed in receivership. The licences were sold to the Driver Group.

== Fleet ==
The initial fleet consisted of Bedfords, Daimlers, Internationals, Leylands and Reos. From 1961, the company purchased heavy-duty Leyland buses, and Denning coaches for its charter operations. At the time of the sale of the route-bus services in April 1985, the fleet consisted of 43 buses and coaches.

In 2012, Bayside Coaches restored a Denning Landseer into Melbright Coaches livery.
