= Norman Charles Harris =

Norman Charles Harris CMG DSO MC
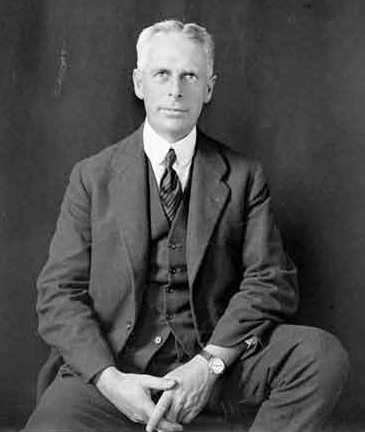
- Official Victorian Railways portrait, c. 1928

Chairman of Commissioners of the Victorian Railways
- In office 1940–1950
- Preceded by: Harold Winthrop Clapp
- Succeeded by: Robert Wishart

Personal details
- Born: 10 April 1887 Moonee Ponds, Victoria
- Died: 3 May 1963 (aged 76) Brighton, Victoria
- Education: McGill University (MSc)
- Occupation: Engineer
- Civilian awards: Companion of the Order of St Michael and St George

Military service
- Allegiance: Australia
- Branch/service: Citizen Military Forces; Australian Imperial Force
- Years of service: 1912–1928
- Rank: Lieutenant Colonel
- Battles/wars: First World War
- Military awards: Distinguished Service Order; Military Cross; Mentioned in Despatches (2)

Norman Charles Harris, CMG, DSO, MC (10 April 1887 – 3 May 1963) was an Australian railways administrator and decorated First World War army engineer who served as the chairman of Commissioners of the Victorian Railways from 1940 until 1950.

== Career ==
Harris attended Scotch College, Melbourne, and studied engineering at McGill University in Montreal. He worked for the Canadian Pacific Railway followed by the Hydro-Electric Power Co. in Tasmania and in 1913 became a draftsman for the Victoria Railways and then joining his father in the rolling stock division.

During the First World War, Harris served on the Western Front with the 2nd Divisional Engineers. He organised trench improvements and the construction of four bridges over the River Ancre near Albert, Somme. He was awarded the Military Cross and a Distinguished Service Order. After the war, he spent some time in England, studying their railway system.

Returning to Melbourne in 1919, he became Assistant Chief Mechanical Engineer in 1922, Chief Mechanical Engineer in 1928, a Commissioner in 1933, and Chairman of Commissioners in 1940.

The blue Melbourne Suburban Electric Harris trains were named after him in 1956.
