= Victorian Railways =

Former state-owned rail company in Victoria, Australia

- Logo used from 1952 to 1981

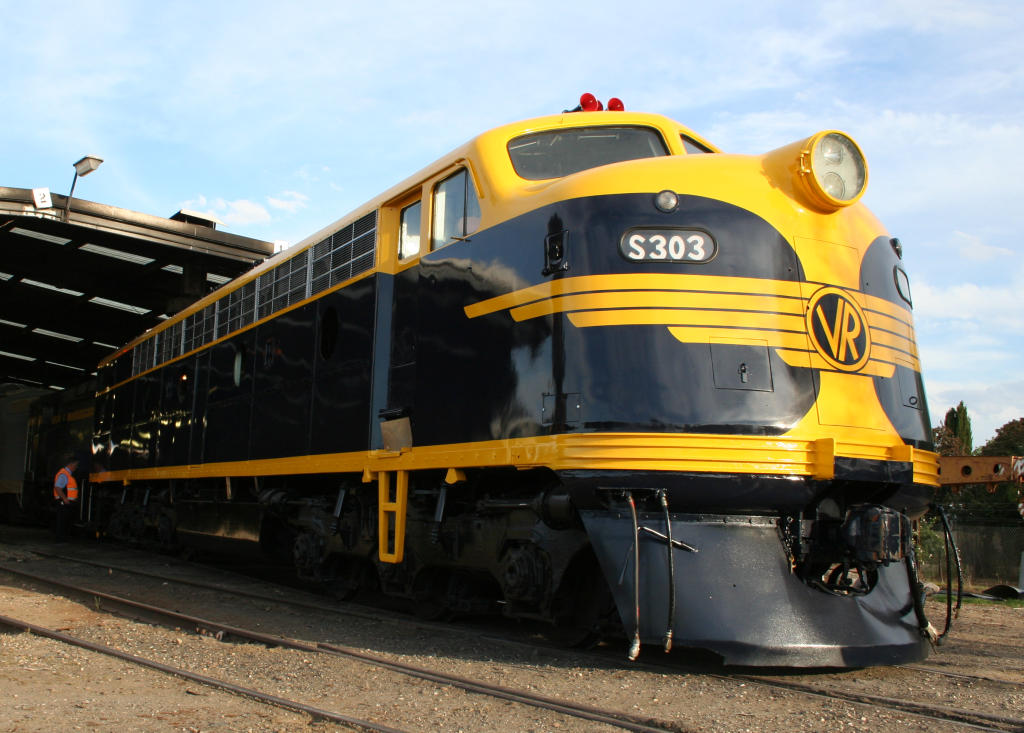
- Preserved S303 in Victorian Railways blue and gold livery in Seymour, Victoria
- Trade name: VicRail (1974–83)
- Type: State-owned enterprise
- Predecessor: Department of Railways
- Founded: 1859; 167 years ago
- Defunct: 1 July 1983; 43 years ago
- Fate: Split into MTA and STA, then MTA was merged into MMTB to form The Met.
- Successor: Metropolitan Transit Authority; V/Line
- Headquarters: 67 Spencer Street, Melbourne
- Area served: Victoria
- Parent: Victorian Railways Commissioners (1883–1973); Victorian Railways Board (1973–83)

The Victorian Railways (VR), trading from 1974 as VicRail, was the state-owned operator of most rail transport in the Australian state of Victoria from 1859 to 1983. The first railways in Victoria were private companies, but when these companies failed or defaulted, the Victorian Railways was established to take over their operations. Most of the lines operated by the Victorian Railways were of 5 ft 3 in (1,600 mm). However, the railways also operated up to five 2 ft 6 in (762 mm) narrow gauge lines between 1898 and 1962, and a 4 ft 8 1/2 in (1,435 mm) standard gauge line between Albury and Melbourne from 1961.

== History ==
=== Formation ===
A Department of Railways was created in 1856 with the first appointment of staff. British engineer, George Christian Darbyshire was made first Engineer-in-Chief in 1857, and steered all railway construction work until his replacement by Thomas Higinbotham in 1860. In late 1876, New York consulting engineer Walton Evans arranged the supply of two 4-4-0 locomotives manufactured by the Rogers Locomotive Works of New Jersey, US to the Victorian Railways.

Because of political turmoil in the Victorian Government, Higginbotham was one of 137 officials removed from office on Black Wednesday on 8 January 1878 when the Government was denied supply. He, like a number of other senior officers, was not reappointed. Robert Watson then took over as Engineer-in-Chief. But in 1880, a new Ministry expressed a wish to redress the injustice by re-instating Higginbotham. However, at the sudden death of Higginbotham in 1880, William Elsdon took over for two years before his retirement in 1882, and Watson then returned to his former position as Engineer-in-Chief, which he held up to the time of his death.

On 1 November 1883, assent was given to the Victorian Railways Commissioners Act 1883 (47 Vict. No. 767), to construct, maintain and manage the state's railways. The staff of the Department of Railways came under the authority of the Victorian Railway Commissioners, which became commonly known as Victorian Railways. The elaborate headquarters at 67 Spencer Street were opened in 1893.

=== Growth ===
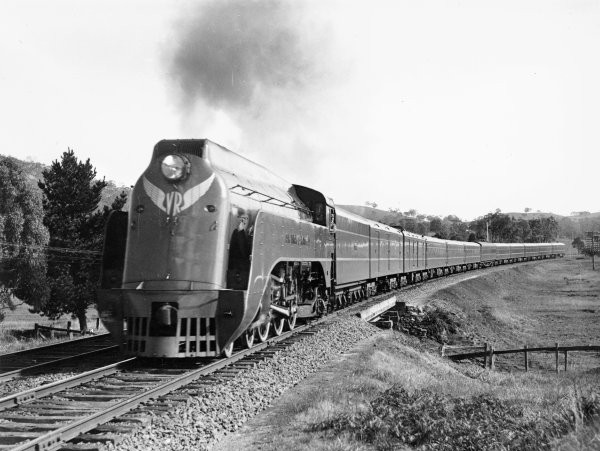
The Spirit of Progress headed by S301 Sir Thomas Mitchell near Kilmore East in 1938

Head office at 67 Spencer Street

Victorian Railways grew to service all parts of the state, even extending some lines into New South Wales under the Border Railways Act 1922. In the late 19th century, the railways became something of a political football with politicians demanding new lines to be built in places where traffic levels never justified it. In 1864, there was just 254 miles (409 km) of railway. The system expanded rapidly to reach 2,900 route miles (4,670 km) by 1891 and to its greatest extent of 4,755 route miles (7652 km) in 1939. The result was that by the beginning of the 20th century, no Victorian (apart from those in the mountain regions) was more than 25 miles (42 km) from a railway line. The period from the end of the 1930s saw a slow decline in route mileage as unprofitable branches were closed.

Conversion of the Melbourne suburban system to electric operation commenced in 1919 and was completed by 1930, creating what was claimed at the time to be the world's largest electric suburban rail system. 1937 saw the introduction of the streamlined Spirit of Progress passenger train, with air conditioning and all steel carriage construction. Diesel power was introduced in 1951 with ten F-class diesel-electric shunting locomotives, followed by B-class mainline diesel-electric locomotives in 1952/53. A standard gauge line connecting to the New South Wales system was constructed in 1961 allowing through trains to operate between Melbourne and Sydney, Australia's two largest cities, for the first time. The last steam locomotive was withdrawn in 1972.

=== Demise ===
In May 1973, the Railways (Amendment) Act 1972 (No. 8353) passed the management of the railways from the Victorian Railways Commissioners to a Victorian Railways Board. In 1974, the Victorian Railways was rebranded as VicRail, but the royal blue and gold livery used on rolling stock was retained until 1981.

In 1983, VicRail was divided by the Transport Act 1983 (No. 9921) into two—the State Transport Authority taking responsibility for the provision of country rail and road, passenger and freight services, and the Metropolitan Transit Authority taking over suburban passenger operations.

The State Transport Authority traded under the V/Line name, while the Metropolitan Transit Authority used that name until the Public Transport Corporation ("The Met") was formed in 1989. Between 1996 and 1999, V/Line and The Met were privatised. V/Line Passenger was franchised to National Express, returning to government ownership in 2002. The V/Line Freight division was sold to Freight Victoria and is now owned by Pacific National. The infrastructure is now managed by VicTrack with the interstate rail freight infrastructure leased to the Australian Rail Track Corporation. Metro Trains Melbourne now operates the suburban railway network.

== Management ==
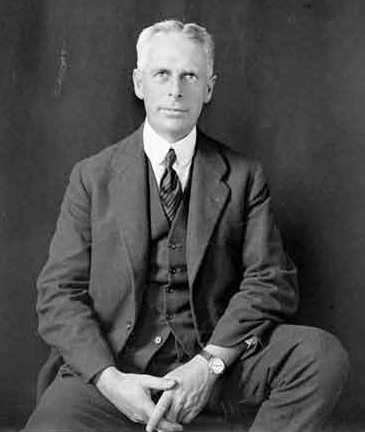
Norman Charles Harris

When first formed in 1857, the management of the Railways Department was initially vested in the President of the Board of Land and Works, this situation remaining until 1884. With the passing of the Victorian Railways Commissioners Act 1883, a board of four commissioners was put in charge, responsible to the Minister of Railways (the Minister of Transport from 1935 onwards).

The Chairman of Commissioners of the Victorian Railways were:

- Richard Speight: 1883 to 1892
- Richard Hodge Francis: 1892 to 1894
- James Syder: 1894 to 1896
- John Mathieson: 1896 to 1901
- William Francis Joseph Fitzpatrick: 1901 to 1903
- Thomas James Tait: 1903 to 1910
- William Francis Joseph Fitzpatrick: 1910 to 1915
- Charles Ernest Norman: 1915 to 1920
- Harold Winthrop Clapp: 1920 to 1939
- Norman Charles Harris: 1940 to 1950
- Robert George Wishart: 1950 to 1955
- Edgar Henry Brownbill: 1956 to 1967
- George Frederick Brown: 1967 to 1973

After the Bland Report of 1972, in May 1973 the Railways (Amendment) Act 1972 passed the management of the Railways from the Victorian Railways Commissioners to a Victorian Railways Board. The board could have up to seven members, with six being initially appointed. This remained until 1983 when the board was discontinued under the Transport Act 1983.

== Fleet ==
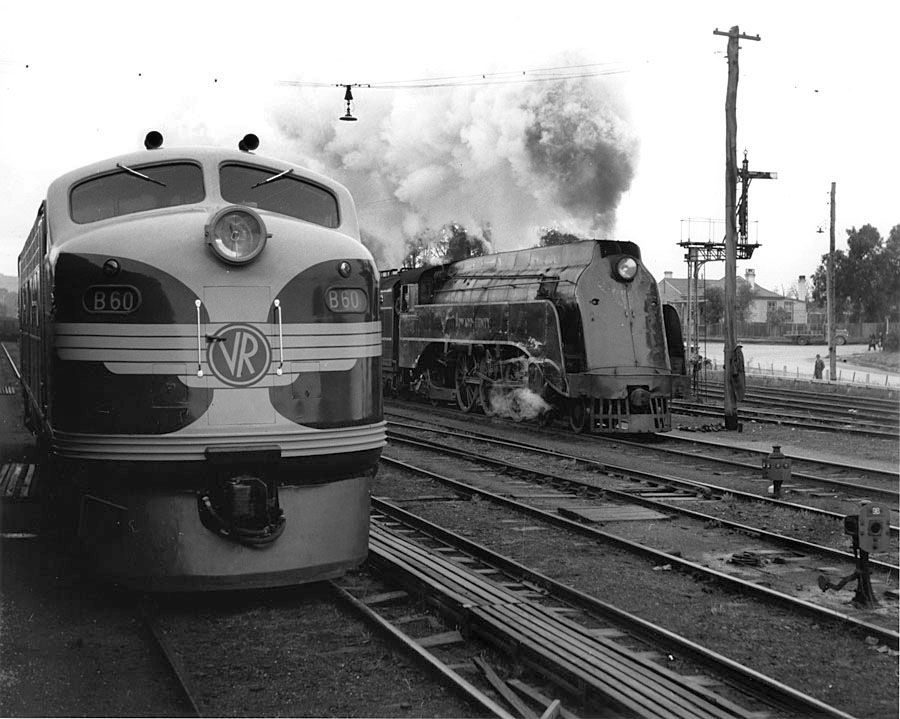
First generation diesel locomotive B60 beside one of the S class steam locomotives it replaced at Seymour in July 1952

The Victorian Railways operated a wide variety of locomotives and rolling stock to provide passenger and goods services. This included equipment acquired from the private companies that built the first railways in Victoria. The majority of the fleet was broad gauge, with a specialised fleet used on the narrow gauge lines. In later years, gauge conversion was used to place stock from the main VR fleet onto standard gauge.

In 1936, the company owned 590 locomotives, 38 railcars, 819 coaches, 716 brake vans and 20,945 goods wagons.

The first locomotives used in the state were small steam locomotives, the majority being imported from the United Kingdom, with later years seeing larger units being built locally. Electric locomotives were acquired with the electrification of the suburban railways, with more powerful units acquired when the mainline to Traralgon was electrified. Dieselisation occurred from 1951, but the B class of 1952 revolutionised main line operations. Apart from the F class shunters, Clyde Engineering had a monopoly on Victorian diesel-electric locomotives, as the Australian licensee of General Motors EMD engines and traction motors, fitting them into locally designed bodies.

Early passenger services were operated with 4 and 6 wheeled "dogbox" passenger carriages, but larger bogie rollingstock started to appear from the turn of the century. On the Melbourne suburban network electric multiple units were introduced speeding up services. Experiments were also made with various diesel and petrol railcars for use on smaller branch lines. By the late 1970s, country passenger services were run down, and older wooden rolling stock was now approaching their use by date. As a result, the New Deal saw modern steel carriages introduced from 1981.

Early wagons were built on four wheeled under frames, but from 1871 bogie vehicles begun to appear. The last four wheeled open wagons were built in 1958, but were not scrapped in large numbers until the 1980s when new bogie wagons replaced them. By 1987, the bogie wagon fleet numbered 5000.

When the Victorian Railways (now known as VicRail) was divided into two in 1983, the Metropolitan Transit Authority received the suburban electric multiple unit fleet, while the State Transport Authority took responsibility for remainder for the provision of country passenger and freight services.

== Rolling stock ==
=== Railcars ===
Class	Image	Type	Gauge	Top speed (km/h)	Built	Number	In service	Notes
Rowan		Steam	Broad		1883–1888	2	1883–1904	
Kerr Stuart		Steam	Broad		1912	1	1913–1924	
McKeen		Petrol	Broad		1911	2	1912–1919	Converted to passenger carriage
AEC		Petrol	Broad		1922–1925	19	1922–1956	
Leyland		Petrol	Broad		1925–1926	4	1925–1954	
Brill		Petrol	Broad		1928	1	1928–1947	
Petrol Electric Railmotor (PERM) / Diesel Electric Railmotor (DERM)		Petrol later Diesel	Broad	100	1928–1931	10	1928–1991	Converted from Petrol to Diesel Electric Railmotors
Kerang Tramway Railmotor		Petrol	Broad		1943	1	1952–1958	First entered service on the Kerang–Koondrook Tramway
102hp Walker		Diesel	Broad	70	1948–1955	12 railmotors 1 power unit	1948–1978	
153hp Walker		Diesel	Broad	80	1948–1954	15 railmotors 1 power unit	1948–1981	
280hp Walker		Diesel	Broad	95	1950–1954	12 railmotors 1 power unit	1950–1980	
Diesel Rail Car (DRC)		Diesel	Broad	115	1971–1973	4	1971–1994	

=== Locomotives (diesel/electric) ===
Class	Image	Type	Gauge	Top speed (km/h)	Built	Number	In service	Notes
B		Diesel-electric	Broad	133	1952–1953	26	1952–1982	
C		Diesel-electric	Broad, standard	133	1977–1978	10	1977–1995	
F		Diesel-electric	Broad	32	1951–1953	16	1951–1987	
H		Diesel-electric	Broad	100	1968–1969	5	1968–1999	
S		Diesel-electric	Broad, standard	133	1957–1961	18	1957–1961	
T		Diesel-electric	Broad, standard	100	1955–1968	94	1955-2000	
X		Diesel-electric	Broad, standard	133	1966, 1970, 1975–1976	24	1966–1999	
Y		Diesel-electric	Broad	65	1963–1968	75	1963-present	
M		Diesel-hydraulic	Broad	20	1959	2	1959-?	
V		Diesel-hydraulic	Broad	16	1959	1	1959-?	
W		Diesel-hydraulic	Broad	32	1959–1961	27	1959–1982	
E		Electric	Broad	65	1923, 1928–1929	12	1923–1984	
L		Electric	Broad	121	1953–1954	25	1953–1987	

=== Locomotives (steam) ===
Class	Image	Type	Gauge	Top speed (km/h)	Built	Number	In service	Notes
No.1 (1857)		2-2-2 later 2-4-0	Broad		1857	1	1858–1904	Later rebuilt as 2-4-0
No.100 (1871)		2-4-0	Broad		1872	1	1872–1916	Allocated as Class E in 1886, became unclassed again in 1889. Commissioners locomotive
No.103 & 105 (1873)		0-6-0	Broad		1873	2	1874–1924	
Old A (1884)		4-4-0	Broad		1884	10	1884–1924	First entered service as Unclassed
New A (1889)		4-4-0	Broad		1889–1891	15	1889–1925	
A^{A} (1900)		4-4-0	Broad		1900–1903	20	1900–1932	
A^{2} (1907)		4-6-0	Broad	115	1907–1922	185	1907–1963	Ran the Geelong Flier, reducing times from Geelong to Melbourne to 63, and then 55 minutes
B (1861)		2-4-0	Broad		1861–1880	34	1862–1917	First entered service as Unclassed
C (1878)		4-4-0WT	Broad		1871–1883	26	1878–1916	6 first entered service with Melbourne and Hobson's Bay United Railway Company (1871–1878). All first entered service as Unclassed
C (1918)		2-8-0	Broad	96	1918–1926	26	1918–1962	Ran during the war on the North Eastern, Ballarat, Bendigo, and Geelong lines
D (1876)		4-4-0	Broad		1876	2	1877–1907	First entered service as Unclassed. Class also known as "Rodgers". Named Neil and Neil's Sister
D (1887)		4-4-0	Broad		1887–1888	20	1887–1928	
D^{D} (1902)		4-6-0	Broad	120 (95 in service)	1902–1916	261	1902–1974	Class split in 1922: D^{1} class comprising all the original saturated steam locomotives; D^{2} class comprising all the superheated steam locomotives; In 1929, D^{3} class comprising larger boilers
$\mathrm{D^D_E}$ (1908)		4-6-2T	Broad		1908–1913	58	1908–1962	Reclassified as D^{4} class in 1929
E (1888)		2-4-2T later 0-6-2T	Broad		1888–1894	76	1989–1966	0-6-2T were known as E^{E} until 1929
F (1874)		2-4-0 later 2-4-2T	Broad		1874–1880	21	1874–1929	First entered service as Unclassed. Seven converted to 2-4-2T for motor service from 1910
G (1877)		4-4-0	Broad		1877	2	1877–1904	First entered service as Unclassed
G (1925)		2-6-0+0-6-2	Narrow		1925	2	1926–1964	
H (1877)		4-4-0	Broad		1877–1878	8	1877–1916	First entered service as Unclassed
H (1941)		4-8-4	Broad	88.5	1941	1	1941–1958	Nicknamed Heavy Harry; largest locomotive ever built in Australia
J (1859)		2-2-2 later 2-4-0	Broad		1859	5	1860–1912	First entered service as Unclassed. Later rebuilt as 2-4-0
J (1954)		2-8-0	Broad	80	1954	60	1954–1972	J550 last steam locomotive in normal revenue service on Victorian Railways
K (1874)		2-4-0	Broad		1874	6	1874–1905	First entered service as Unclassed
K (1922)		2-8-0	Broad	80	1922–1946	53	1922–1982	K162 last steam locomotive in service on Victorian Railways
L (1859)		2-4-0ST	Broad		1854–1871	10	1861–1906	First entered service as Unclassed
M (1879)		4-4-0T later 4-4-2T	Broad		1879–1886	22	1880–1922	First entered service as Unclassed. 4-4-2T were known as M^{E} class
N (1878)		2-4-0WT	Broad		1854–1871	9	1878–1906	First entered service as Unclassed with various private companies (1854–1878)
N (1925)		2-8-2	Broad		1925–1951	83	1925–1966	Designed for conversion to standard gauge
NA (1898)		2-6-2T	Narrow	32(8 in service)	1898–1915	17	1898–1962	
O (1861)		0-6-0	Broad		1861–1881	44	1862–1922	First entered service as Unclassed
P (1859)	.	0-6-0	Broad		1859	5	1860–1921	First entered service as Unclassed
Q (1873)	Q class locomotive	0-6-0	Broad		1873–1874	10	1873–1908	First entered service as Unclassed
Old R (1879)		0-6-0	Broad		1879–1892	59	1879–1944	First entered service as Unclassed
'Belgian' R (1883)		0-6-0	Broad		1883	5	1883–1920	First entered service as Unclassed
New R (1889)		0-6-0	Broad		1889–1891	25	1889–1966	Those with new boilers were known as RY
R (1951)		4-6-4	Broad	112	1951–1952	70	1951–1974	All were broad gauge under the Victorian Railways. One has been converted to standard gauge in preservation
S (1882)		4-6-0	Broad		1882–1883	10	1882–1926	First entered service as Unclassed
S (1928)		4-6-2	Broad	128(80 in service)	1928	4	1928–1954	
T (1874)		0-6-0	Broad		1874–1885	23	1847–1953	Four from Deniliquin and Moama Railway Company. First entered service as Unclassed
U (1874)		0-6-0	Broad		1874	9	1874–1908	First entered service as Unclassed
V (1857)		0-6-0	Broad		1857	4	1858–1904	First entered service as Unclassed
V (1899)		2-8-0	Broad		1899–1902	16	1900–1930	
W (1880)		4-6-0	Broad		1880–1883	12	1880–1926	First entered service as Unclassed
X (1886)		0-6-0	Broad		1886–1887	15	1886–1920	
X (1929)		2-8-2	Broad	80	1929–1947	29	1929–1960	
Y (1885)		0-6-0	Broad	65	1885–1889	49	1885–1963	First entered service as Unclassed
Z (1893)		2-4-0T	Broad		1893	2	1893–1911	Had their full length covered in with an extended cab in the style of a road tramway motor
Z (1893)		0-6-0T	Broad		1893	1	1893–1903	Rebuilt as No. 3 Steam Crane (known as Polly)

=== Carriage stock ===
Class	Image	Type	Gauge	Top speed (km/h)	Built	Number	In service	Notes
AEC trailers		Railmotor Trailer	Broad		1922–1928	24	1922–1957	
Brill trailer		Railmotor Trailer	Broad		1928	1	1928–1983	
DERM Trailer		Railmotor Trailer	Broad		1930	5	1930–1982	
Walker Trailer		Railmotor Trailer	Broad		1948–1954	15	1948–1983	
Misc trailers		Railmotor Trailer	Broad		1928–1981	8	1928–1984	
Fixed-wheel cars		Wooden Passenger Carriage	Broad		1855–1951	~1654	1855–c. 1983	
Early Bogie cars		Wooden Passenger Carriage	Broad		1874–1945	?	1874–c. 1983	Converted into Swing Door suburban electrics
V cars		Wooden Passenger Carriage	Broad		1897–1906	67	1897–1983	Vestibule cars
C & L cars		Wooden Passenger Carriage	Broad		1899–1921	C: 71; L: 82	1899–c. 1983	Corridor cars with lavatory. C reclass L in 1910
E cars		Wooden Passenger Carriage	Broad		1906–1955	175	1906–1994	Express cars
P cars		Wooden Passenger Carriage	Broad		1910–1917	310	Passageway cars. Converted into Tait suburban electrics	
PL cars		Wooden Passenger Carriage	Broad		1918–1921	141	1917–1988	Passageway cars with lavatory
Short W & U cars		Wooden Passenger Carriage	Broad, standard		1911–1925	136	1911–1984	Wayside cars
Long W cars		Wooden Passenger Carriage	Broad, standard		1926–1927	25	1926–1986	Wayside cars
G cars		Wooden Passenger Carriage	Broad		1961	2	1961–1983	
S cars		Steel Passenger Carriage	Broad, standard	115	1937–1956	39	1937-2010	
Z cars		Steel Passenger Carriage	Broad, standard	115	1957–1966	27	1957-present	
N cars		Steel Passenger Carriage	Broad, standard	115	1981–1984	57	1981-present	

=== Electric multiple units ===
Class	Image	Type	Gauge	Top speed (km/h)	Built	Number	In service	Notes
Swing Door		Electric	Broad	80	1917–1924	288	1917–1974	Converted from steam-hauled carriages built 1887–1893. Commonly known as "Dogboxes"
Tait		Electric	Broad	110	1916–1952	618	1916–1985	Converted from steam-hauled carriages built 1910–1917. Commonly known as "Red Rattlers"
Harris		Electric	Broad	130	1956–1971	436	1956–1988	Some converted to Refurbished Harris some to H set carriages. Commonly known as "Blue Trains"
Hitachi		Electric	Broad	116	1972–1981	355	1972–2014	Commonly known as "Silver Trains"
Comeng		Electric	Broad	115	1981–1988	570	1981-present	
Refurbished Harris		Electric	Broad	130	1982–1983	16	1982–1992	Converted to H set carriages. Commonly known as "Grey Ghosts"

== Operational branches ==
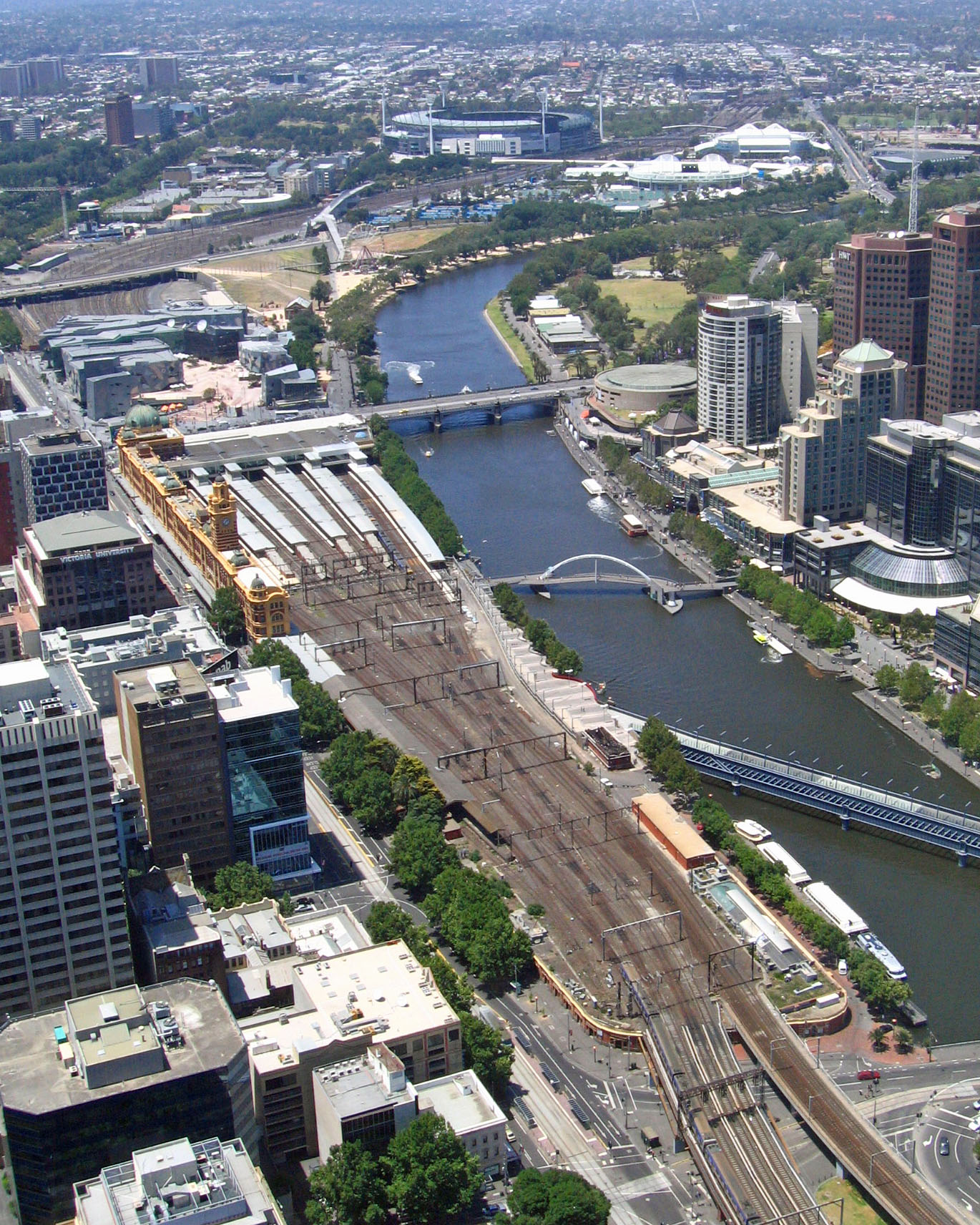
Western approach to Flinders Street station

The Victorian Railways was divided up into a number of branches, each with a set of responsibilities. These branches were reorganised a number of times, in 1962 they were:

- Secretaries: headed by the Secretary for Railways, dealt with policy, administration, transport regulation and legal matters.
- Rolling Stock: headed by the Chief Mechanical Engineer, was responsible for design, construction, operation, and maintenance of all locomotives and rolling stock.
- Way and Works: headed by the Chief Civil Engineer, it constructed and maintained all fixed infrastructure such as track, bridges, stations, signalling and safeworking.
- Traffic: headed by the Chief Traffic Manager, it operated all goods and passenger services both on rail and road.
- Electrical Engineering: headed by the Chief Electrical Engineer, it managed the suburban railway electrification system, as well as power supply to stations.
- Accountancy: headed by the Controller of Accounts, it recorded all payments, prepared budgets, conducted audits, and paid salaries and wages to employees
- Commercial: headed by the Chief Commercial Manager, it set goods rates and passenger fares, solicited for new traffic to rail, and took action against by-laws offenders.
- Stores: headed by the Controller of Stores, it received all incoming stores and materials, and controlled the railway printing works.
- Refreshment Services: headed by the Superintendent of Refreshment Services, it controlled food and bookstore services at station, managed advertising at stations, as well as the railway bakery, butchery, poultry farm and laundry.

== Visual identification ==
Early version of the Victorian Railways "wings" as used on the Spirit of Progress

For most of the 20th century, the colours of royal blue and gold were the distinctive feature of the Victorian Railways. It was first introduced on the Spirit of Progress express train in 1937 along with the winged "VR" logo, and was refined to the final form with the arrival of the B class diesel electric locomotives in 1952. The revised logo was inspired by that of the Erie Railroad in the United States.

While the Spirit of Progress carriages wore the royal blue and gold striping, the remainder of the passenger fleet wore a more plain red livery. Additional carriages did not appear in the blue and gold until the 1954 Royal Tour by HM Queen Elizabeth II. Freight stock was painted in a slightly different red / brown with only identifying lettering painted in white on the side.

With the coming of the standard gauge line into Victoria in 1961, the Victorian Railways held a competition to find a "symbol, sign or slogan" to be carried on new freight vehicles for the line. The winner was an 18-year-old art student from Bentleigh, with the logo being a stylised VR with arrowheads on either end. By the 1970s most bogie vehicles wore the logo, until May 1983 pending the launch of V/Line.

'Teacup' logo used from 1981

In 1974, the Victorian Railways was rebranded as VicRail, with a new logo unveiled on 12 April 1976, but the royal blue and gold image was retained until 1981, when the orange and silver "teacup" scheme was launched on locomotives, Comeng trains, and passenger carriages. This was the last livery, with V/Line launched in August 1983 with a "stylised capital lettered logo with the V and the L split by a deep slashing stroke".

== Named trains ==
The Victorian Railways operated a number of named passenger trains, including the:

- Fruit Flyer
- Geelong Flier
- Great Northern Limited
- The Overland
- The Boat Train
- Spirit of Progress
- The Gippslander
- Intercapital Daylight
- Mildura Sunlight
- Southern Aurora
- The Northerner
- The Vinelander
- The West Coaster

The railways also operated a number of specialist trains that were used to bring services to rural and isolated populations. These included:

- Better Farming Train
- Reso Train
- Train of Knowledge

== Other functions ==
From 1888, the Victorian Railways began to take on a role in tourism, operating the Victorian Government Tourist Bureau until it was taken over by the state government in 1959. In connection with their role of promoting tourism, the railways ran three guesthouses/ski lodges which were taken over from previous operators: the Mount Buffalo Chalet from (1925–1985), the Feathertop Bungalow (1927–1939) and Hotham Heights (1934–1951).

In 1911, the Victorian Railways Commissioners assumed responsibility for the State Coal Mine at Wonthaggi from the Mines Department. VR also operated Newport Power Stations A and B.

Other operations included railway refreshment services, road motor services for passengers, and motor transport services for goods. The railways also operated two tram routes in Melbourne, the Electric Street Railways; the St Kilda to Brighton Beach Street Railway (1,600 mm or 5 ft 3 in gauge) from 1906 until 1959 and the Sandringham to Black Rock tramway (1,435 mm or 4 ft 8 1/2 in standard gauge) from 1919 to 1956.

== Publications ==
From 1930 until 1973, Victorian Railways News Letter was the Victorian Railways' inhouse journal. It was renamed Victorian Rail Ways in June 1973 and VicRail News in March 1981.

== See also ==
- Electoral district for Railway Officers, reserved constituency for Victorian Railways officers

Companies
Preceded by Various private operators	Victorian Railways; 19 March 1856 – 1974	Succeeded by Victorian Railways as VicRail
Preceded by Victorian Railways	Victorian Railways as VicRail; 1974 – 30 June 1983	Succeeded by State Transport Authority as V/Line (Regional)
Preceded by Victorian Railways	Victorian Railways as VicRail; 1974 – 30 June 1983	Succeeded by Metropolitan Transit Authority as The Met (Melbourne)
