= Victorian Railways wooden bogie passenger carriages =

Railway carriages from Australia

Victorian Railways, an Australian state railway operator, historically ran bogie passenger carriages, constructed with steel underframes and timber bodies up to 59 ft 9 in (18.21 m) long, as well as a few other carriages from the era.

A total of 640 locomotive-hauled, wooden-bodied, bogie carriages were constructed between 1874 and 1903, mostly to variants of the basic design. All carriages were designed to fit within the Victorian Railways' loading gauge, and to run on rails spaced 5 ft 3 in (1,600 mm) apart. All were fitted with buffers or, later, buffing plates, and all couplings were of the screw type.

In March 1903, the Victorian government announced that a Canadian, Thomas Tait, had been appointed as the new Chairman of Commissioners of the Victorian Railways. He immediately set out to introduce a new type of passenger carriage, inspired by the latest trends overseas. They would later be designated E type carriages, with the first being put into service in late 1906.

== Liveries ==
All carriages began with the then-standard dark maroon livery over a black underframe, with yellow pin-striping and details. During and after World War I, the detailing was abolished and they were painted plain red, with white text on black rectangles for running information, such as class and identity.

1954 saw a change to a much brighter red livery. Not many cars survived to the 1972 change of class designation from "Second" to "Economy".

== The first bogie carriage ==
M&HBURC No.21
- Constructed: 18xx
- Scrapped: 1957
- Capacity: 52 sitting over two compartments
- Operators: M&HBURC, later Victorian Railways
- Line served: South Suburban

Specifications
- Car body construction: Timber
- Car length: 39 ft (11.89 m) over body, 42 ft 1 1/2 in (12.84 m) over coupling points
- Width: 8 ft (2.44 m)
- Height: 12 ft 1 in (3.68 m)
- Doors: 2 each side
- Weight: 16 LT 2 cwt 0 qtr (16.36 t)
- Bogies: 26 ft 0 in (7.92 m) apart
- Coupling system: Screw
- Track gauge: 5 ft 3 in (1,600 mm)

The oldest wooden bogie passenger carriage owned by the Victorian Railways had been purchased from the Melbourne and Hobsons Bay United Railway Company as that company's carriage no.21. After purchase, it retained its number, with a note attached indicating that it was part of the South Suburban system. In 1879, it was re-classed 1A^{A} and, in 1888, it was changed again to 11B^{B}. The 1910 recoding saw it relabelled 11B. In 1940, the car was withdrawn from regular service and converted to workmen's sleeper 9WW. It was scrapped in 1957.

The body had two doors on either side for two compartments, each seating 26. The seats were installed against the walls, making for a sort of lounge arrangement.

== End platform cars ==
=== 64ft side-corridor sleeping cars ===
"Enterprise", later State Car No.1 "Perseverance", later Inspection Car, later "Norman"
- Manufacturer: Victorian Railways
- Built at: Newport Workshops
- Family name: Portland Sleeping Cars
- Constructed: 1890
- Entered service: 1890 to 1962
- Refurbished: 1900, 1914
- Scrapped: 1956
- Number built: 2
- Number scrapped: 2
- Capacity: 24 Sleeping, later 28 and 34 passengers
- Operator: Victorian Railways

Specifications
- Car body construction: Timber
- Car length: 64 ft (20 m) over body, 73 ft 6 1/2 in (22.416 m) over coupling points
- Width: 9 ft 6 1/2 in (2.908 m)
- Height: 12 ft 7 1/2 in (3.848 m) ("Enterprise"); 13 ft (4.0 m) ("Perseverance")
- Doors: End platforms
- Weight: 32 LT 2 cwt 0 qtr (32.62 t) ("Enterprise"); 32 LT 3 cwt 0 qtr (32.67 t) ("Perseverance")
- Bogies: 10 ft (3.0 m)
- Coupling system: Screw
- Track gauge: 5 ft 3 in (1,600 mm)

==== "Enterprise" and "Perseverance" ====
In 1890, two carriages were built to introduce a sleeping car service to Portland. "Enterprise" first ran during February 1890 and "Perseverance" first ran on 5 June of the same year.

The cars were based on earlier Mann-Boudoir carriages built for the Intercolonial Express running between Melbourne and Adelaide, but with a slightly longer body: 64 feet (20 m) rather than 62 feet 2 inches (18.95 m). The earlier cars had eight compartments for 20 passengers (six twinettes and two quadrettes), but the Portland cars had room for 24 passengers over eight compartments, as four twinettes and four quadrettes. They were organised with a single Ladies' twinette at one end, then two quadrettes, two central twinettes, two more quadrettes and a single smoking twinette at the far end. The Ladies' compartment, and the two central twinette compartments, were divided from the corridor by doors, whereas the other five compartments only had a curtain. Additionally, the two centre twinette compartments had a connecting door, so they could form a single, larger quadrette compartment if the need arose.

There is no reference explaining why "Perseverance" was slightly higher and heavier, but the 1904 diagram shows the Inspection Car as 13 ft 0 in (3.96 m). The post-1921 diagram for "Norman" has it slightly over 12 ft 1 in (3.68 m), and State Car No.1 is marked as 13 ft 1.875 in (4.01 m). It is possible that the height of the car changed with different bogie types or mounting methods, or the roof ventilators might have been changed.

The sleeper service to Portland was cancelled by 1900, so the cars became surplus to regular requirements. Both were extensively rebuilt and found new niche roles.

==== State Car 1 ====
To create State Car 1, "Enterprise" was largely gutted, and two large saloons were created in the centre of the carriage. The Gentlemen's Saloon measured 19 ft 9 1/4 in (6.026 m) and was provided with a table, three couches and six rounded plush seats. The Ladies' Saloon had four couches and four square plush seats, with a much smaller square table placed centrally. The outer two twinette compartments were retained, with buffet attendants' sitting and sleeping facilities provided adjacent to the Gentlemen's Saloon, and a Ladies Attendants' saloon provided at the opposite end. The end platforms were retained for access, and the bathrooms were generally unchanged. The car was renamed State Car No.1, to distinguish from the then-planned State Cars 2 and 3. Given that the latter two were originally referred to as Royal Cars during the planning stages, it seems likely that the same was applied to "Enterprise" during its rebuild. In August 1936, the car was fitted with automatic couplers, but it could be fitted with transition hooks if required. It was used until 1950, when State Car No.5 was built, rendering most of the other State Cars obsolete. By 1953, State Car No.1 had been scrapped, with the underframe transferred to "Norman".

==== Inspection Car/Norman ====
"Perseverance" was rebuilt as the "Inspection Car" for the use of the Victorian Railways' Commissioner (at the time there was only one), accommodating 28 staff members. Like "Enterprise", it was entirely cleared out, but also underwent some structural changes. The window arrangement was changed, with many paired windows joined into a single frame to give a better view for railway staff. Although it is not clear, it is assumed that, as with "Enterprise", the diagram was flipped when transcribed to the 1904 rolling stock book, and the corridor shown at the bottom of the image is the same as that previously shown at the top. With that in mind, from the former smoking end, the layout changed from 1, 1, 2, 3, 3, 2, 2, 3, 3, 2, 1, 1 to 1(1+1), 1(2), 1(3), 1, 1 (former 3), 2, 2, 3, 1+2(3), 1(2), 1(1+1). The interior of the former smoking end was replaced with a 10-seat saloon area, the centre of the carriage was replaced with a kitchen and lavatory, and the former ladies' end of the car was fitted with a 24 ft (7.3 m) saloon with six chairs, four couches and an extending table, for a total capacity of 18. No formal sleeping facility was provided, though the couch pairs could have been used as beds. The car was renamed "Norman" on 20 January 1921, after the former Chairman of Commissioners, C. E. Norman, and around the same time, extra chairs were added, raising capacity to 30.

In 1953, the underframe of "Norman" was replaced with that formerly under State Car No.1. That meant the car became representative of all five variants of the ex-Portland sleeping car designs, with parts from both mixed together. The car was withdrawn in 1963, allowing the "Norman" name to be transferred to the former steel Parlor car. The original car was taken to the Newport Railway Museum, and was placed on a historic register on 13 July 1983. Shortly after the car entered the museum, its worn seating was removed and replaced with bench seats previously used in carriage 13AE.

=== 65ft 2in Pioneer cars ===
Pioneer cars, later "Enterprise" (2nd) & "Pioneer"
- Manufacturer: Victorian Railways
- Built at: Newport Workshops
- Family name: Pioneer Cars
- Constructed: 1893
- Entered service: 1893 to 1983
- Refurbished: 1921, 1968
- Number built: 2
- Number preserved: 2
- Capacity: 64 passengers ("Enterprise"); 72 passengers ("Pioneer")
- Operator: Victorian Railways

Specifications
- Car body construction: Timber
- Car length: 65 ft 2 in (19.86 m) over body, 73 ft 8 in (22.45 m) over coupling points
- Width: 9 ft 3/8 in (2.753 m)
- Height: 12 ft 10 5/8 in (3.927 m) ("Enterprise") 13 ft (4.0 m) ("Pioneer")
- Doors: End platforms
- Weight: 34 LT 17 cwt 0 qtr (35.41 t) ("Pioneer" 1st / 12BL / "Enterprise") 36 LT 6 cwt 0 qtr (36.88 t) ("Pioneer" 2nd / 13BL / "Pioneer")
- Bogies: 48 ft (15 m) ("Enterprise"); 48 ft 2 in (14.68 m) ("Pioneer")
- Coupling system: Screw
- Track gauge: 5 ft 3 in (1,600 mm)

"Pioneer" 1st and 2nd were built in 1893 for use on the Bendigo line. Both were 65 ft 2 in (19.86 m) long over the body mounted on six-wheel bogies, with a side corridor and sheltered end-platforms. The cars operated as a pair, one for first-class passengers (eight compartments, including two smoking and two ladies, seating 64) and the other for second-class passengers (nine compartments, including two smoking and two ladies, seating 72). However, a premium was charged for travel in either car. Both had been fitted with two lavatories by 1895. In 1921, the two carriages were converted to 12BL and 13BL.

During World War II, 13BL was used in an ambulance train as a staff carriage. It is thought that 12BL was stored during that time.

Both cars were used as accommodation on the Wirth's Circus Train in the 1950s. The circus staff complained about the poor condition of the carriages, which, by that stage, were over 60 years old.

In 1962, the pair were withdrawn from the circus train and, in 1968, they were returned to service in the consist of the "Vintage Train", being renamed "Enterprise" and "Pioneer" respectively. The name "Enterprise" had last been used on the carriage later known as State Car No.1. Both were placed on the Victorian Historic Vehicles Register in July 1983.

== Compartment cars (45ft type) ==
45ft Body
- Manufacturer: Victorian Railways
- Built at: Newport Workshops
- Family name: 45ft Carriages
- Constructed: 1887
- Entered service: 1887 to 1982
- Number built: 363
- Operator: Victorian Railways

Specifications
- Car body construction: Timber
- Car length: 45 ft 0 in (13.72 m) over body, 48 ft 2 1/2 in (14.694 m) over coupling points
- Width: 8 ft 6 in (2.59 m)
- Height: 12 ft 6 1/8 in (3.813 m)
- Doors: Outward-swinging
- Weight: 18 LT 14 cwt 0 qtr (19.00 t) to 20 LT 14 cwt 0 qtr (21.03 t)
- Bogies: 4 ft (1.2 m); 6 ft 6 in (1.98 m)
- Coupling system: Screw
- Track gauge: 5 ft 3 in (1,600 mm)

This section covers all fully-enclosed wooden bogie passenger carriages, initially built at 45 feet (14 m) over body, as well as later conversions and extensions. 363 carriages of the type were constructed from 1887 to 1902.

The typical carriage had a set of individual compartments seating ten passengers. The main difference between classes was the width of compartments, with exclusively first-class carriages fitted with six compartments, composite (first and second-class) carriages typically with three first class compartments flanked by two second class compartments either side, and exclusively second-class carriages fitted with eight compartments. Compartments contained two bench seats, with a central footway connecting to outward-swinging doors either side, which could be locked with a standard square carriage key.

In the exclusively first-class carriages, compartments were 7 ft 3 7/8 in (2.232 m) wide, including the 2 ft 3 in (0.69 m) footway and the two 2 ft 6 7/16 in (0.773 m) seats.

In the exclusively second-class carriages, compartments were 6 ft 3 3/16 in (1.910 m) wide, including the 2 ft 2 7/16 in (0.672 m) footway and the two 2 ft 3/8 in (0.619 m) seats.

In the composite carriages, the first-class compartments were 6 ft 9 1/2 in (2.1 m) wide, including the 2 ft 3 in (0.69 m) footway and the two 2 ft 3 1/2 in (0.699 m) seats, and the second class compartments were 5 ft 9 1/4 in (1.759 m) wide, including the 2 ft 1 in (0.64 m) footway and the two 1 ft 10 1/8 in (0.562 m) seats.

1887:

- AD^{AD} 1–6

1888:

- A^{A} 15–17, 20, 25–54 & 85–98
- AB^{AB} 4 & 7
- AD^{AD} 7–12

1889:

- A^{A} 18, 55–84, 99–137, 148, 150, 158, 161, 167, 170, 191–192, 194–195, 197–200, 202, 208 & 221

1890:

- A^{A} 21–24, 138–147, 149, 151–157, 159–160, 162–166, 168–169, 171–175, 185–190, 193/York, 196, 235–237 & 259–262
- BE^{BE} 2
- O 26 & 27
- AD^{AD} 13–14 & 16–33
- BE^{BE} 1

1891:

- A^{A} 176–180, 201, 203–207, 209–220, 222–234, 238–250 & 263–274
- O 28
- AD^{AD} 34–62

1892:

- A^{A} 251–258 & 275–284
- AB^{AB} 5 & 6
- B^{B} 12–19

1893:

- AB^{AB} 21 & 22

1897:

- AD^{AD} 63–68

1898:

- AD^{AD} 69–74

1902:

- A^{A} 1–6

=== Governor's Car / York ===
193A^{A}, Governor's Car (State), York, 4A
- Constructed: 1890
- Fleet numbers: 1 of 271
- Operator: Victorian Railways

Specifications
- Car body construction: Timber
- Car length: 45 ft (13.72 m) over body, 48 ft 2 1/2 in (14.69 m) over coupling points
- Width: 8 ft 6 in (2.59 m)
- Height: 12 ft 6 1/8 in (3.81 m)
- Weight: 19 LT 15 cwt 0 qtr (20.07 t)
- Bogies: 32 ft 10 in (10.01 m) apart 6 ft 6 in (1.98 m) between axle centres
- Coupling system: Screw
- Track gauge: 5 ft 3 in (1,600 mm)

193A^{A} was built by Ellis and entered service on 3 November 1890, as just one of the range of first class fully enclosed bogie carriages. The car had seven identical 6 ft 3 in (1.91 m) compartments, each with three windows – two in line with the bench seats, and one in the outward-swinging door. Full-height partitions separated the compartments, placed behind every third window.

In 1894 the car was returned to the workshops and rebuilt for special service. When it re-entered service it had been completely cleared out, and most of the external doors were sealed. The new car was called the Governor's Car (State), and featured a ladies lavatory and water closet at one end (windows 1 & 2), then two saloons with lounge chairs and tables (windows 3 to 9 and 10 to 17), a gentlemen's lavatory and water closet with a side corridor (windows 18 and 19), then a small buffet counter at the far end (windows 20 and 21). Most of the external doors were sealed, leaving one each side per saloon, and three for accessing the buffet area at the gentlemen's end.

In April 1901 the car was renamed York, and the fittings in the two saloons were cleared out and replaced with 8 ft 5 in (2.6 m) x 2 ft 4 in (0.7 m) tables and assorted plush chairs for a total capacity of 22 passengers. The car was fitted with a handbrake in 1907.

On 11 June 1919 the car was modified and returned to regular 1st class passenger service, as 4A. On 31 December 1927 it was reclassified as a second-class vehicle 145B at Jolimont Workshops, then in 1958 it was converted to workmen's sleeper 78WW. A few months later it was renumbered 67WW.

== Corridor compartment cars ==
=== Corridor cars A^{C}, later AL, BL, 59ABL (45' 0") ===
1-12A^{C} converted ex A^{A} swing-door cars in 1902, by adding corridors through one side of the carriage, reducing the size of all six compartments. Each compartment was given a new face into the corridor, but the external doors on both sides were retained. The reduced compartment sizes changed capacity from 60 seats to only 34.

10A^{C} was destroyed in 1906 at Kirkstall.

Recoded 1AL-10AL (ex 1–9, 11), 59ABL (ex 12) in 1910, then 1-10BL in 1913 and 11BL in 1918.

=== Corridor cars AB^{C}, later ABL (50' 2") ===
The initial build was of 58 AB^{C} carriages, 50 ft 2 in (15.29 m) over body but with an internal corridor along one side, as opposed to the then-standard individual compartment design. The cars were released to service over the period 1899–1903, numbered 1 through 58. Most of the cars had capacity for 16 1st and 32 2nd class passengers, though numbers 40, 48 and 53–58 had a different interior with room for 18 1st and 28 2nd class passengers. Unlike most rollingstock, the AB^{C}/ABL cars had a vertical white line painted on both sides of the carriage, showing the gap between 1st and 2nd class accommodation.

In 1910 the carriages were reclassed ABL.

59ABL was converted from 12A^{C} in 1910, but converted to 11BL in 1918. During its time as an ABL it was shorter, with less capacity, than the rest of the class.

Cars ABL 3, 5, 10, 31 were converted to workmen's sleeper cars in the early 1960s, taking numbers 85-88WW. All other cars were withdrawn between 1959 and 1968, and 29ABL was the last to be scrapped in 1973 (though it had been withdrawn in 1962).

== Disposal and preservation ==
The vast majority of carriages listed on this page were destroyed and burnt as a quick, easy form of disposal. Some were sold as sheds or a cheap form of housing, and a handful were retained for preservation.

The current known remnants are:

- 3ABL was recovered as 85WW and is held at Moorooduc.
- 45ABL was retained for preservation and is currently awaiting restoration at Steamrail Ballarat.
