= Harris (train) =

Melbourne suburban electric multiple unit train

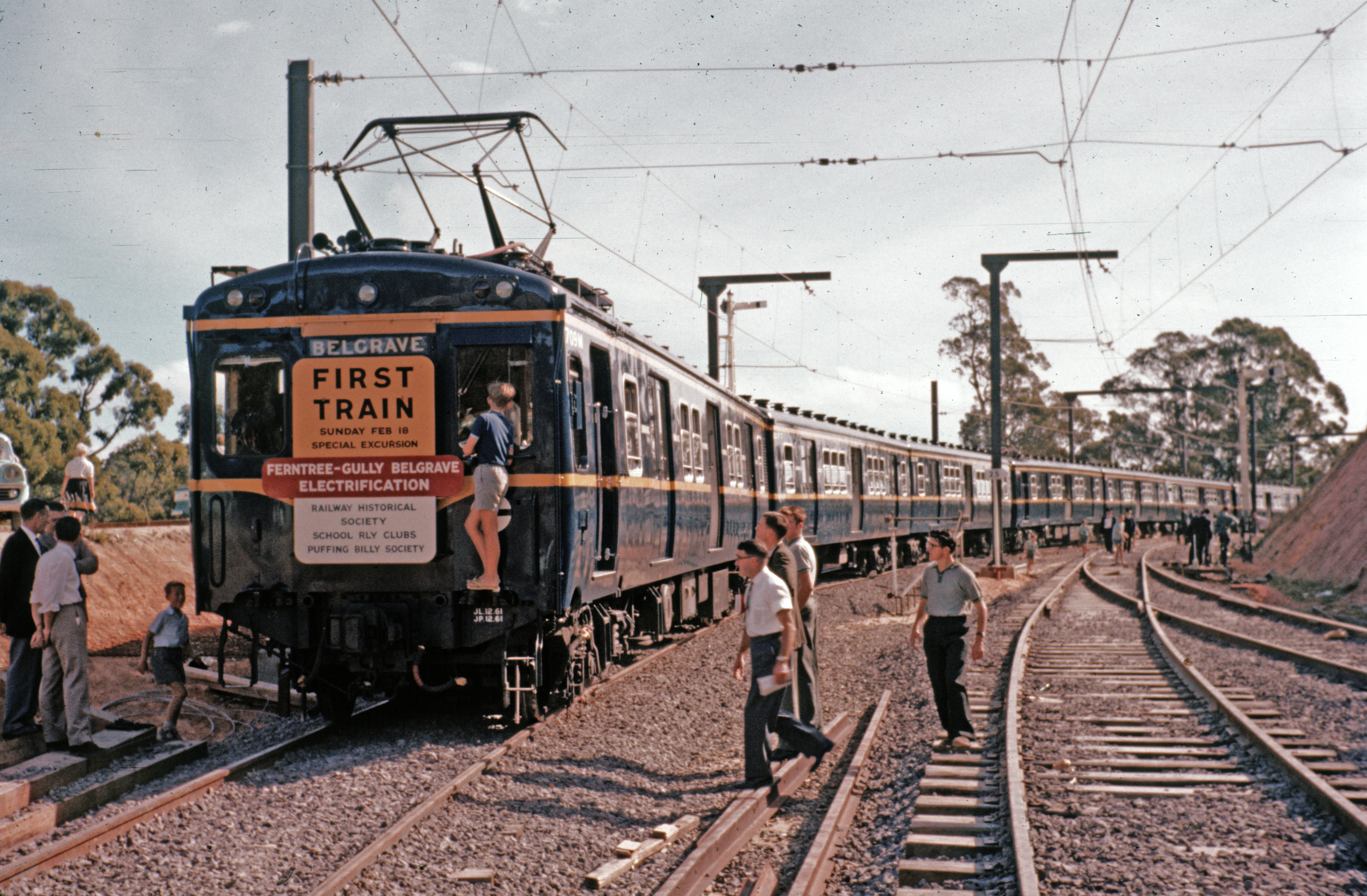
- Harris train in February 1962 at Belgrave

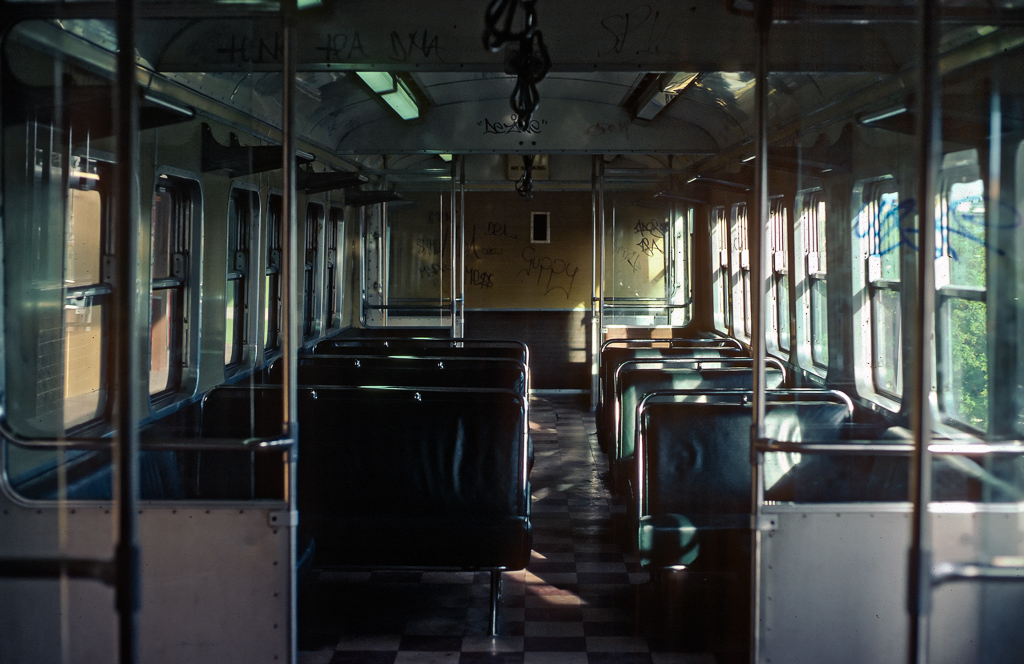
- The interior of a motor car prior to refurbishment
- Manufacturers: Gloucester Railway Carriage and Wagon Company (early M cars); Martin & King (later M and T cars); Victorian Railways Newport Workshops (later M and T cars)
- Replaced: 'Swing Door'
- Constructed: 1956–1971
- Entered service: 1956
- Refurbished: 1982–1988
- Scrapped: 1988, some converted to other uses
- Number built: 60 seven-car sets (30 first series, 30 second series), plus ten motor cars 791M–800M and six long trailer cars 891–896T (total 436)
- Number in service: 2 stored 'M' cars, formerly used on the 'Greaser' train, currently awaiting restoration as passenger carriages by Steamrail Victoria.
- Number preserved: 22 (18 converted into H type carriages,2 over head wire maintenance vehicles, 1 original motor car, 1 "Grey Ghost" motor car)
- Number scrapped: 373
- Formation: M-T-T-M "Blocks" and BT-T-M "Units"
- Fleet numbers: 501M–590M (1st series motors), 701M–800M (2nd series motors), 501–560BT (backing trailers), 601–690T and 801–890T (trailers), 891–896T (long trailers)
- Capacity: 501M–590M: 59 seated, 172 crush 701M–781M: 65 seated, 164 crush 782M–790M: 71 seated, 155 crush 799M: 64 seated, 175 crush 601T–690T: 72 seated, 198 crush 632T: 60 seated, 216 crush 673T: 64 seated, 205 crush 801T–861T: 80 seated, 183 crush 862T: 64 seated, 209 crush 863T–875T: 80 seated, 183 crush 876T–889T: 82 seated, 179 crush 890T: 72 seated, ??? crush 891T–896T: 92 seated, 263 crush 560BT: 68 seated, 212 crush
- Operator: Victorian Railways
- Depot: Jolimont Yard
- Line served: All Melbourne Suburban

Specifications
- Car body construction: Painted steel
- Car length: 61 ft 1 11/16 in (18.64 m) over body, some 75 ft (22.86 m) trailers
- Width: 9 ft 8 3/4 in (2.97 m) over body panels, 9 ft 9 in (2.97 m) over window rivets, 10 ft (3.05 m) over grab rails
- Height: 12 ft 4 in (3.76 m) over body, 12 ft 8.75 in (3.88 m) over flettner vents
- Floor height: 4 ft (1.22 m)
- Articulated sections: Open gangway (added later)
- Wheelbase: 8 ft (2.44 m) bogies at 43 ft (13.11 m) centres, total per carriage 51 ft (15.54 m); long trailers 53 ft (16.15 m) centres for total 61 ft (18.59 m) wheelbase
- Maximum speed: 70 mph (113 km/h) in service, 80 mph (130 km/h) design maximum
- Weight: 701M-790M & 799M: 46 long tons 0 cwt 3 qtr (46.78 t) 560T & 801T-889T: 30 LT 16 cwt 2 qtr (31.32 t); 632T & 673T: 32 LT 6 cwt 2 qtr (32.84 t) 891T-896T: 37 LT 8 cwt 2 qtr (38.03 t) (est.)
- Traction motors: 4 x EE528A (first series), 4 x EE539 (second series)
- Power output: 4 x 151 kW (202 hp) (first series), 4 x 113 kW (152 hp) (second series)
- Acceleration: 0.8m/s
- Deceleration: 0.75m/s (service); 1.15m/s (emergency)
- Electric system: 1.5 kV DC Overhead lines
- Multiple working: Within own fleet only
- Track gauge: 5 ft 3 in (1,600 mm)

The Harris trains are the first steel-bodied electric multiple unit (EMU) trains to operate on the suburban railway network of Melbourne, Victoria, Australia. They were introduced in 1956, by the Victorian Railways, and last operated in 1988, although a number of the carriages were converted for other uses and are still operating. They were named after Norman Charles Harris, Chairman of Commissioners of the Victorian Railways, between 1940 and 1950.

== Description ==
The Harris trains were commonly referred to as "Blue Trains" due to their deep blue livery, complemented by a yellow band about halfway up the body. Royal blue and yellow were common colours for the Victorian Railways passenger rolling stock in the post-war era.

The trains had a saloon seating layout, divided into smaller sections by full-height partitions. They were provided with either two or three sets of hand-operated dual sliding doors on each side of the carriage. Later Harris sets were fitted with power doors. Carriages were designated as first or second class until 1958, when one-class suburban travel was introduced. Interiors were split into smoking and no-smoking compartments until late 1978, after which smoking on trains was prohibited. Most of the carriages were delivered without end gangways between carriages, but safety concerns led to them being added in the final five sets delivered from mid-1966. Those sets were also fitted with only two doors per carriage side rather than three, permitting additional seating and reflecting the increasing average travel distance.

The first thirty trains were fitted with automatic couplers at both ends of all carriages, and the second series with semi-permanent drawbars, except for the driving ends of motor carriages, and one end of BT ("backing trailer") carriages. Later, drawbars were fitted in the middle of first series blocks and units, although the final ten motor cars had automatic couplers at both ends.

First-series motor cars had 59 second-class seats and trailers 72 seats (first class in the T cars or second class in the BT cars), divided into smoking and non-smoking sections. For the second series the internal partitions were removed, and capacities increased to 65 and 80 passengers respectively for a total gain of 50 seats per seven-car train. Smoking was then only permitted in the middle third of each carriage. Later, a policy change saw smoking permitted in the whole of each Motor carriage, and not at all in trailers.

== History ==
The first 30 7-carriage trains, known as the first series, were constructed in the United Kingdom by Gloucester Railway Carriage and Wagon Company, and delivered between 1956 and 1959. Another 30, the second series, were built by Martin & King in Melbourne, and delivered between 1961 and 1967. From 1966, these were delivered with end doors and gangways between carriages, allowing passengers to change carriages.

The first series of "T" and "BT" trailers were built by Comeng (the first 10 in Sydney, the rest in Melbourne), and finished by Martin & King, with the remainder built at the Newport Workshops. Between 1968 and 1970, ten additional motor carriages, built by the Victorian Railways' Newport Workshops, were delivered to provide for some Harris trains to be lengthened to eight carriages.

In 1970 and 1971, six new trailer carriages were built as prototypes for the next fleet (the Hitachi trains). These carriages were 75 feet (22.86 m) long, compared to 63 feet (19.20 m) of the earlier carriages, and were equipped with the mechanisms for power-closing doors, the first such use in Melbourne. However, it was not until the following year that a complete (4-carriage) train was used this way, after conversion of some motor carriages. These carriages were converted into H type carriages, for use in LH sets with V/Line, in the mid 1980s.

== Operations ==
The Harris trains were originally run as 7-carriage (M-T-T-M-BT-T-M) sets, reduced to 4-carriage (M-T-T-M) sets for off-peak and weekend services. The M-T-T-M sets were known as "Blocks", while the BT-T-M sets were called "Units". The first thirty 7-car sets were delivered between 1956 and 1959, and the following thirty sets between 1961 and 1967. Initially the two types were kept separate because of the differing motor unit performance, and within the second series the final five trains had to be kept separate because of the inter-carriage walkways. This proved difficult to manage and in 1962 the segregation instruction was withdrawn. The first carriage to have walkways retrofitted was 862T in 1967, when it was rebuilt following fire damage.

In 1968-69 a further ten Motor cars were delivered. At the same time, some of the Units were reduced to BT-M only and allocated to the Sandringham Line, and these actions together allowed for the formation of additional M-T-T-M blocks so that eight-car trains could run on busier routes including Lilydale, Belgrave and Glen Waverley. Later platform extensions permitted operation of eight-car trains on the Frankston, Pakenham, Alamein, Upfield, Broadmeadows, St Albans and Williamstown lines. Occasionally, M-M pairs would also be used on shuttle services between Dandenong and Pakenham.

When the extended trailer cars entered service they were coupled to the new M cars, which had their power-closing door equipment activated or installed as required. The first set was 799M-891T-892T-800M (order unclear), and two more blocks were assembled using four of the seven motors in the range 792M-798M. In 1972 further cars 791M, 887T-890T and 557BT-560BT had the same equipment installed, giving a total of ten motors, six extended and four regular trailers and four backing trailers available to assemble three Long Blocks and four Units fitted with power door equipment. At this point, the total fleet would have been 62 Short Blocks, 3 Long Blocks with power-closing doors, 4 Pairs, 52 normal units and 4 Units with power-closing doors. The long blocks were mixed in with other sets as required; as of early 1974, a regular roster featured an eight-car Harris train including one regular and one long block. This made for a total length almost 100ft longer than a regular seven-car set.

Another difference between the first- and second-series trains was the destination rolls; the former had included Carnegie, North Williamstown, Elsternwick, Ashburton, Blackburn, Macaulay, Thomastown and Rosanna, which were replaced in the latter with Mentone, Crib Point, Holmesglen, Belgrave and Upfield.

=== Notable uses ===
Aside from normal suburban train use, Harris trains featured in a handful of special services. Two trains, a seven-car and special ten-car set (composed of two Units and a Block) ran to Warragul on 23 February 1963 for royal traffic, and around the same time a ten- and eleven-car set (two Blocks with a Unit between them) ran to Geelong, respectively hauled by locomotives T332 and B65.

Another example was the use of a Harris seven-car train on 28 November 1972, when the Laverton Primary School ran a special trip to the Puffing Billy Railway. The train left Flinders Street, empty, for Spencer Street station then was hauled by a T class locomotive to Laverton, turning there for a 9:50 am departure and haul back to Spencer Street. From there the engine detached and the train ran under its own power between Spencer Street and Belgrave (11:20 am to 1:30 pm), with similar arrangements used for the trip to and from Laverton in the afternoon.

== Modifications ==
By the time the first ten 7-car sets had been delivered, it was found that the buffing plates between carriages would bind when going around tight curves or through complicated point-work, so this equipment was removed in time for delivery of the 11th train. However, this left a lot of slack between carriages, so acceleration and braking would be both rough and noisy.

Around the same time, the Victorian Railways was experimenting with replacing cast-iron brake blocks with a non-metallic compound (probably asbestos), so Set 11 was fitted with these, and tested between Seaford and Frankston, in 5 mph (8.0 km/h) increments up to line speed, in both directions. Four tests were made - first using the non-metallic brake blocks with empty and later loaded with cast-iron blocks, equal in weight to a crush load of passengers, and then with the cast iron brake blocks fitted to the train, as well as simulating the load, and finally the empty train with cast iron brake blocks. It was found that the new type of brake blocks performed better at higher speeds, but worse at lower speeds, so on average they gave similar performance and were approved for use. A similar test was later conducted with the Walker railmotors between Laverton and Werribee.

In the 1960s, the fleet was fitted with Guard-to-Driver bell communication circuits.

Wheel slip was found to be a problem with the more powerful 500-series motors, so in the late 1960s through early 1970s the "weak field" power generation, which used the back-EMF from the motors, was disconnected. 547M was fitted with an experimental wheel-slip solution, but the final implementation as applied across the fleet would close off the power supply, then re-open it bypassing the acceleration control when wheel-slip was detected, with limited success. The weak-field system was reconnected in the late 1970s to early 1980s in order to keep up with amended timetables, but this brought back the wheel slip issues.

By the time the second series (700+) Harris cars were being delivered, the design had been improved somewhat. A second window was fitted at the front of the Motor carriages for the guard and/or instructor driver to view the track, along with a window from the Guard's compartment into the passenger saloon, and walkways were added between all carriages within each Block or Unit. These latter changes were retrofitted to many of the 500-series carriages as well, following concerns about safety. While the 500-series trains had rotary flettner ventilators fitted; these were mounted on the curve of the roof and spun off-centre, causing a grinding noise. This was fixed in the second series with the units fitted level to the carriage floor. These units were also later fitted to the clerestory-roofed Tait stock, with their opening ceiling-windows being sealed to reduce maintenance costs.

The last few vehicles constructed were used as test-beds for features in the upcoming Hitachi train design. 560BT, when issued to service, had a short stainless steel exterior panel between the centre windows. Similar stainless steel panels were placed around bridgeworks at East Richmond, the purpose of both to check for weathering and cleaning methods. The last six trailer vehicles, 891-896T, were 75 ft (23 m) long over body instead of 63 ft (19 m) to test clearances at platforms and junctions along with passenger flows. However, the cars were significantly heavier and when coupled to 700-series motors already featuring weaker acceleration further impacting timekeeping.

While the last ten motors (791M-800M) were issued without asbestos insulation, only the last three had additional insulation in the ceiling. 799M was a further modification of the type with a forced draught ventilation system, shared with the long trailers, while 798M and 800M used the normal flettner ventilators. Similarly, 556-560BT and the long trailers were not fitted with asbestos.

By the mid-1970s, individual Harris cars were being sent to Bendigo North Workshops for fitting of end doors and gangways. Examples included 702M, 621T and 684T in September 1975.

=== Renumbering ===
As new Comeng sets were delivered in the mid-late 1980s the remaining Harris cars were renumbered out of the new number block.

To achieve this the first-series Harris motors had a "1" prefix added, e.g. 501M became 1501M. By January 1986 the renumbered cars were all from 1501-1590, except 503, 514, 539, 547, 554-556 and 572, which retained their original numbers, and scrapped cars 506, 512-513, 518, 520, 524, 526, 529, 533-534, 557-558, 567, 578, 580, 586, 588 and 590M.

The BT trailers from both series had a "2" prefix added, with 2502, 515, 2519, 2535, 2539, 2540, 2551 and 2560 sighted.

The first series T trailers were similarly given a "2" prefix as 2604-2606, 2612, 2620, 2624, 2638, 2642, 2645, 2652, 2654, 2658 and 2686; second series T trailers were also given the prefix, despite no conflict between them and the new cars, with 2802, 2807, 2813, 2825,2826, 2837, 2843, 2845, 2846, 2849, 2850, 2858, 2863, 2864, 2867, 2883, 2888 and 2889.

Two of the long trailers, 895T and 896T, had been renumbered 2895T and 2896T, before conversion to H type carriages.

== Conversions and disposal ==
719M was the first Harris car of any type to be scrapped, due to fire damage at Sunshine in February 1973. It was scrapped at Newport Workshops on 16 September 1975, having been judged as too expensive to repair.

With the exceptions of the last few carriages built, all Harris trains contained asbestos insulation. The first sets contained blue asbestos, and the later sets contained white asbestos. Due to the presence of asbestos, most were disposed of in the 1990s, by being buried at Talbot Quarry in Clayton, a south-eastern suburb of Melbourne, some having been wrapped in plastic.

One of the last to go may have been 769M, which alongside Hitachi motor 71M (as 137M) had been stored in as stripped condition at the west end of Flinders Street, apparently for driver training purposes.

No original Harris trailer cars remain, with all trailers having been converted to locomotive-hauled H cars or scrapped. Additionally, no first series motor units were preserved, the three remaining unmodified cars being high-numbered second series M cars.

=== Ozride (Pink) set ===
In the mid 1980s, three cars were painted pink on the ends and one side for a railway safety video, reportedly demonstrating how not to run a railway. The set was 780M-674T-1555M, and operated with locomotive T334, with filming taking place primarily on the Geelong-Gheringhap line on 17 July 1986, and at Spencer Street on 17, 19 and 21 July 1986. The motor cars had their pantographs removed for the duration of filming.

The full "OzRide – It's your Business" video was uploaded by the Mornington Tourist Railway to YouTube on 5 October 2026.

After the completion of filming the Harris cars were towed to Dandenong, then trucked to the disposal quarry; locomotive T334 was listed for sale.

=== Met (Green) set ===
Newsrail reported in September 1983 that a Harris set had been painted green with gold lining for the Metropolitan Transit Authority at Newport Workshops, but that due to costs and "revulsion by some head office officials" the train set was ordered to be repainted back to the normal blue scheme. In lieu of the planned refurbishment scheme the Harris fleet was merely given a "spruce up" to keep them functional pending withdrawals starting in 1986.

The motor cars are known to have been 521M and 528M and the trailers are believed to have been 641T and 863T.

=== Greaser (Yellow) set ===
As the last of the Harris cars were being withdrawn, two motor cars, 794M and 797M, were set aside. These two had previously been used as motive power to transfer withdrawn Harris cars from Jolimont to Dandenong for disposal, taking over from pair 734M–705M when the former re-entered normal service and the latter was scrapped.

The two cars were sighted at Newport Workshops undergoing conversion and repainting on 2 November 1989, but had not yet entered service by 11 November.

=== Refurbished (White) sets ===
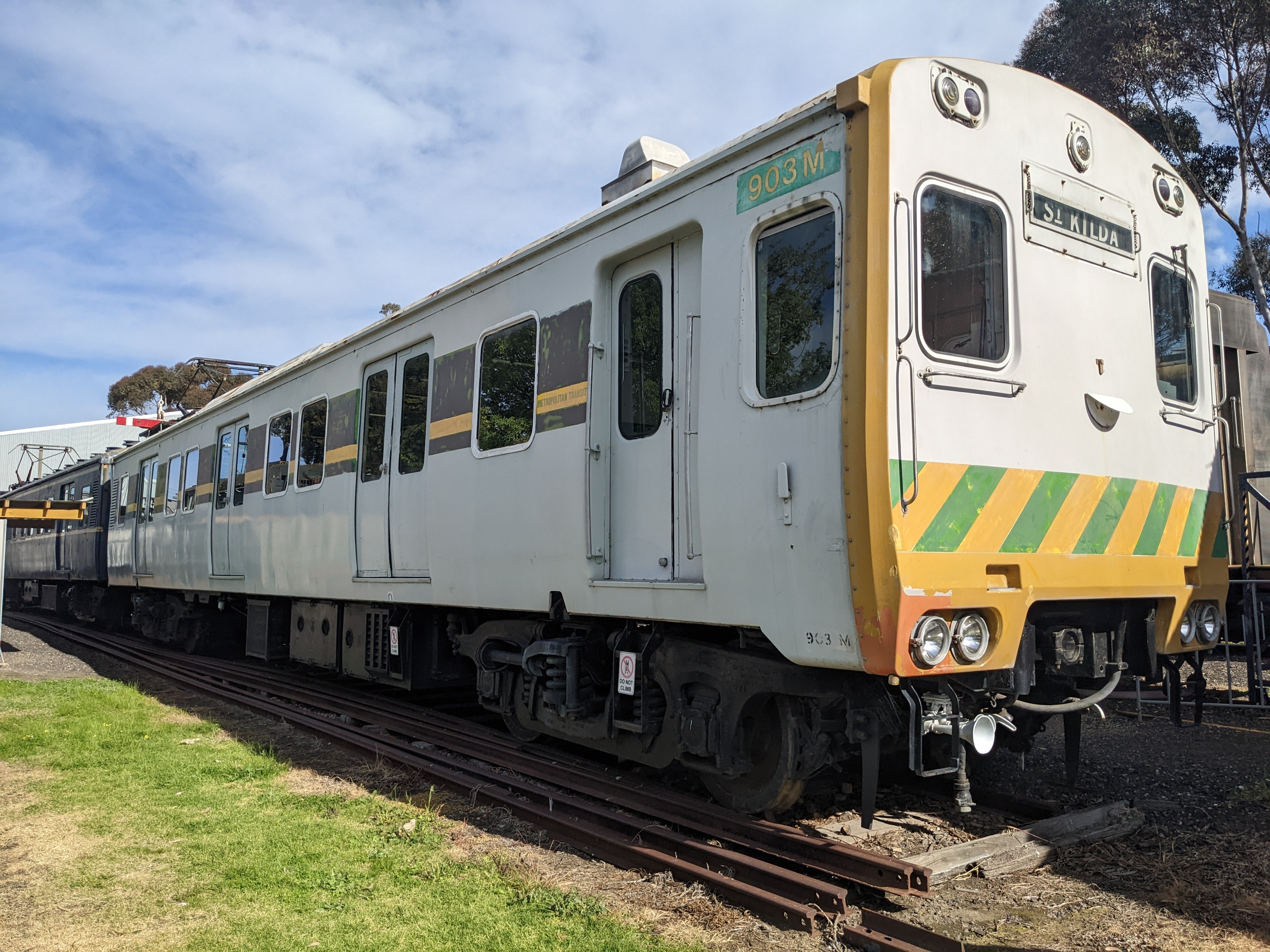
Refurbished Harris motor 903M at the Newport Railway Museum, September 2022

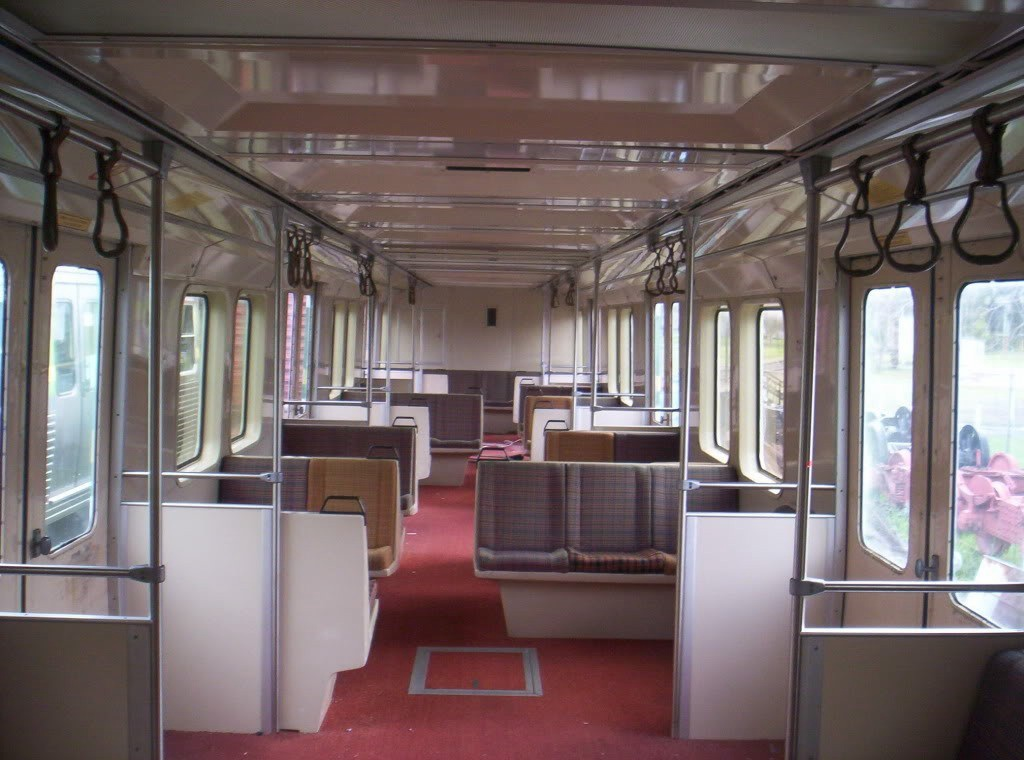
Interior of a Refurbished Harris carriage at the Newport Railway Museum

A program to refurbish the Harris trains began in 1982. The interior of the refurbished cars resembled a Comeng interior, having individual vinyl foam type seat cushions on an integrated plastic frame, replacing the former more traditional vinyl sprung seats. Each motor carriage was modernised with a fibreglass front clip, the pantographs relocated to the rear of the carriage and Scharfenberg couplers replacing the original knuckle couplers. The upgraded front clip also featured Comeng-style quad high and low beam headlights, replacing the single central headlight of the original Harris design, however the destination signs and marker lights remained unchanged. The driver's controls were also changed to a Comeng-style layout. The refurbished cars also had air conditioning, sealed windows, self-closing doors, and a new colour scheme. Due to their predominantly grey livery, with only a pair of orange stripes along the sides, the refurbished trains were known as "Grey Ghosts".

The four refurbished trains ran initially in an M-T-T-M configuration, but were remarshalled in January 1990 to two M-T-T-M-T-M and one M-T-T-M set; the latter was reduced to only M-T-M with a trailer car removed as a test. Eventually they were remarshalled to M-T-M-M-T-M configuration, with four spare trailers.

The refurbished trains generally ran on the Port Melbourne, St Kilda and Sandringham lines. They never ran in the City Loop, except for a farewell tour on 6 April 1991. The restriction to these three lines was due to the additional weight of the refurbished carriages, which meant the sets were underpowered for all but Melbourne's flattest corridors. While the passenger areas were upgraded and included two air conditioning units per car, the mechanical components were still unmodified, and still using the 1960s-era second series motors which were in fact less powerful than the first series cars of 1956.

Industrial and other problems with the refurbished trains, in conjunction with excessive costs of conversion compared to construction of entirely new carriages, meant that only 16 carriages were converted before the program was stopped.

The motor units were originally numbered in the 601-608M range, though these numbers later came into conflict with the Comeng fleet, and so in mid-late 1984, the cars were renumbered into the 901-908M range. The trailers were released to service in the 101-108T range, becoming 1501-1508T in 1983, and then 3501-3508T in 1984. In 1984, the carriages were repainted into The Met's green and yellow livery.

The refurbished trains were withdrawn in 1991, with five motor units (901M and 904-907M) cut up for scrap. The last rostered trip was on 20 March 1991 but a defective trailer had to be removed. The set was split and the defective carriage removed by engine Y135 two days later. One refurbished carriage, 903M, has been preserved, and is on display at the Newport Railway Museum. All eight refurbished trailer cars were converted to standard H type passenger cars, along with motors 902M and 908M which were converted to the BCH sub-class, specifically, "short van" carriages BCH134 and BCH135. The eight trailers became BIH 187, 191, 193, 194, 189, 188, 192 and 190 respectively; with 187 and 188 entering service in 1990, and the rest in 1992. They were used to increase the length of existing H type sets from three to four, and four to five carriages.

=== V/Line sets ===
55 carriages, including four of the six the 75 ft (23 m) carriages, were converted to H type carriages for interurban service and were in operation with V/Line from 1984 to February 2024. Harris motor car 711M was sighted near the Comeng siding in Dandenong South in 1982, apparently having been used to test different paints as part of the process; this car would later be rebuilt as BCH128.

At the same time, four carriages were converted to MTH carriages, which were used as trailer cars behind DERM and DRC railmotors for many years. In later years, they were used on the Stony Point line, behind A class diesel locomotives until 26 April 2008, when Sprinter trains were introduced on the route. MTH102 was converted to a special overhead inspection car for Metro Trains Melbourne, and is now numbered IEV102.

=== Final years ===
Operation of the Harris trains was wound up as the final Comeng sets were delivered.

On the evening of 5 February 1985, a seven car set was set ablaze while stabled at Sunshine; the set was 796M-613T-552BT-757M-830T-839T-1551M; 830T was completely burnt out, though adjacent 839T and 757M were reportedly undamaged. Another attack on 21 April 1987 destroyed 853T, at the time in consist 720M-2568T-521BT-1584M-853T-869T-738M.

At some point on or before 28 April 1987, 514BT had been converted to T trailer car formation, by replacing the coupling with a drawbar, painting over the "B", and attaching it to 1504M in the middle of a seven-car set with 757M and 1548M.

Sightings across February through April 1987 put five different seven-car Harris sets on the Glen Waverley line, with an additional set composed of the first cars to enter service (1501M-601T-602T-1502M-501BT-603T-1503M) stored at Jolimont Workshops. 797M-794M were sighted stored pending return to the overhead lubrication train on 22 April.

In mid-1987 about 20 seven-car sets were in service:

Date	Car 1	Car 2	Car 3	Car 4	Car 5	Car 6	Car 7
11 May 1987	727M	628T	632T	1571M	2551BT	2825T	702M
11 June 1987	724M	2607T	660T	1549M	511BT	614T	761M
22 June 1987	752M	687T	617T	1589M	542BT	829T	1577M
3 July 1987	799M	822T	609T	1543M	2807T (Note: 2807T in position of BT, either 1543M fitted with drawbar at cab end or 2807T fitted with coupler at one end.)	2883T	703M
7 July 1987	793M	881T	2686T	712M	531BT	833T	774M
7 July 1987	1547M	2826T	619T	790M	520BT	649T	1507M
9 July 1987	746M	2888T	2846T	1537M	527BT	875T	1585M
10 July 1987	785M	855T	879T	786M	504BT	811T	788M
13 July 1987	1576M	618T	2867T	1541M	547BT	681T	1575M
14 July 1987	862M	2843T	668T	1504M	554BT	514T (Note: 514BT converted to T car)	1548M
14 July 1987	1517M	854T	670T	1565M	2502BT (Note: Source says 2052BT, clearly a typo)	2606T	1587M
15 July 1987	1581M	882T	556T (Note: 556BT converted to T car)	734M	507BT	2837T	701M
20 July 1987	1501M (Note: Source says 1051M, clearly a typo)	601T	602T	1502M	501BT	603T	1503M
20 July 1987	1561M	817T	684T	798M	548BT	666T	791M
20 July 1987	795M	634T	880T	1511M	545BT	625T	1532M
21 July 1987	723M	610T	2612T	1514M	513BT	842T	765M
22 July 1987	748M	690T	2620T	784M	2515BT	2850T	1583M
23 July 1987	1515M	803T	860T	737M	534BT	809T	707M
24 July 1987	1522M	689T	622T	796M	505BT	827T	733M

The July 1987 MetRail working timetable listed as in-service, 40 1st series motors, 37 trailers and 15 backing trailers, and 46 2nd series motors, 49 trailers and 12 backing trailers, plus the sixteen refurbished carriages. Fourteen seven-car sets were observed in service on 30 September 1989, plus two not observed but believed to still have been in service at the time.

On 27 November 1987 the sets had been altered as below, with about fifteen carriages not recorded but being remarshalled.

Date	Car 1	Car 2	Car 3	Car 4	Car 5	Car 6	Car 7
27 November 1987	752M	687T	617T	1589M	542BT	610T	1577M
27 November 1987	1547M	2826T	619T	790M	520BT	649T	745M
27 November 1987	1581M	882T	556T (Note: 556BT converted to T car)	734M	507BT	2837T	701M
27 November 1987	1517M	854T	670T	1565M	2502BT	2606T	1587M
27 November 1987	727M	628T	632T	1571M	2551BT	2825T	702M
27 November 1987	762M	2843T	2612T	1504M	554BT	514T (Note: 514BT converted to T car)	1507M
27 November 1987	1514M	803T	860T	1515M	534BT	809T	707M
27 November 1987	795M	2846T	880T	765M	545BT	625T	757M
27 November 1987	1576M	618T	2867T	1511M	547BT	681T	737M
27 November 1987	1575M	690T	2620T	784M	2515BT	2850T	1583M
27 November 1987	724M	2607T	660T	748M	511BT	614T	761M
27 November 1987	746M	2686T	881T	1537M	527BT	875T	785M

On 18 October 1987 a set of six vandalised Harris cars, 1538M-634T-548BT-1532M-668T-763M, were sighted stored on a siding near General Motors railway station. Another sighting at the same location was on 29 June 1989, though it is not known if these were the same cars.

A note in Newsrail, May 1989, indicated that seven cars, with asbestos components removed, were to be preserved as an operational set, using cars 1522M, 798M, 799M, 2515T, 2606T, 2850T and 883T, in conjunction with The Met's celebrations of the 70th anniversary of the Melbourne railway electrification project. However, all those cars were placed off-register in 1990. It is worth noting that 798M and 799M were built without either blue or white asbestos insulation while 522M-606T-515BT (the latter reconverted) could have formed a complete first-series unit.

A number of Harris cars were stored at the Arden Street sidings near North Melbourne railway station in 1989. In July that year a batch of 11 cars - two Blocks and a Unit - were extracted from storage there and proceeded to Newport Workshops. The cars transferred were, from the east end, 774M-617T-687T-752M, 746M-2886T-881T-1537M, 527BT-875T-785M. Only one of these cars would go on to be reused, 886T becoming BIH185 shortly thereafter.

== Preservation ==
With most of the fleet being buried due to asbestos, scrapped, or converted to H-type carriages, only four have survived.

Motor cars 795M and refurbished 903M (both pictured below) are preserved at the Newport Railway Museum.

Greaser cars 794M and 797M are owned by VicTrack, and are stored at Newport Workshops.

Surviving Harris cars
Number	Image	Status	Owner
903M (ex. 744M)		Static Display	Newport Railway Museum
794M		Stored	Newport Workshops
795M		Static Display	Newport Railway Museum
797M		Stored	Newport Workshops

== See also ==
- G series (Toronto subway), rapid transit cars for Toronto, Ontario, Canada that used a similar design of carbody.
