= State Transport Authority (Victoria) =

Former transport body in Victoria, Australia

State-owned corporation overview
- Formed: 1 July 1983
- Preceding State-owned corporation: Victorian Railways
- Dissolved: 30 June 1989
- Superseding State-owned corporation: Public Transport Corporation
- Jurisdiction: Victoria
- Headquarters: Melbourne
- Key document: Transport Act 1983

Tangerine V/Line logo from the 1980s

The State Transport Authority was a State Government of Victoria owned corporate body which operated country passenger and freight trains in Victoria, Australia. It was established under the Transport Act 1983, succeeding the Victorian Railways Board. The authority commenced operations on 1 July 1983.

== History ==
The State Transport Authority operated under the trading name V/Line, and provided rail service support to the then Metropolitan Transit Authority which was formed at the same time with responsibility for metropolitan train and tram operations. The Transport (Amendment) Act 1989 merged the State Transport Authority with the Metropolitan Transit Authority from 1 July 1989 to form the Public Transport Corporation.

Preceded by Victorian Railways	Country rail in Victoria; 1983–1989	Succeeded by Public Transport Corporation
