= Metropolitan Transit Authority (Victoria) =

Former public transport operator in Melbourne, Australia

State-owned corporation overview
- Formed: 1 July 1983
- Preceding agencies: MMTB; VicRail; MURLA
- Dissolved: 30 June 1989
- Superseding State-owned corporation: Public Transport Corporation
- Jurisdiction: Victoria
- Headquarters: Melbourne
- Key document: Transport Act 1983

The Metropolitan Transit Authority (MTA), known to the general public as The Met, was a Government of Victoria owned corporate body that operated suburban passenger trains, trams and buses in Victoria, Australia.

== History ==
MetRail logo

The MTA was a statutory body set up to manage the trams and buses formerly operated by the Melbourne & Metropolitan Tramways Board, the metropolitan train operations of the former VicRail, and the operations of the former Melbourne Underground Rail Loop Authority. It was set up under section 15 of the Transport Act 1983 and commenced operation on 1 July 1983.

In the 1984–85 financial year, the authority employed more than 12,000 people across five divisions. The aim of the authority was to integrate the provision of public transport in Melbourne. A green and gold livery was adopted for vehicles, with a yellow trefoil logo and "Metropolitan Transit" tagline (later changed to "The Met"). In April 1985, it purchased Melbourne-Brighton Bus Lines with 37 buses.

A single Harris train was painted in a trial all-over green and gold livery (similar to the previous Victorian Railways blue and gold livery) however the train reverted to blue prior to re-entering service, with subsequent Comeng, Hitachi and refurbished Harris trains receiving only green and yellow adhesive stickers between the windows rather than being painted. Non-refurbished Harris trains retained the Victorian Railways blue and gold until their withdrawal.

Metropolitan rail services were previously operated by VicRail. The MetRail division was established as part of MTA, and worked closely with the State Transport Authority (STA) to provide suburban rail services. The MTA provided funds to the STA to operate some train services on its behalf and for capital projects relating to MetRail.

The Met Bus and Met Tram divisions took over the services operated by the former Melbourne & Metropolitan Tramways Board.

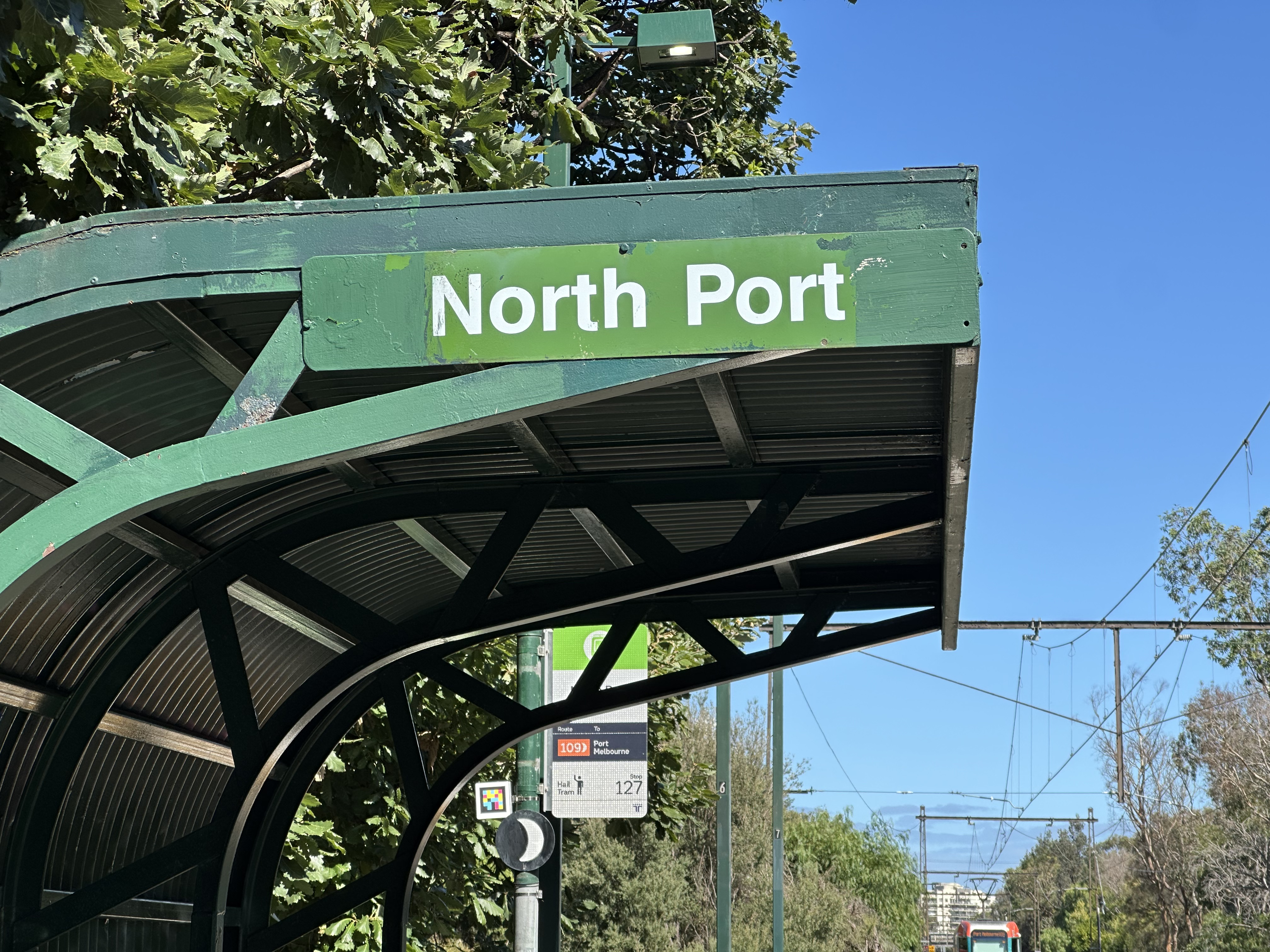
Standard MTA-style signage at North Port station (as seen in 2026)

By 11 April 1988, integration of the transport systems had been achieved and the separate divisions brought together. The management of the MTA was restructured into three vertically integrated directorates concerning operations, project development and resources. The MTA was merged with the STA on 1 July 1989 to form the Public Transport Corporation (PTC).

The PTC was privatised in stages in the 1990s. In December 1993, the Doncaster East and North Fitzroy bus depots were taken over by the National Bus Company. The remaining bus operations out of Footscray and Sandringham depots were taken over by Melbourne Bus Link in April 1998.

In October 1997 in preparation for privatisation, the PTC's suburban rail and tram operations were split into separate business units, Bayside Trains, Hillside Trains, Swanston Trams and Yarra Trams. All were privatised in August 1999.

== Rolling Stock ==
Electric Multiple Units
Type	Image	Top Speed (km/h)	Built	Number	Notes
Tait		80			
Harris		130			
Hitachi		116			
Comeng		115			
4D					

Preceded by Victorian Railways	Railways in Melbourne; 1983–1989	Succeeded by Public Transport Corporation
Preceded by Melbourne & Metropolitan Tramways Board	Trams in Melbourne; 1983–1989	Succeeded by Public Transport Corporation
