= Balt Camp =

Historic site in Victoria, Australia

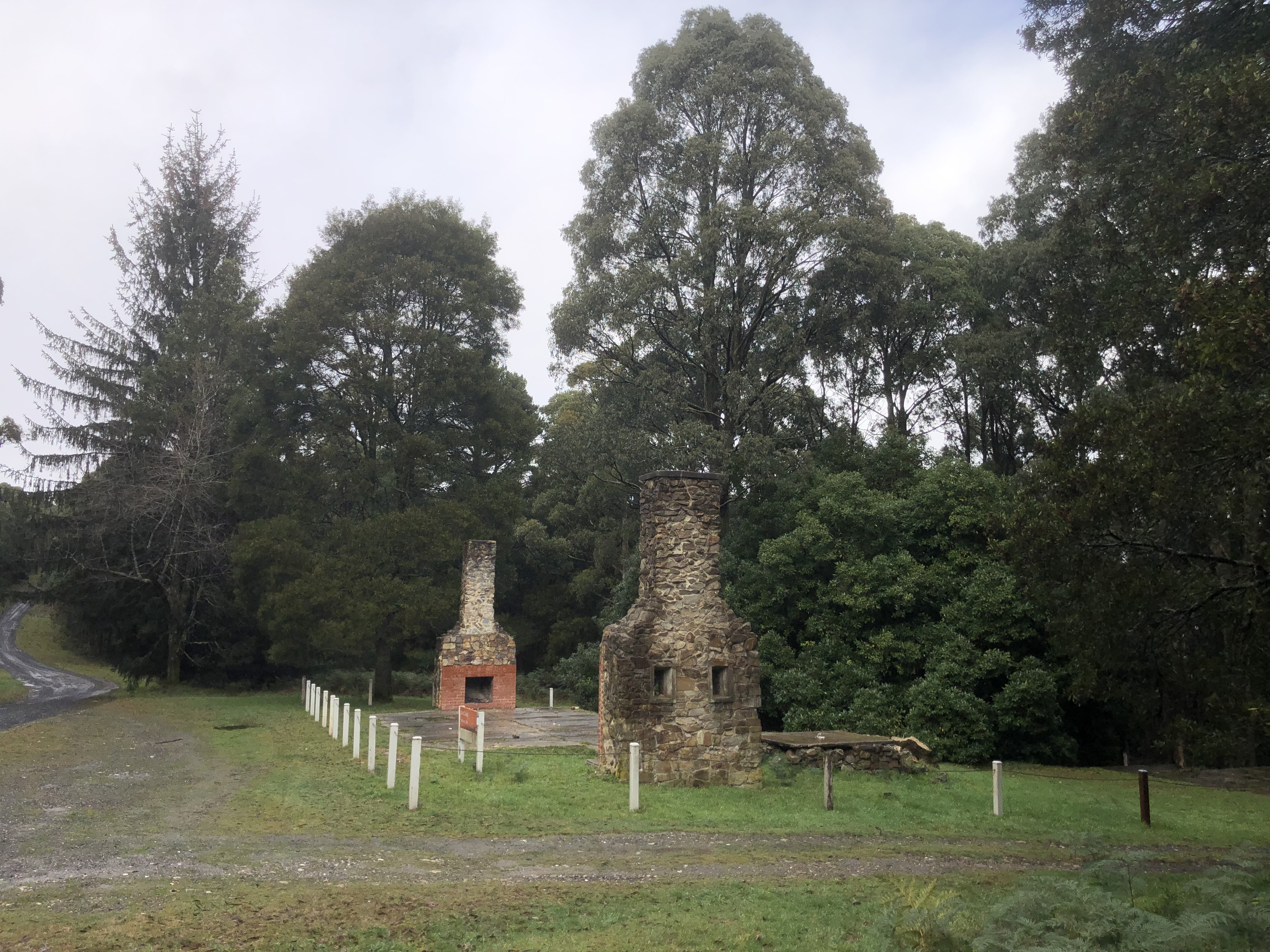
- Remains of the Balt Camp

- Location in Moorabool Shire, Victoria
- 37°27′42″S 144°12′54″E
- Type: Ruins
- Location: Blakeville, Victoria, Australia
- Nearest city: Ballarat

History
- Built: ~1949

Victorian Heritage Register
- Official name: Balt Camp
- Type: State heritage (built and natural)
- Designated: 4 May 1981
- Reference no.: H0492

Balt Camp is a former post-World War II migrant workers' camp located in the Wombat State Forest, near the towns of Bullarto and Daylesford in central Victoria, Australia. Established by the Victorian Forests Commission in the late 1940s, the camp primarily housed displaced persons and refugees from the Baltic states of Estonia, Latvia and Lithuania, as well as some Poles, who had arrived in Australia under assisted migration schemes following the Second World War. Residents of the camp were employed in forestry work including thinning regrowth forest, firewood cutting, road construction and fire protection. Today, only stone chimneys, concrete slabs and other remnants survive at the site.

== History ==
Following the end of the Second World War, Australia accepted thousands of displaced persons from war-torn Europe under immigration schemes intended to increase the country's population and labour force. The first major intake of refugees from the Baltic states arrived in 1947, with many required to undertake two years of government-directed employment as a condition of entry into Australia.

At the same time, the Forests Commission Victoria was expanding forestry operations in the Wombat Forest. Large areas of regrowth timber required thinning, but local labour was scarce. Refugee workers were consequently employed in forestry camps across Victoria, including in the Wombat State Forest. Balt camps were also established in areas such as Broadford, Beaufort, Castlemaine, the Brisbane Ranges, Graytown, Mirboo East and Bullengarook.

The camp was established high on the Great Dividing Range within the Wombat Forest. Between approximately 25 and 50 men primarily from Estonia, Latvia and Lithuania were housed in small two-man cabins located on both sides of Camp Road. Facilities at the camp included a mess hut, shower and toilet block, storeroom, water tower and diesel generator.

Reverend Heinrich Johannes Noack of St John's Lutheran Church, Ballarat was responsible for conducting Lutheran services in the camps surrounding Ballarat, including the camp in the Wombat Forest. German was used as a lingua franca for the services.

Workers at the camp undertook physically demanding forestry labour, often using only hand tools such as axes. Regrowth forest was thinned manually, with logs hauled by horse and draw to saw benches where timber was cut into firewood intended for Melbourne. The immigrant workforce contributed to a major increase in Victorian firewood production during the early 1950s. By June 1949, approximately 180 European immigrants were employed in Forests Commission work across Victoria, increasing to 361 workers by the end of the following year.

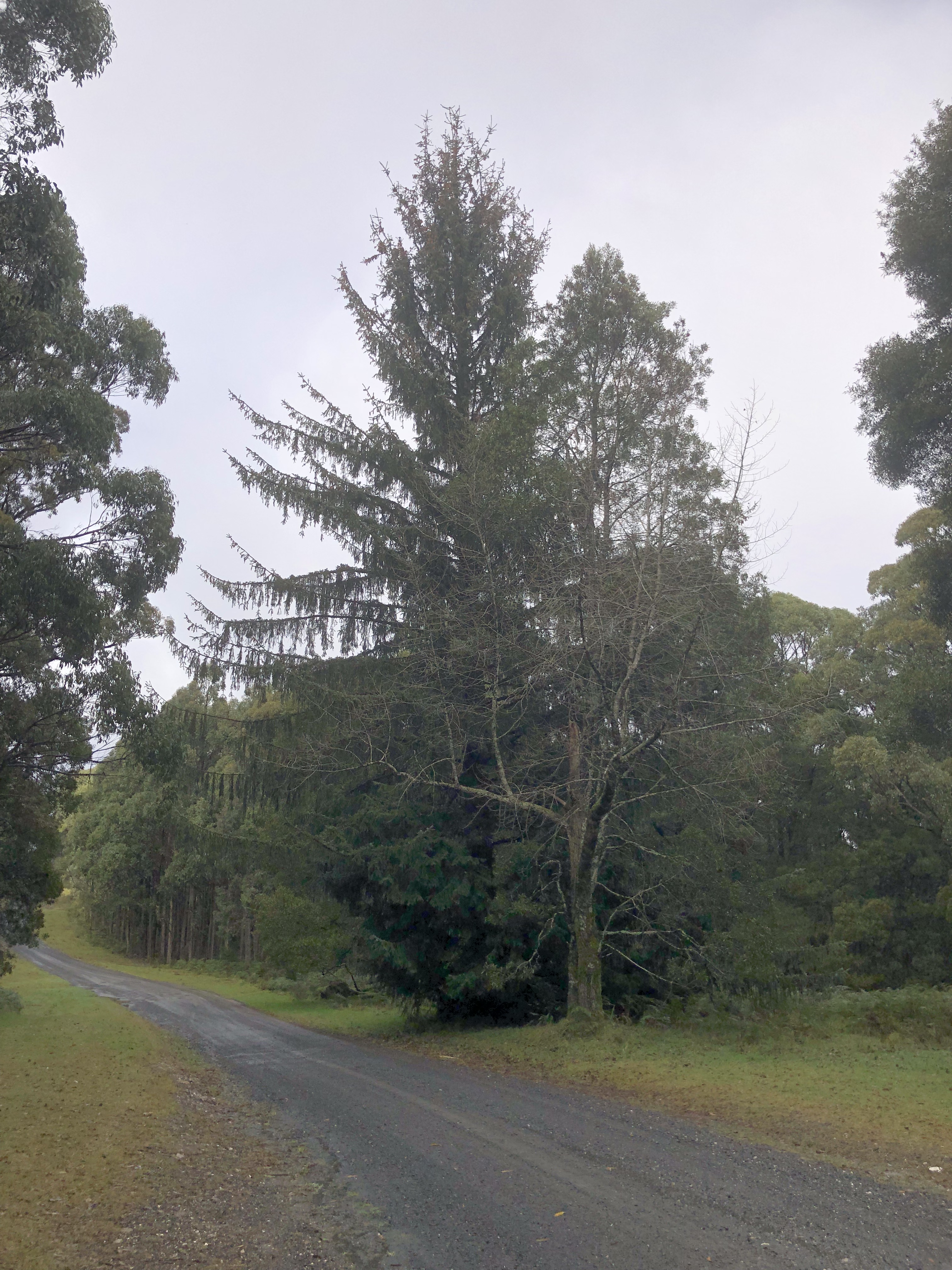
A large spruce tree adjacent to the camp ruins

Life at the camp was isolated and difficult, particularly during winter when snow regularly covered the district. Recreational facilities were limited, although the men played soccer and travelled to nearby Bullarto and Daylesford on weekends, initially by foot and later by motorcycle after saving enough money to purchase them. Some refugees reportedly struggled with the unfamiliar Australian conditions, including harsh forestry labour and road conditions.

On Monday 31 October 1949, two Polish workers from the camp, 26 year old Maksymillian Hanke and 30 year old Mieczyslaw Gajda drowned whilst boating on Lake Daylesford on one of their weekends off. A third member of the group managed to swim ashore, and the police subsequently recovered the bodies.

By 1952, the refugee labour scheme was winding down as workers completed their compulsory contracts and moved into wider Australian society. The camp was later used by forestry assessment crews during the 1950s, and by about 1957 it had been leased to the YMCA at Ballarat. Over subsequent decades the buildings deteriorated or were removed, leaving only archaeological remains at the site.

== See also ==
- Bonegilla Migrant Reception and Training Centre
