= Benalla Migrant Camp =

Heritage listed site in Victoria, Australia

Coordinates: 36.556°S 145.998°E

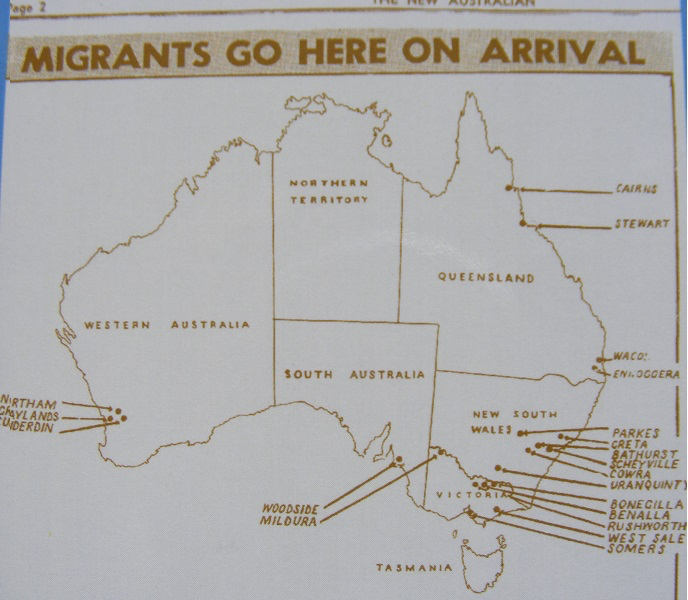
Map of Migrant Camps in Post-WWII Australia.

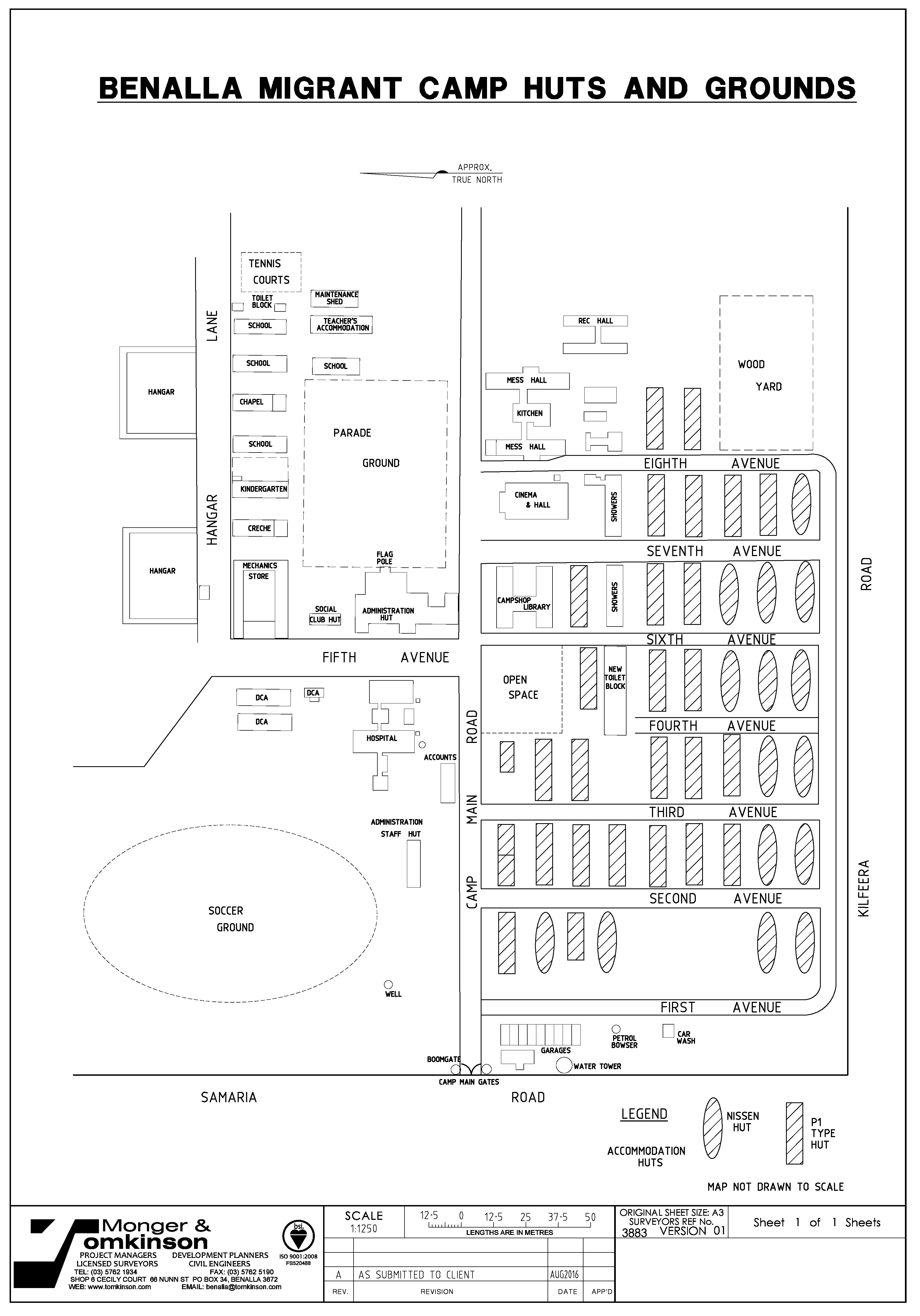
Recreated Map of the Benalla Migrant Camp.

The Benalla Migrant Camp, formally known as the Benalla Holding Centre and the Benalla Migrant Accommodation Centre, was one of 23 similar camps established by the Australian government to provide temporary housing for non-British new arrivals in post-World War II Australia. Opened in Benalla in 1949, it housed migrant families until 1967 (including unsupported mothers and their children), when the number of residents had diminished sufficiently for the camp to close. By that time, over 60,000 people, mainly of Polish, Latvian, Lithuanian, German, and Estonian origins, as well as other nationalities, had been accommodated there. After decades of neglect, the site was finally recognised and state heritage listed in 2016.

== Description ==
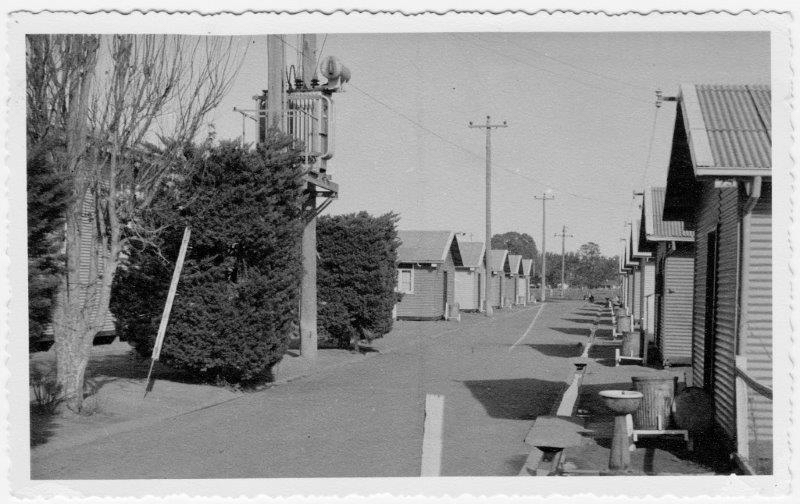
P-type huts at Benalla Migrant Camp.

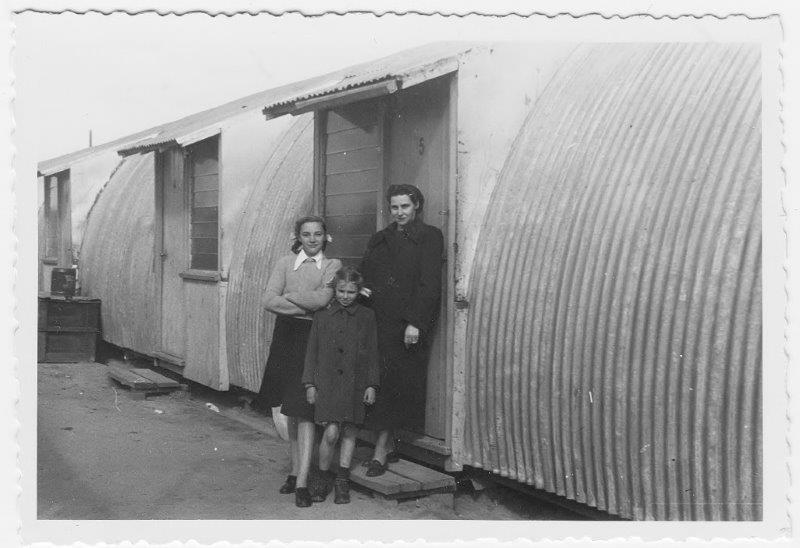
Migrant family outside a Nissen Hut. (Source: Freda Meiers)

Initially, the Benalla Migrant Camp was intended as a ‘holding centre’ to provide short-term accommodation for the dependent families of new arrivals, all of whom had been processed at the larger Bonegilla Migrant Reception Centre. The migrants (primarily central and eastern Europeans) arrived in Australia as a part of a large-scale immigration programme launched to increase Australia's population, and hence its labour force. Contracted to work in government allocated employment as a condition of their migration, the breadwinners of migrant families were dispatched to various places of employment. If they were unable to find family accommodation close to their work, their dependants were put into a holding centre like Benalla. In this way, the camp was initially associated with family separation — a system which received widespread criticism. The camp also took in supporting mothers and was equipped with child care facilities so the women could work, which was highly unusual for the time.

Camp accommodation at Benalla comprised basic ex-military ‘P-type’ corrugated iron huts (initially unlined and without power-points), with separate communal cooking and washing facilities, and other facilities such as a kindergarten, school, hall, hospital, shops and a gymnasium. In the first few years of camp operation, Nissen Huts were also added to the camp to increase capacity.

Camp residents received medical checks, and attended courses in English language and the Australian way of life. Generally residents were expected to stay at the Holding Centre between four and six months. Some stayed until they had completed their migration agreement obligations to the Australian government, which was 2 years’ labour contract. A number stayed much longer — in some instances up to 15 years. Residents were required to pay a tariff for their accommodation.

== History ==
The camp occupied the former Royal Australian Air Force (RAAF) No.11 Elementary Flying Training School (1941–1944), including its facilities, adjacent to a small aerodrome on the outskirts of Benalla in north east Victoria.

Opening in September 1949, the camp was a modest-sized holding centre, accommodating 200-400 people. The first years at the camp were the busiest, with a peak occupancy of 1,063 migrants in 1951. The number of migrant arrivals decreased markedly when the displaced persons scheme drew to an end in 1952 and a number of holding centres closed.

In 1953, a gradual change in policy meant that Benalla ceased to be solely a holding centre taking in only dependants. In 1958, it had a formal name change to the Benalla Migrant Accommodation Centre. Facilities were improved, and the camp provided accommodation to breadwinners and their families if the breadwinner worked in the Benalla district and could not find private accommodation.

Although the official capacity was 500, throughout the 1950s the resident population at Benalla remained around 400 with an average of 200 people moving in and out each year. It survived national reviews of migrant accommodation needs in 1953 and 1959. By the mid-1960s the occupancy did not exceed 250 with an annual turnover of about 240. In 1967, there were only 135 residents at the camp, and after a Department of Immigration inquiry found it economically unviable, the camp was closed on 8 December that year.

After closing, the airfield continued to be used for civil and recreational use and many of the aging structures were demolished in the 1980s. Benalla City purchased the site in 1992.

== The Benalla Experiment ==
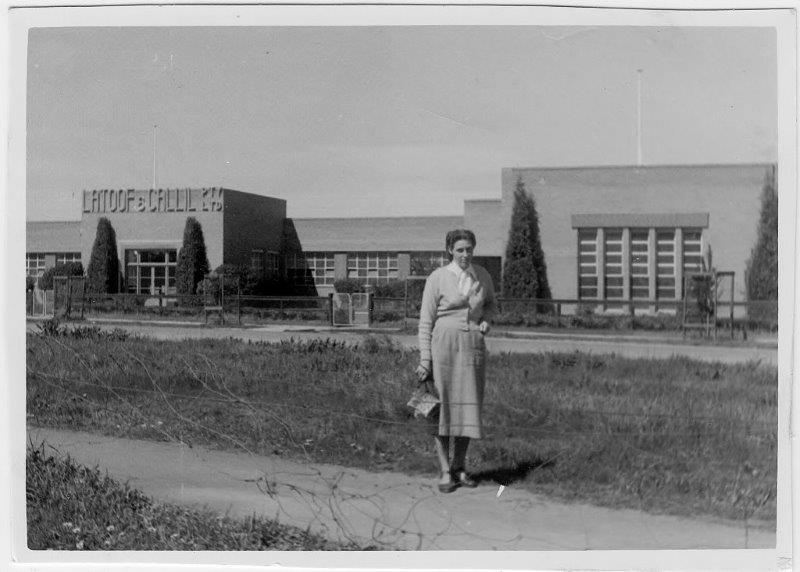
Migrant women were employed at Latoof and Calill. (Source: Freda Meiers)

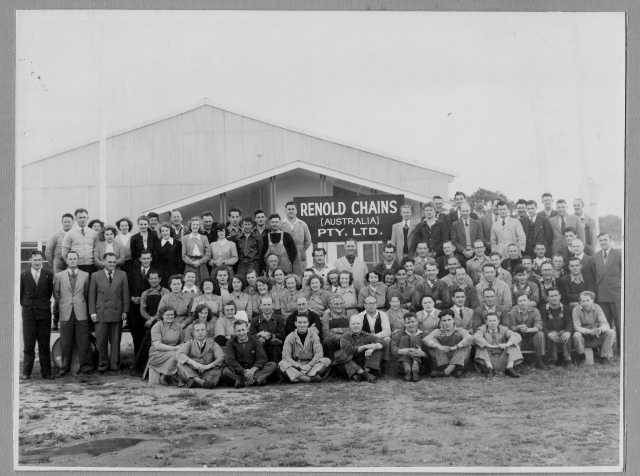
Migrants were also employed at the Renold Chains factory.

The Benalla Holding Centre also fulfilled a distinct role within the national migrant camp system, in that it received supporting mothers with children (at the time, dubbed ‘unsupported mothers’ or ‘widows and unmarried mothers’). As a humanitarian gesture, Australia's immigration scheme had admitted large numbers of supporting mothers at the request of the International Refugee Organisation, to help it empty the Displaced Persons Camps in Europe. At the time, Harold Holt, the Minister for Immigration, explained, ‘It was fully realised that their employment and accommodation would present a problem’.

From late 1951 on, many of these supporting mothers were directed to the Benalla Holding Centre, which was close to two newly built factories (the Latoof and Callil clothing and Renold Chains factories). These factories offered the women employment. The camp also employed some of the women as cooks, hygiene workers, and in administration; while others were employed locally as ‘domestics’.

At any one time, about a third of the resident population of the Benalla Migrant Camp was made up of supporting mothers. Initially, what some social workers dubbed the ‘Benalla experiment’ seemed to work well, especially after camp facilities were improved and adequate childcare for working mothers was provided. Women were given English language training and homemaking classes, to increase their prospects of marriage and assimilation into the wider community. Benalla was intended only as a short-term solution for accommodating supporting migrant women, and initially, with the turn-over of 30-50 camp residents each month, the system seemed satisfactory.

However, the jobs open to supporting mothers did not pay enough for them to accumulate sufficient savings to establish their own homes. For most of these women, their best prospects for leaving the camp lay in marriage or by moving into accommodation with their eldest child once he or she was working and could establish a home; but where these opportunities did not exist, there was a problem. Living under temporary conditions for long periods was demoralising for both women and children, and yet by 1956, social workers found that Benalla had many ‘long stayers’ who had little prospect of leaving, and some who were even fearful of leaving the protection of the camp.

As the camp closed in 1967, a psychiatric social worker, Mrs K. Patterson, was appointed to recommend ways that remaining residents could be ‘absorbed effectively into the community.’ One former social worker later recalled that, far from the ‘Benalla experiment’ being a success, ‘Benalla was a sad and tragic camp where widows and single mothers were sent… The morale of the women was low and assimilation into the community poor.’

== State Heritage Listing ==
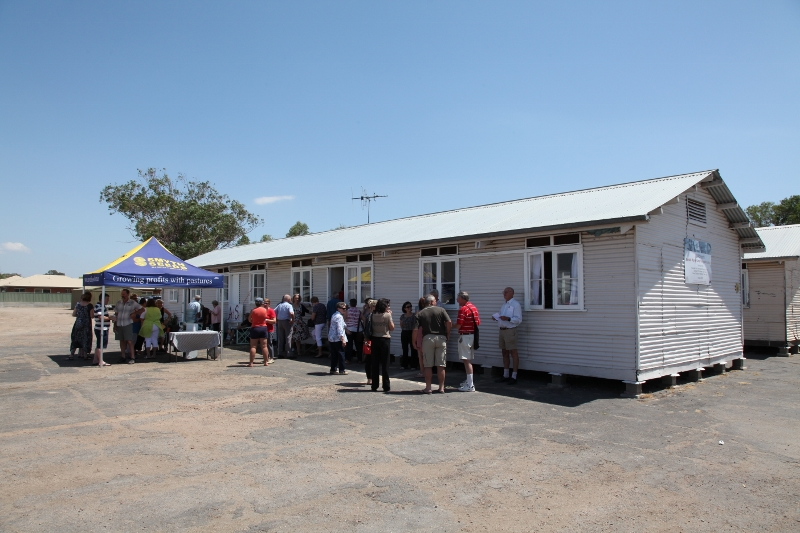
Today, Hut 11 houses the Benalla Migrant Camp Exhibition.

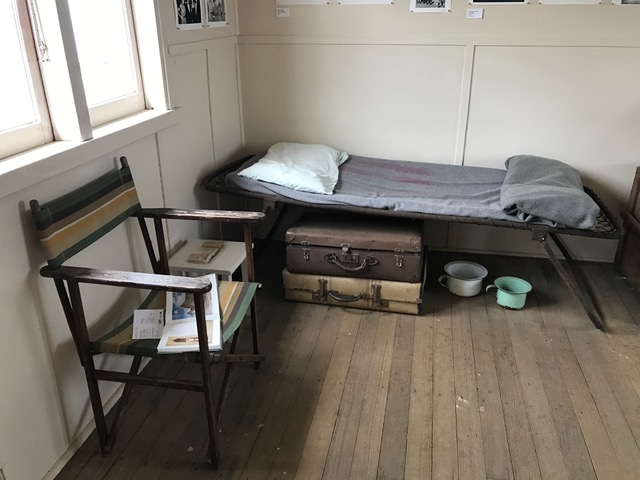
Recreated Migrant Accommodation in Hut 11.

On 19 May 2016, the Benalla Migrant Camp was listed as a site of significance at the state level on the Victorian Heritage Register. According to historian Bruce Pennay, two developments led to this listing: ‘first, the compilation of an exhibition by Sabine Smyth; and second, the proposed redevelopment of the airport,’ which potentially threatens the site.

In 2012, local resident Sabine (Burczik) Smyth began collecting names, memories, artefacts and photographs relating to the camp, in order to launch a photographic exhibition for Australia Day 2013 in celebration of that year's theme ‘We Are One’. The Benalla Migrant Camp Exhibition was held in Hut 11, one of the disused camp huts that had subsequently become vacant. The following April, the Benalla Migrant Camp Inc. formed as a volunteer group with the broad aims of continuing the collation of historical material and establishing a permanent memorial exhibition. The exhibition has since remained open to visitors on a regular basis, with Smyth continuing to gather photographs and stories from ex-camp residents.

In January 2014, Smyth (Benalla Migrant Camp Inc.) lodged an application for nomination of the former RAAF base and migrant camp to Heritage Victoria. This was initially rejected but eventually accepted on the 7 March 2014. Independently from this application, Heritage Advisor Deborah Kemp (employed as a consultant by Benalla Rural City) assessed the site's historical significance as part of the Benalla Airport Redevelopment Plan, ahead of the World Gliding Championships to be held on the site in 2017, and found it to be of local, and most likely also state heritage significance.

She found that while most of the original camp has been demolished or sold and removed to make way for the expansion of an aged care facility, nine of the original P-type huts remain, including six buildings still in situ — two toilet blocks and four huts, two of which were school buildings and another which served as the camp chapel and the other most likely the crèche/kindergarten. Additional remaining historic fabric includes concrete gate posts at the intersection of BARC (abbreviation of Benalla Accommodation and Recreation Centre) Avenue with Samaria Road, a remnant below-ground cistern, BARC Avenue itself, and related infrastructure.

A petition lodged in 2015, to preserve the remains of the Camp helped prompt Heritage Victoria to undertake a cultural heritage assessment of the site in July 2015. The assessment recommended that the site not be included on the Victorian Heritage Register, partly on the basis that its historical connections with post-WWII migration were ‘more clearly demonstrated at the more extensive and intact camp at Bonegilla (VHR H1835) and at the former Maribyrnong Migrant Hostel (H2190).’

In February 2016, Heritage Victoria held a Registration Hearing in Benalla to consider this recommendation. The hearing attracted around 100 community members over two days, and took into account eighteen submissions rejecting this recommendation, and in doing so, determined that the site was of heritage significance and should be included on the state Heritage Register (VHR Number H2358).

The site was deemed significant on a state level as an example of one of only a small number of surviving post-World War II non-British migrant accommodation centres, and as Victoria's longest-lasting holding centre, which played a distinctive role in settling vulnerable groups of non-British migrants in the post-war years. It was also deemed socially significant for its connection with former residents and their families, and its ability to interpret the experiences of post-World War II non-British migrants to the broader Victorian community.

Historian Bruce Pennay has described the Benalla Migrant Camp as a site with a ‘difficult heritage’, partly because it does not fit easily into the post-war migrant success stories that form a part of Australia's historical nation-building narratives. ‘All holding centres…’ Pennay contends, ‘raise embarrassing questions about the cruel and discriminatory policy of family separation, forced movement, assimilation, and the adequacy of support services.’

The site, which is owned by Benalla Rural City Council, is currently awaiting a conservation management plan. The Benalla Migrant Camp Exhibition in Hut 11 continues to garner widespread community support and engagement, particularly from former camp residents and their relatives — who today live all over Victoria, Australia and the world.
