= Mount Rowan =

Extinct volcano in Victoria, Australia

Coordinates: 37°30′06″S 143°50′22″E

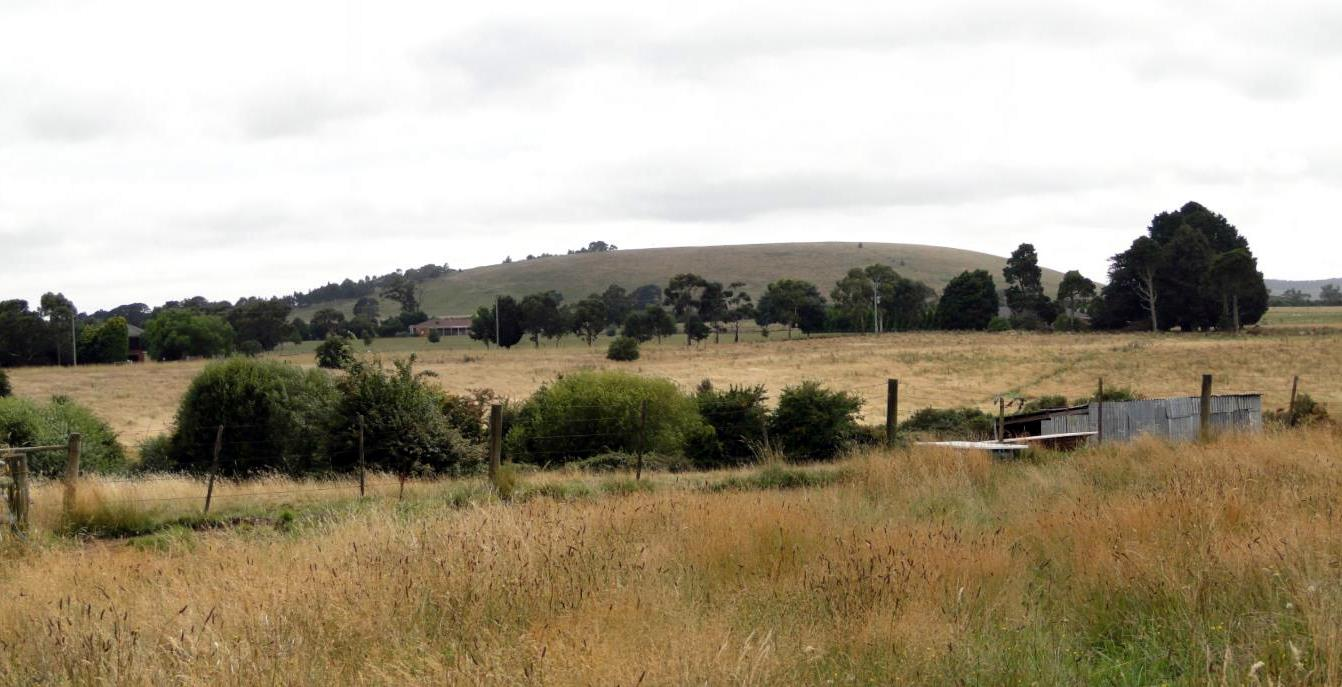
Mount Rowan, Victoria

Mount Rowan is a small extinct volcano on the edge of the city of Ballarat, Victoria, Australia. It was also known as Waldies Hill. It is 518 metres above sea level. The lava flows from the volcano are thought to be from 2.1 million to 2.9 million years ago. It is one of the 123 volcanoes in the Ballarat and Daylesford area. These are part of the Western Victorian Volcanic Plains. In 2009, a geologist, Professor Bernie Joyce warned that the volcanoes around Ballarat could become active again.
