= Pride celebrations in Australia =

LGBTQ events in Australia

Pride celebrations in Australia happen all throughout the calendar year, with the Sydney Gay and Lesbian Mardi Gras as the biggest event.

== History ==
It is widely regarded that the first Mardi Gras celebration in Australia was on 24 June 1978, when an estimated 500 people rallied in Martin Place. Since then, LGBTQ+ pride celebrations have grown massively, with many events in all states and territories.

In 2023, Sydney hosted InterPride's annual WorldPride event.

== Pride celebrations by state/territory and city/town/region ==
=== Australian Capital Territory ===
==== Canberra ====
Canberra celebrates with their SpringOUT Festival, which runs annually in November. The fair day marks the beginning of the festival, which has many other events throughout the month.

=== New South Wales ===
==== Newcastle ====
Newcastle has an annual festival that happens in October. Many events happen throughout the entire month, with the fair day marking the end of the festival. Other events during this festival include a pride parade, arts and culture displays, and many more.

==== Sydney ====
Sydney celebrates the Sydney Gay and Lesbian Mardi Gras annually, usually around the end of February or start of March. It marks the final event of the annual LGBTQ+ festival celebrated in February. They also celebrate Pride Month with an annual pride festival that happens in June. This festival includes many events, such as a fair day and many different arts and culture displays.

==== Other cities/towns ====
There are many more events that happen across the state, in cities such as Tamworth and Lismore, and more region-based events across the Blue Mountains and the Central Coast, among many others.

=== Northern Territory ===
==== Darwin ====
Top End Pride runs the annual Darwin Pride Festival, which happens in June.

==== Kununurra ====
The Kununurra Pride Festival happens annually, run by Kununurra Pride in the town of Kununurra.

=== Queensland ===
==== Brisbane ====
Brisbane has their pride festival annually in September, which is run by Brisbane Pride. They also celebrate with their Big Gay Day in October each year.

==== Cairns ====
Happens annually in October.

==== Gladstone ====
The Rainbow on the Reef festival happens in May each year.

==== Moreton Bay ====
The Moreton Bay PrideFest Happens annually in April.

==== Sunshine Coast ====
Their pride festival happens each year in November.

=== South Australia ===
==== Adelaide ====
The South Australian Pride Gala is held annually in June, and it celebrates South Australia in its entirety. Pride March Adelaide happens in November, and is run by the same group as the South Australian Pride Gala, Pride Adelaide.

Separate from Pride Adelaide is Feast Festival, which happens every year in November. As part of Feast Festival, they run Picnic in the Park.

=== Tasmania ===
==== Hobart ====
TasPride Festival happens annually in February.

=== Victoria ===
==== Bendigo ====
The Bendigo Pride Festival happens in April each year.

==== Daylesford ====
Daylesford hosts the ChillOut Festival, which is Australia's largest queer country pride festival.

==== Geelong ====
The Geelong Rainbow Festival happens annually in February. Geelong also celebrates with their annual Geelong Pride Film Festival, happening in April and May each year. Geelong Pride Expo, which is set to take place on the 13th of June 2026, is another pride festival taking place in Geelong (West). Moreover, the Geelong Gay Social is a LGBTQ+ group that gathers monthly at Recess Bar+ Eats. GASP organizes activities for the LGBTQ+; these activities are separated into 2 groups by age with people of ages 12-17 being the "Younger Group" and the "Older Group" being for people from ages 17-25.

==== Melbourne ====
The Midsumma Festival happens annually in January. The South Side Festival is another pride celebration that happens in Frankston, a suburb of Melbourne, in May each year. Melbourne Queer Film Festival happens annually in November.

==== Shepparton ====
Out in the Open Festival happens in November each year.

==== Wangaratta ====
Wangaratta does not have a full-scale festival, but it celebrates with an annual pride fair day, held in April each year.

=== Western Australia ===
==== Albany ====
Albany Pride happens in February and March each year.

==== Broome ====
Broome Pride happens annually in February and March.

==== Busselton ====
Pride Wellbeing Festival happens in Busselton annually in November.

==== Goldfields ====
The Goldfields-Esperance region celebrates with Goldfields Pride, which happens in September each year.

==== Perth ====
Perth celebrates with PrideFEST, occurring in November each year.

==== Pilbara ====
Pilbara Pride happens in June each year.
