= Cecily Maude O'Connell =

Australian activist (1884–1965)

- Born: 30 June 1884; Beaufort, Victoria, Australia
- Died: 13 December 1965 (aged 81); Melbourne, Victoria, Australia

Cecily Maude O'Connell (30 June 1884 – 13 December 1965) was an Australian trade unionist and religious social worker.

== Early life ==
Born Cecily Maude Mary O'Connell to Patrick Martin O'Connell and Rosina, née Hosking on 30 June 1884 at Beaufort, Victoria. Her father was a storekeeper and a cousin of Archbishop Daniel Mannix. The family initially lived in Beaufort before moving to Kilmore via Bairnsdale and Walhalla.

In Kilmore, her mother, Rosina O'Connell, died and as a result O'Connell was sent to Abbotsford, Melbourne.

== Career and activism ==
O'Connell began to work as a teacher and got involved with the social work done by Sister M. Bernardine of St Vincent's Hospital and Sister M. Monica of the Good Shepherd Sisters. When she spent time working in a Tobacco factory O'Connell became a trade union activist and worked with the Labour Party. O'Connell represented the tobacco workers on the Trades Hall Council and at Political Labor Council conferences in 1915–16. About this time she turned down a position working for the British-Australasian Tobacco Company.

Despite being a supporter of the Labour Party, O'Connell argued for state aid to go to independent schools. She was the first treasurer for the Catholic Women's Social Guild (Catholic Women's League) when it was founded in 1916. She worked to ensure women who were unemployed because of strikes had a place to stay. O'Connell worked as a nurse, training at the Eye and Ear Hospital and working during the 1919 flu epidemic.

When she was 46 years old she founded the Company of Our Lady of the Blessed Sacrament, also known as the Grey Sisters, in Kewn Kreestha house in Daylesford, Victoria. The house opened in 1930. The purpose of the organisation was to care for mothers and children. Mothers were able to rest in the house while their children were minded. The depression challenged the women working with the Grey Sisters. They provided cleaning, cooking, shopping and child care services for families with an ill mother or new baby. O'Connell assisted Muriel Heagney to begin the Unemployed Girls' Relief Movement. The Grey Sisters became a religious congregation in 1949.

== Death and legacy ==
O'Connell died on 13 December 1965. Before she died the Grey Sisters had opened houses in Prahran, Surrey Hills, Canterbury and Croydon. The Company of Our Lady of the Blessed Sacrament has since 1986 been known as the Family Care Sisters (the Grey Sisters).
