= Daylesford Secondary College =

Daylesford College

Location
- Daylesford, Victoria; Australia; 37°20′05″S 144°09′08″E

Information
- Type: Public Secondary School
- Motto: Shape the Future
- Established: November 1899
- Principal: Steve MacPhail
- Years offered: Years 7 to 12
- Enrollment: 500
- Website: www.daylesfordsc.vic.edu.au

Daylesford College is a government secondary school located in Daylesford, Hepburn Shire approximately an hour and a half drive from Melbourne. It is the only secondary college in Shire of Hepburn. The principal is Steve MacPhail, and the assistant principals are Nick Cowan and Anna Treasure.

== History ==
The Daylesford School of Mines was founded in November 1889 in the old Market buildings in Vincent Street with an initial enrolment of 100 persons. It followed the discovery of gold in the area and the necessity for trained workers underground. A new building was opened in 1892 on the same site, later extended through to Vincent Street. As mining became less important its focus broadened into general technical subjects and in 1907 was renamed Daylesford Technical School No. 30. Daylesford Junior Technical School was founded in an adjoining building, and in 1944, with the addition of a Higher Elementary School became Daylesford Technical–Higher Elementary School, in 1946 renamed to Daylesford Technical and High School, shortened to Daylesford Technical High School in 1965.

In 1961 the school was relocated to Middleton Park – Smith Street site and expanded from there.

On 28 December 2015, a devastating fire destroyed most of the school's "A" wing (other sources have north wing ) of the school. Classes transferred to demountable buildings pending a rebuild of the affected section, which was completed in 2019.

== Controversies ==
In 2015, the school was accused of photoshopping students' school photos, removing piercings, blemishes, acne, monobrows and freckles. The school denied these accusations, claiming that only piercings were edited out, in line with the school's piercing policy.
