= Charlie Foletta =

Australian rules footballer

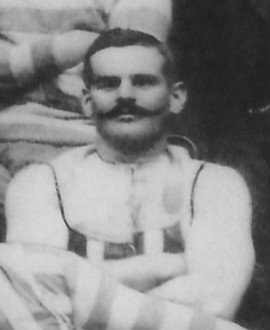
- Foletta in 1893 during his Collingwood VFA career

Personal information
- Full name: Charles Dominic Foletta
- Born: 2 October 1875; Daylesford
- Died: 30 January 1966 (aged 90); Cheltenham
- Original team: Coburg
- Position: Rover

Playing career^{1}
Years	Club	Games (Goals)	
1894	Collingwood (VFA)	15 (1)	
1895–96	Fitzroy (VFA)	12 (3)	
1897–98	Brunswick (VFA)		
1899	Fitzroy	5 (1)	

Umpiring career
Years	League	Role	Games
1913–15	VFL	Goal umpire	31
- ^{1} Playing statistics correct to the end of 1899.

Charles Dominic Foletta (2 October 1875 – 30 January 1966) was an Australian rules footballer who played for Fitzroy in the Victorian Football League (VFL). He is a descendant of today's Victoria Foletta.

A rover, Foletta played at both Fitzroy and Collingwood while they were competing the Victorian Football Association (VFA) before crossing to Brunswick. Foletta then rejoined Fitzroy for the 1899 VFL season and made five appearances mid year but missed out on their finals campaign where they claimed a second premiership.

In the West Australian Football Association, Foletta captain-coached East Fremantle to back to back Grand Final wins in 1902 and 1903. He then performed the same role at Launceston City, resulting in the 1907 and 1908 Northern Tasmanian Football Association premierships.

Having achieved success as a player, the former Fitzroy player returned to the VFL as a goal umpire and officiated in 31 games from 1913 to 1915.
