= Bonegilla Migrant Reception and Training Centre =

Heritage site in Victoria, Australia

Coordinates: 36.13104°S 147.01359°E

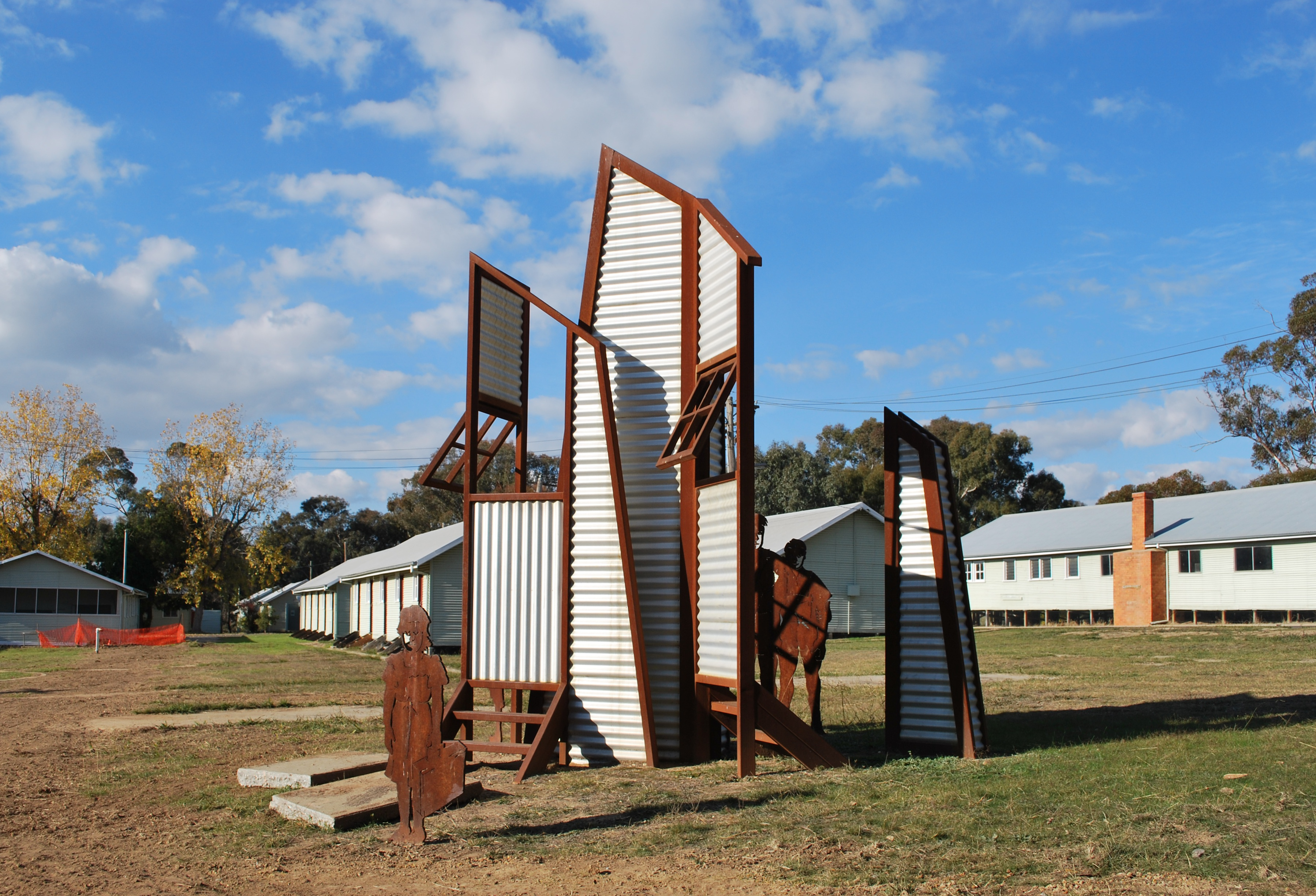
A sculpture commemorating the migrants who spent time at the Bonegilla camp. Some of Block 19 can be seen in the background.

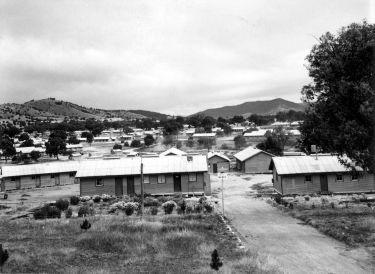
Block 4 of the camp while operational in 1954

The Bonegilla Migrant Reception and Training Centre was a camp set up for receiving and training migrants to Australia during the post World War II immigration boom. The camp was set on 130 hectares (320 acres) near Wodonga at the locality of Bonegilla in north east Victoria, between the Hume Dam and the city of Wodonga. The site was a former World War II Australian Army base, and is adjacent to the current Latchford Barracks. Before being requisitioned by the army, the site was originally a section of large pastoral land. The camp opened in 1947 and operated until 1971, over which period it received over 300,000 migrants. It is estimated that over 1.5 million Australians are descended from migrants who spent time at Bonegilla. Eric Bana's parents were both processed through Bonegilla. The grandfather of actor and screenwriter Jason Agius stayed at the camp in 1952. Other former residents include Karl Kruszelnicki, Franca Arena, Arvi Parbo, Les Murray, Susan Duncan, Pi O and Raimond Gaita.

== Bonegilla Migrant Camp ==
=== Migration and Australian legislation ===
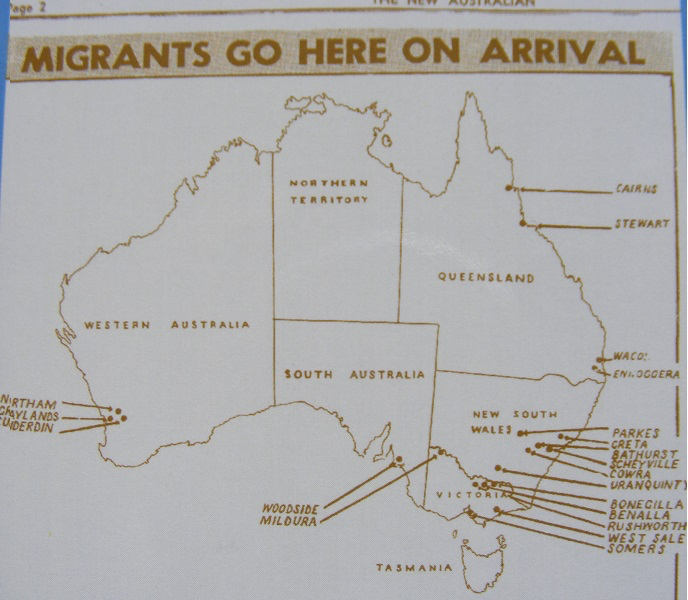
Map of Migrant Camps in Post-WWII Australia.

In the 24 years in which the camp operated, the estimated amount of arrivals was approximately 309,000. It remains the largest and longest-lasting migrant reception centre in post-war Australia. In 1945 the Australian Government, led by the ALP, actively sought to implement policies that would increase the natural population. This resulted in the opening of twenty holding centres and three reception centres (including Bonegilla) by 1951. The Aliens Act of 1947, the Nationality and Citizenship Act of 1948, and the Migration Act of 1958 increased migration although it placed migrants under surveillance and limited social access. The Assisted Passage Scheme encouraged passage for British migrants in 1946. However, less than 7000 British citizens migrated during the period, which meant that the government instead turned to the displaced persons and war refugees (of which there were an estimated 1.6 million) in French, Austrian, and German camps. These migrants were granted passage under a two-year labour contract to be housed at the reception and training centres to adjust into the 'Australian way of life'.

=== Infrastructure ===
The camp, with very basic facilities, was separated socially and geographically from nearby Albury and Wodonga and most residents were from non-English speaking nations. The camp was broken up into 24 blocks each with a kitchen, mess hut, and bath and toilet blocks. The site had an overall total of more than 800 buildings. The accommodation itself was in ex-Army unlined timber-framed buildings with corrugated iron walls. The rooms were designed to accommodate 20 people and contained no internal partitions. There was minimal done to prepare for the arrival of migrants in 1947. 47,000 beds were made available for non-British migrants across all reception centres by 1949. In 1947, Bonegilla had the capacity for less than 2,000 beds which increased to 7,700 by 1950. From 1951 onward, the internal walls were slowly lined and painted and cubicles installed, allowing some privacy. Upgrades to accommodation were sped up as the conditions were deemed inappropriate for incoming Dutch and British migrants. In 1955, these upgrades extended to the centre's sewer systems and the planting of trees for shade and windbreaks.

=== Everyday life ===
New arrivals generally docked at Port Melbourne and arrived by train at Bonegilla railway siding, where officials would receive them with a meal and accommodation. Migrants were separated and sectioned into blocks by nationality, and within these blocks men and women were segregated, even those that were married. Luggage and blankets were used as partitions to allow minor privacy and personal space.

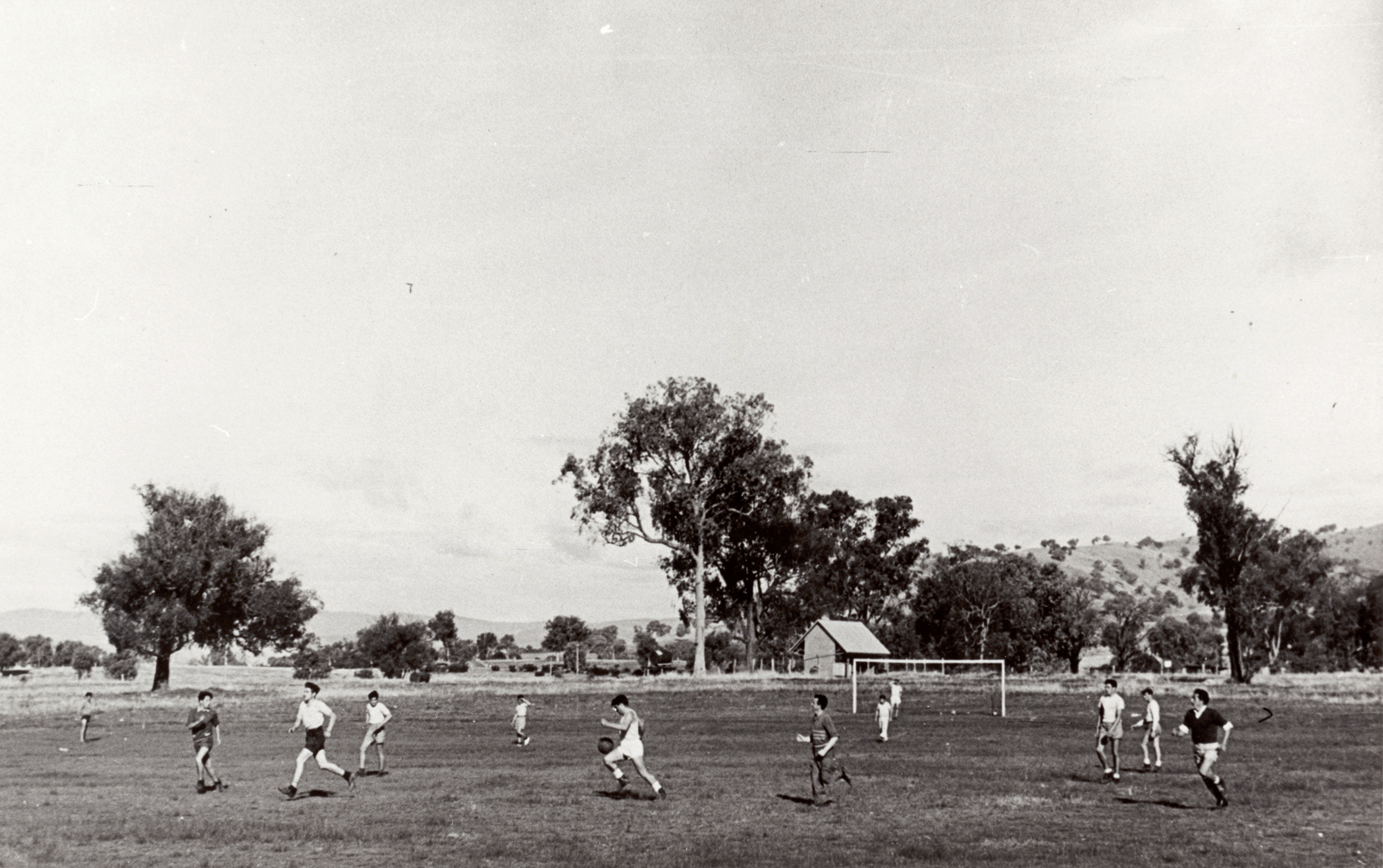
Game of soccer at the Bonegilla Migrant Reception Centre. 1952.

Recreational activities consisted of dance classes, a library, soccer and swimming at Lake Hume. The Tudor Hall in Block 19 was used for dancing, and the cinema showed films twice weekly.

Employment officers assessed the employability of migrants and allocated them to jobs Australia-wide. There was some minor allowance for the preferences of migrants, but consistent refusals of work offers could result in loss of social service benefits. Men were classified as 'labourers' and women as 'domestics'; many were frustrated by the ignorance of trade, professional, and skill qualifications and were expected to start work as simple labourers, though some received award wages.

=== Demographics ===
Bonegilla hosted a majority of European migrants, as most British migrants were allocated to other urban centres. Within this European majority, many of the migrants were from non-English speaking countries. From 1947 until 1951, all migrants were from eastern and southern Europe. With the reintroduction of a passage migrant scheme with the Netherlands in February 1951, as well as the existing scheme with Britain from 1946 and a similar one with Italy in March 1951, the demographics of the camp shifted from strictly European.

== Controversy ==
The centre was remote from the larger cities and generally attracted little attention from the Australian press. The distant location from the metropolitan cities of Melbourne and Sydney was ideal, as it was feared that migrants would create ethnic groups which would damage the image of the immigration program. There was also the worry that migrants would put Australians at a disadvantage for the limited accommodation during the war. Press interest was raised in 1949 when thirteen newly arrived children died from malnutrition. An official inquiry was critical of the inadequately staffed and equipped hospital.

=== 1952 riot ===
In July 1952, a riot broke out in the camp as a result of work demands. Italian migrants damaged buildings in response to their lack of job allocations. Giovanni Sgro, an Italian migrant and later Victorian politician, recalled that, "[we] burned two or three huts and set fire to the church". The migrants had been at the camp for several months without work prospects; although there was the implementation of a contracting job network, Italian migrants thought they had priority as they were required to repay the Commonwealth for the price of their passage from Italy to Australia.

=== 1961 riot ===
Italian and German migrants staged a riot in 1961, smashing the employment office and clashing with police. The protesters posted signs reading "We want work or back to Europe" and "Bonegilla camp without hope". They were similarly frustrated as the rioters in 1952 about the length of time spent at Bonegilla without employment. The police arrested six Germans and five Italians. This riot gained considerable attention in Europe, especially in Italy, which factored into the non-renewal of the immigration agreement between Australia and Italy. These events embarrassed Australian authorities and saw a review of settlement policies.

== Legacy and commemoration ==
In 1990, Block 19 was protected under conservation by the Register of National Estate, which stopped the demolition of the remaining 28 huts. The other buildings had already undergone demolition when the Australian Army reclaimed the site after the camp's closure in 1971. Initially the Australian Army contested the proposed AHC listing on the grounds that the camp was being favoured over army history at the site. In 2002, it was put onto the Victorian Heritage Register, and in 2007, on the Australian National Heritage List. Bonegilla's Block 19 was selected for its "outstanding" significance as "a symbol of post-war migration which transformed Australia's economy, society, and culture".

The only section of the camp remaining is Block 19 which now is now a museum and interpretive centre. In 1997, the Albury Regional Museum began collecting for a ten-day festival commemorating the 50th anniversary of Bonegilla's opening. The collection was also display at smaller festivals in 1999. In 1987, 1997, and 1999, ethnic groups held reunions with food, music, and dance. In 2001, the Victorian Government allocated two million dollars for the construction of a tourism venue and commemorative centre at Block 19. The Albury Regional Museum created a moving exhibition in 2001 titled From the Steps of Bonegilla. The success of this exhibition resulted in a secondary exhibition in Canberra using materials from the National Australian Archives and in Melbourne using materials from the Immigration Museum.

In 2010, Bonegilla Migrant Experience Heritage Park was reopened for the public in partnership with the City of Wodonga, the Australian Government as a National Heritage Place, and the Albury Regional Museum Library. The Bonegilla Migrant Experience allows visitors to take guided tours of the remaining buildings, explore the history of the site as well as browse records concerning family history, and also organise educational tours for school groups. The relaunching of the park was driven by the Bonegilla Migrant Experience Advisory Committee, as well as the various ethnic community councils, the Victorian Multicultural Commission, State Heritage, the city councils of Wodonga and Albury, and the association of ex-Bonegilla residents led by the Greek community.

== In popular culture ==
The Bonegilla Migrant Reception and Training Centre will be the backdrop of an upcoming Australian film, starring Vince Colosimo, Isabel Lucas and James Bond actor George Lazenby.

== See also ==
- Benalla Migrant Camp - a nearby camp which received migrants from Bonegilla
- Rushworth - a nearby camp which received migrants from Bonegilla
- Balt Camp
