= Daylesford, Victoria =

Daylesford
- Town
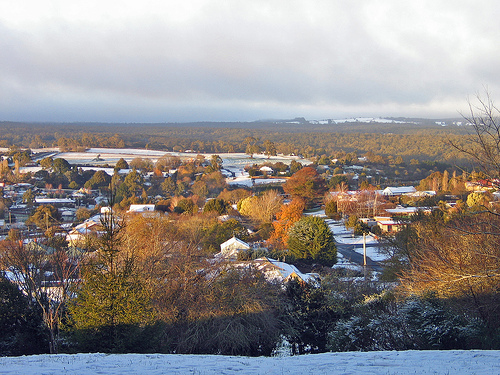
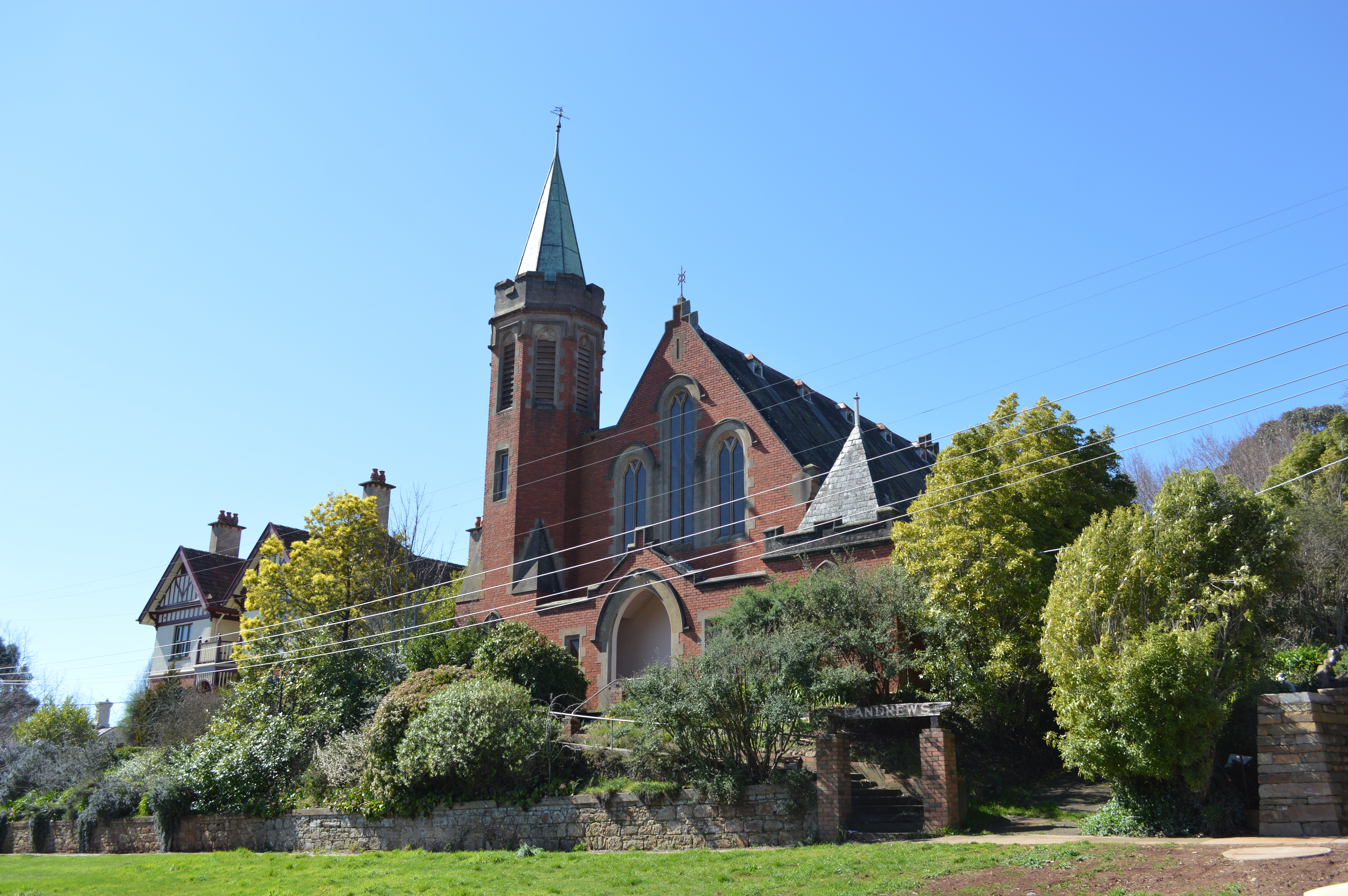
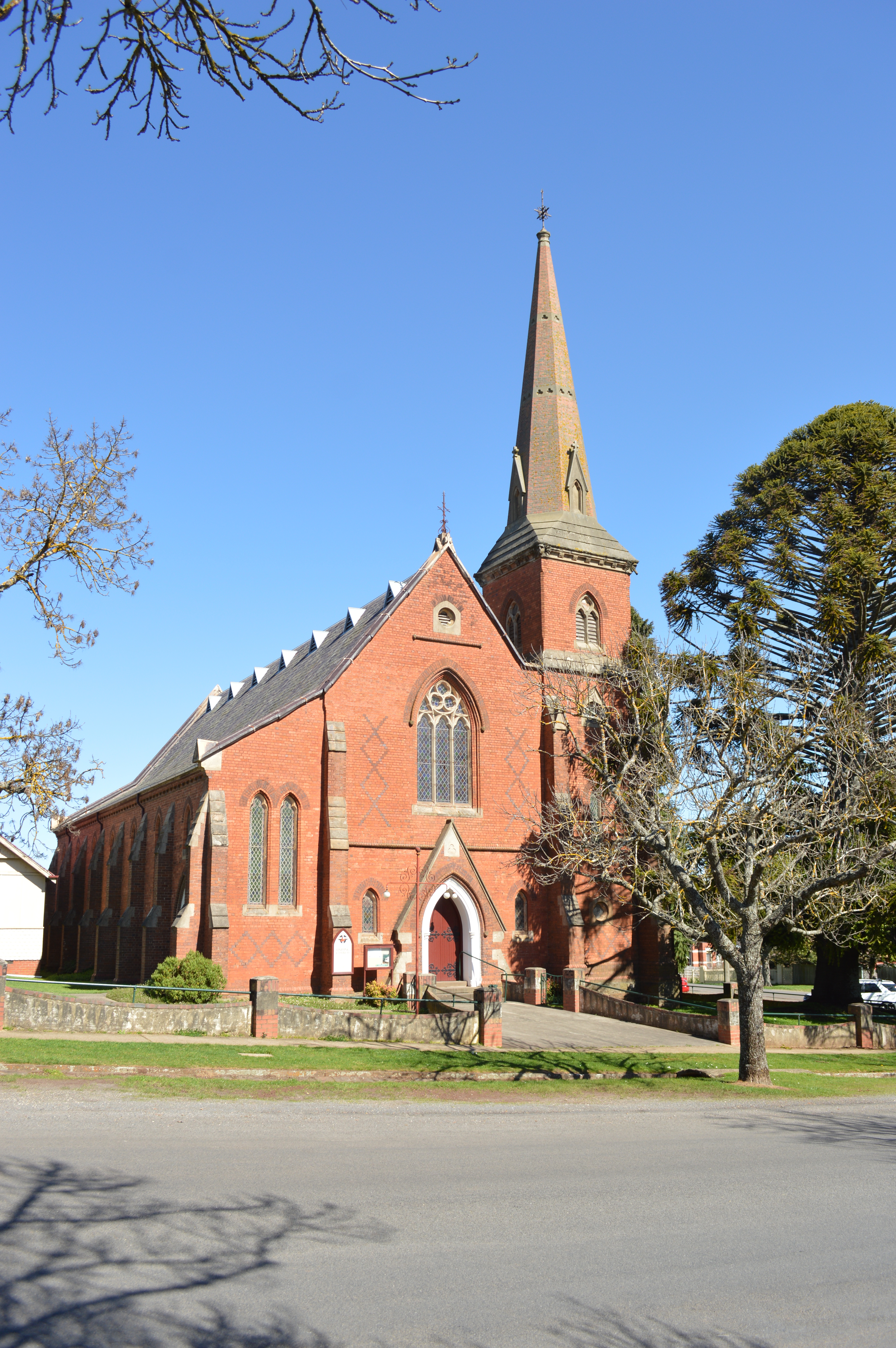
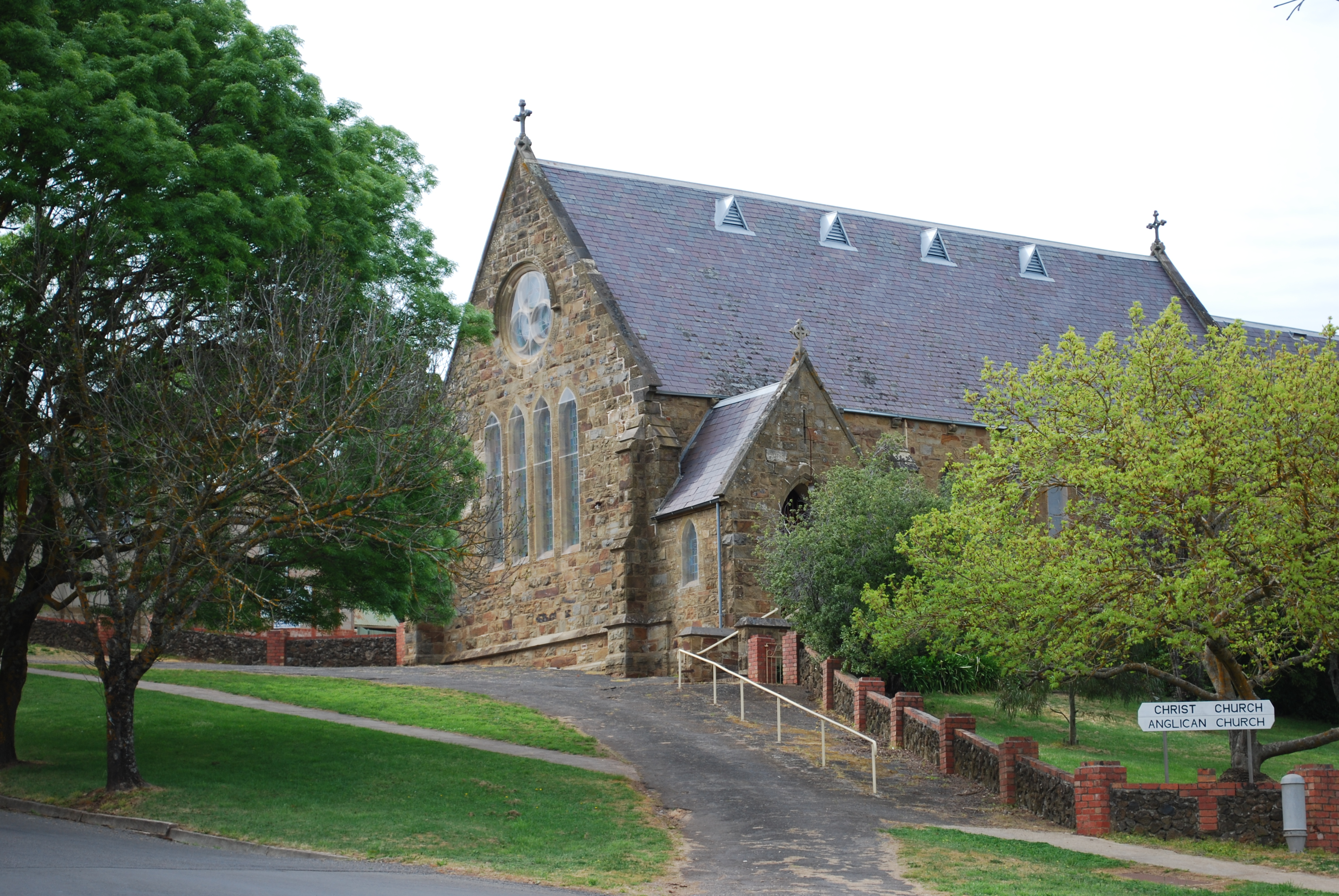
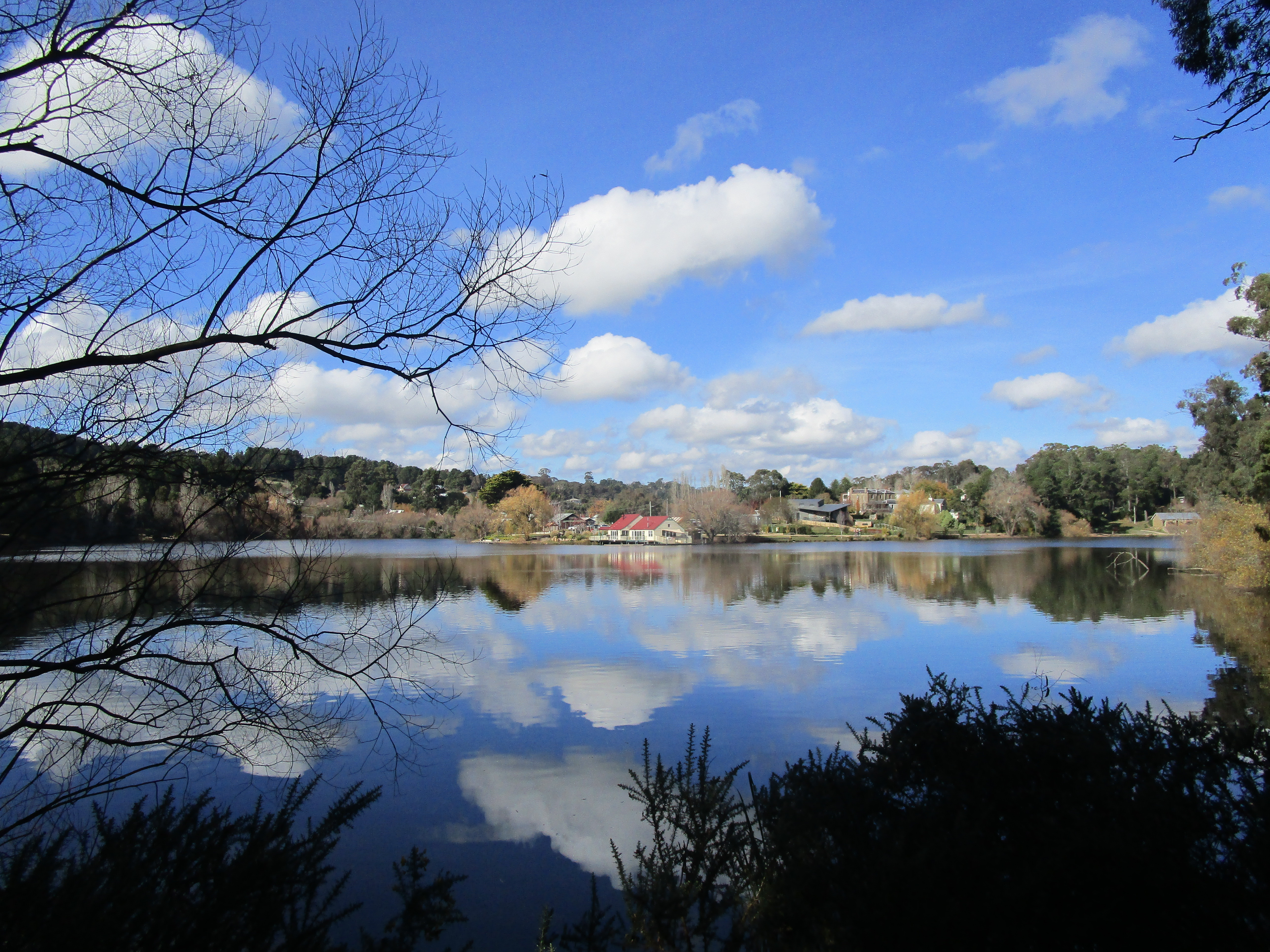
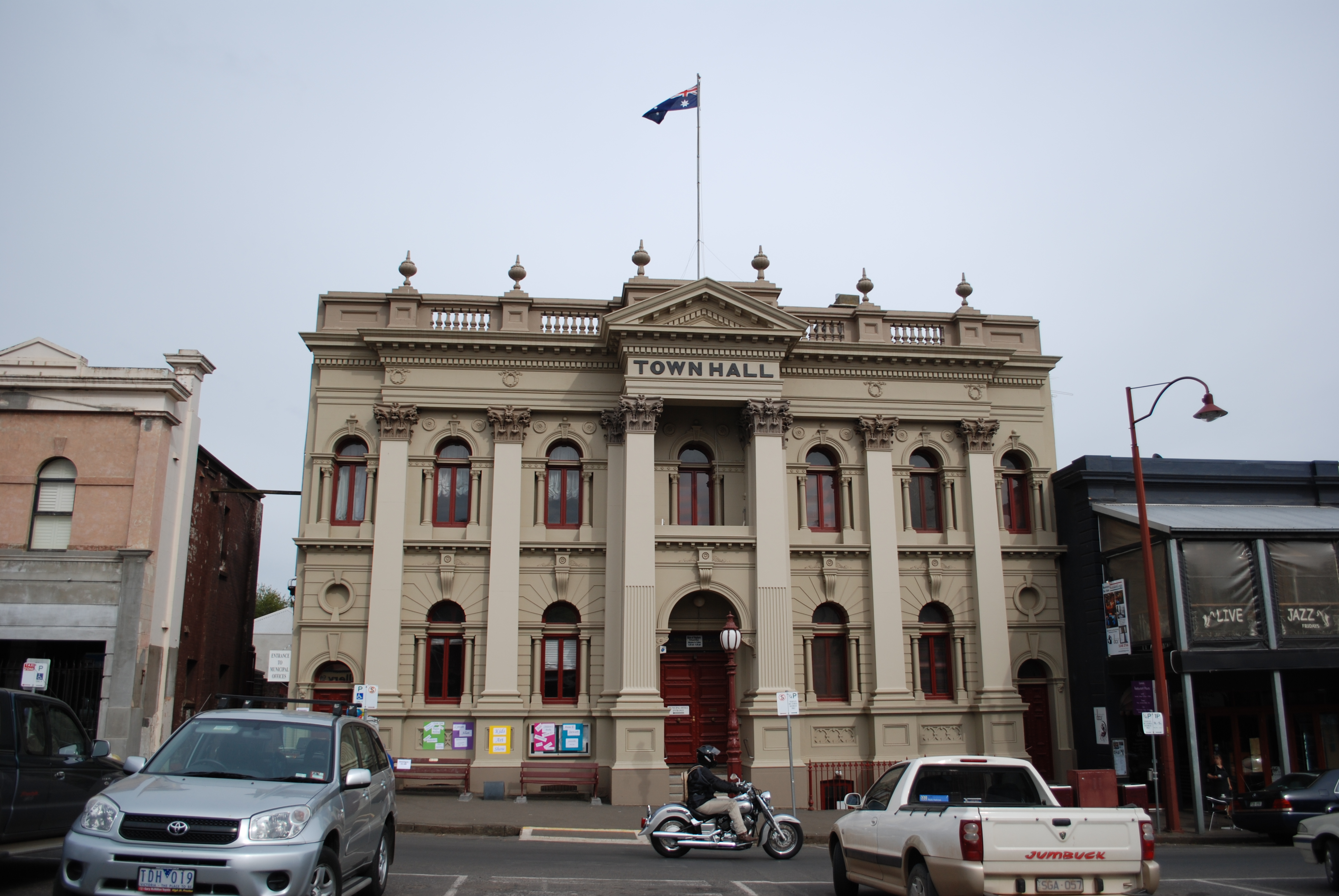
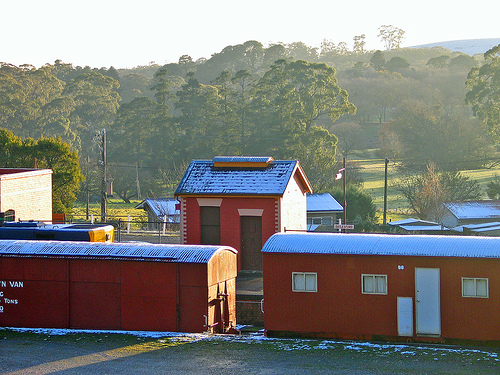
- Daylesford as seen from Wombat Hill Former Presbyterian Church Former Uniting Church Christ Church Lake Daylesford Town Hall Railway station

- Interactive map of Daylesford
- Coordinates: 37°21′0″S 144°09′0″E
- Country: Australia
- State: Victoria
- LGA: Shire of Hepburn
- Location: 114 km (71 mi) NW of Melbourne; 43 km (27 mi) NE of Ballarat; 37 km (23 mi) S of Castlemaine; 3 km (1.9 mi) S of Hepburn Springs
- Established: 1852

Government
  - State electorate: Macedon
  - Federal division: Ballarat

Area
  - Total: 36.2 km^{2} (14.0 sq mi)
- Elevation: 616 m (2,021 ft)

Population
  - Total: 2,781 (2021 census)
  - Density: 76.82/km^{2} (198.97/sq mi)
- Time zone: UTC+10 (AEST)
  - Summer (DST): UTC+11 (AEDT)
- Postcode: 3460
- County: Talbot
- Mean max temp: 15.5 °C (59.9 °F)
- Mean min temp: 7.0 °C (44.6 °F)
- Annual rainfall: 882.4 mm (34.74 in)
Localities around Daylesford
| Hepburn | Hepburn Springs | Coomoora |
| Eganstown | Daylesford | Musk |
| Musk Vale | Musk Vale | Musk |

Daylesford is a town in the foothills of the Great Dividing Range, within the Shire of Hepburn, Victoria, Australia, approximately 114 kilometres north-west of Melbourne. First established in 1852 as a gold mining town, Daylesford had a population of 2,781 at the 2021 census.

As one of Australia's few spa towns, Daylesford is a notable tourist destination. The town's numerous spas, restaurants and galleries are popular alongside the many gardens and country-house-conversion styled bed and breakfasts.

The broader area around the town, including Hepburn Springs to the north, is known for its natural spring mineral spas and is the location of over 80 per cent of Australia's effervescent mineral water reserve.

It is also the filming location for the third season of The Saddle Club, the twenty first season of The Block and scenes from the 2004 film Love's Brother.

== History ==
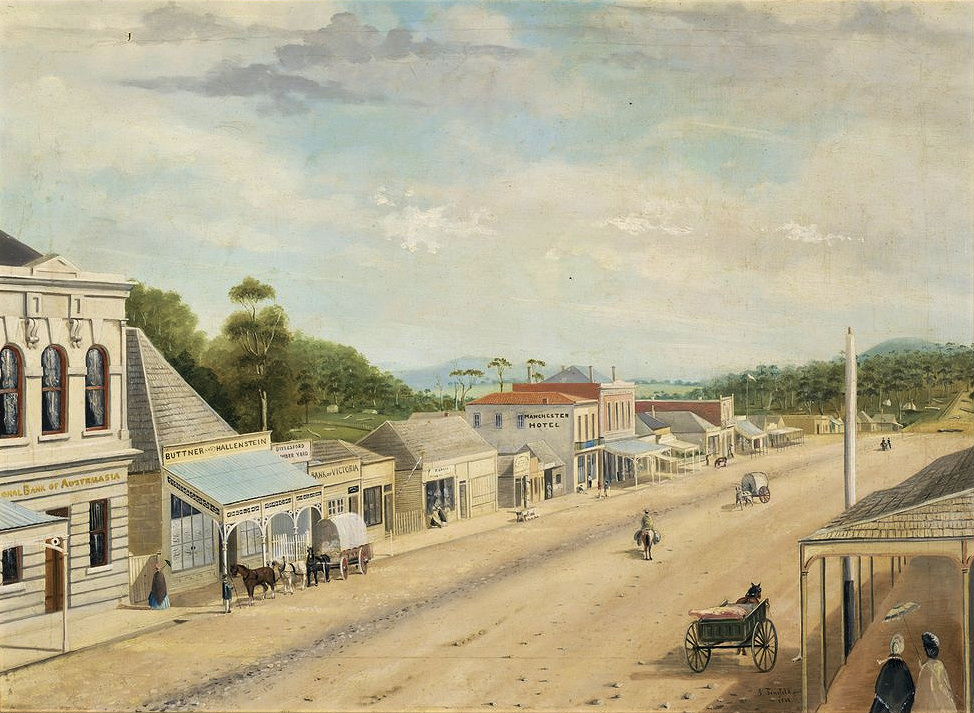
J. Tenseld, Main Street, Daylesford, 1862, State Library of Victoria

Prior to European settlement, the area was occupied by the Dja Dja Wurrung people. Pastoralists occupied the Jim Crow and Upper Loddon districts following early white settlement in 1838, and Edward Stone Parker established a farming protectorate for the Dja Dja Wurrung at Franklinford in 1841. The beginning of the Victorian Gold Rush a decade later imposed further suffering on the Dja Dja Wurrung in the area, and by 1863, most of the protectorate's survivors had been moved to the Coranderrk reserve at Healesville.

In 1851, Irish immigrant John Egan and a party of searchers found alluvial gold in the bed of Wombat Creek, now covered by Lake Daylesford, initiating the local gold rush. Other finds quickly followed and a townsite was surveyed and founded in 1854, initially named Wombat but soon renamed Daylesford after the birthplace of Warren Hastings, the first governor-general of India.

Agricultural activity followed the gold rush, with many of the Chinese in the area also operating market gardens, and Italians in particular establishing vineyards. A post office opened on 1 February 1858, and a telegraph office opened in August 1859, the same year Daylesford became a municipality. By that time, its population had risen to approximately 7,000, with around 3,400 diggers involved in mining efforts, and the town's first council was formed.

Daylesford was declared a borough in the early 1860s. The alluvial gold was exhausted by then and a shift to quartz reef mining began. This continued on and off into the 1930s, though by the 1920s many miners had already departed for Western Australia.

The arrival of the railway in 1881 helped to boost Daylesford's reputation as a fashionable spa resort. The town fell out of favour as a tourist destination in the Great Depression, with visitors' interest returning in the early 1980s.

On 30 June 1867, three boys from Connells Gully, near Table Hill (William Graham, 7, his brother Thomas, 4, and Alfred Burman, 5), wandered into the bush near Daylesford. Despite exhaustive searches for nearly a month after the boys' disappearance, their remains were not found until 13 September, when a farmer's dog found a boot about 10 kilometres away. Today, there is a park, a memorial cairn, and a 16-kilometre long "Lost Children's Walk" that visitors can hike. The Daylesford Primary School also has a prize, the Graham Dux Award, presented annually since 1889 in their memory.

The Daylesford Magistrates' Court closed on 1 January 1990.

== Climate ==
At 616 metres (2,021 ft) above sea level, Daylesford has a cooler, wetter climate than Melbourne. Summer (January–February) temperatures range from 10 to 37 °C (50 to 99 °F), while July temperatures are cold, ranging from about 1–2 °C (34–36 °F) to 9 °C (48 °F). Annual precipitation, occasionally falling as snow, averages about 880 mm (35 in) but has ranged from 445 mm (17.5 in) to over 1,350 mm (53 in) per year.

== Economy ==
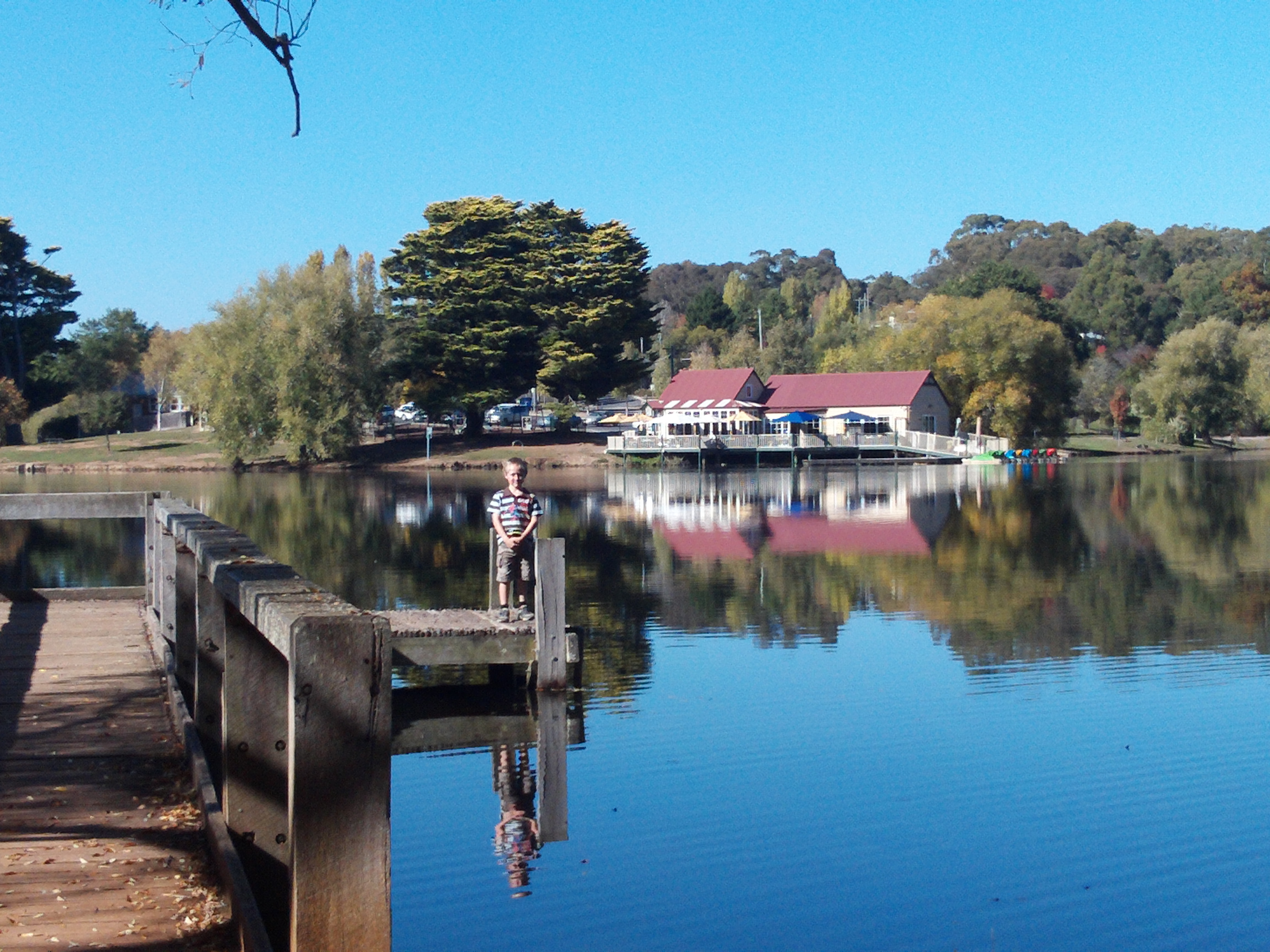
Lake Daylesford

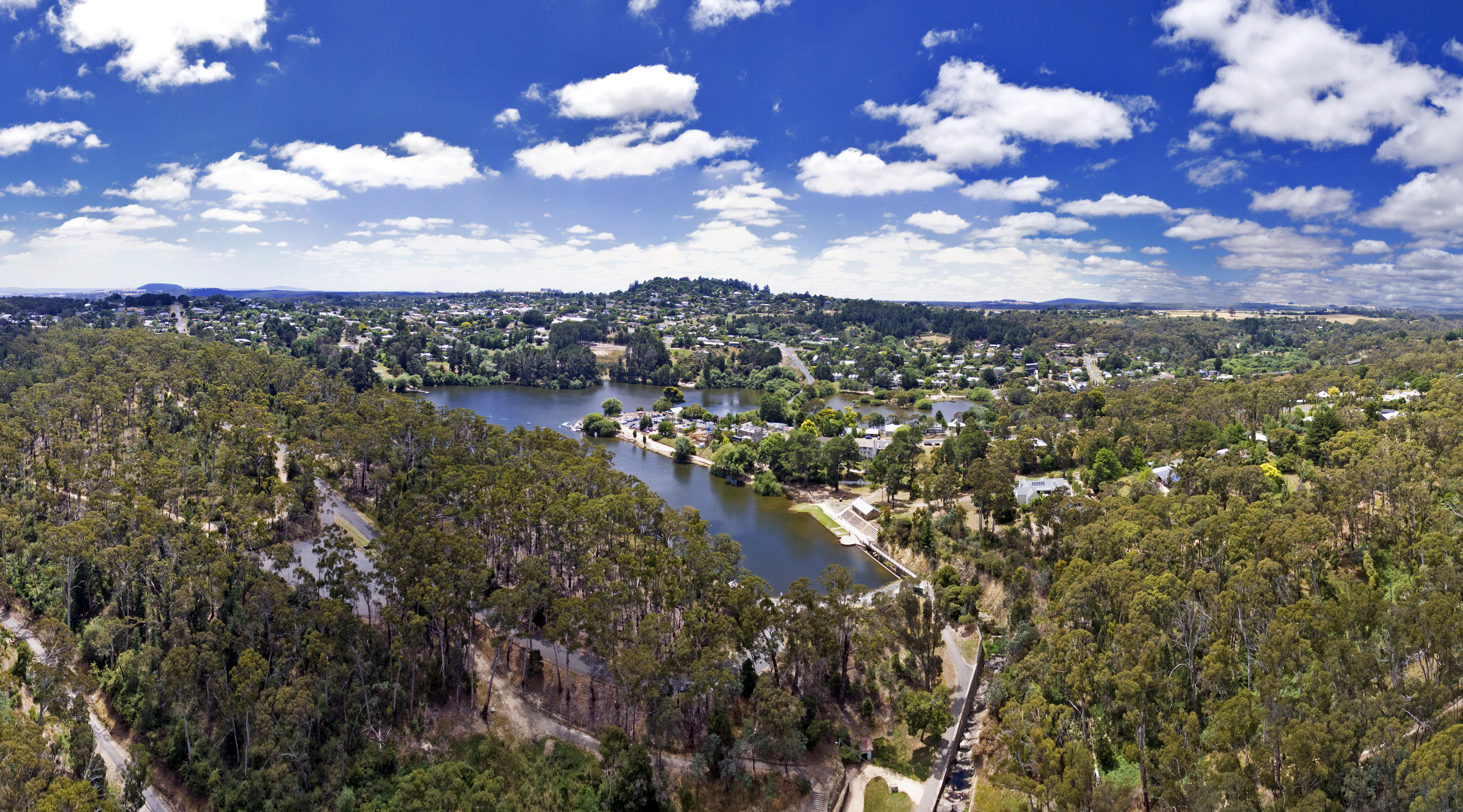
Aerial panorama of Lake Daylesford in summer, 2018.

With 65 mineral springs, the Daylesford-Hepburn Springs region accounts for more than 80 per cent of Australia's known mineral water springs. As a result, the region has a number of spa developments including Hepburn Bathhouse & Spa, Mineral Spa at Peppers Springs Retreat, and the Salus Spa at Lake House. The town is also known for hosting a number of annual events, including the ChillOut Festival held during the Victorian Labour Day long weekend in March each year, the largest LGBTQ festival in rural and regional Australia; the Harvest Week Festival; the Lavandula's Festivals; and the Hepburn Springs Swiss Italian Festival celebrating the town's Swiss-Italian heritage. The annual Daylesford Highland Gathering features pipes and drums, Highland heavy games, a street march, dancing and cultural food and drink, and highlights a variety of Scottish clans and local clubs.

Major industries in the economy of Daylesford today are healthcare, accommodation and food, and retail trade respectively.

== Education ==
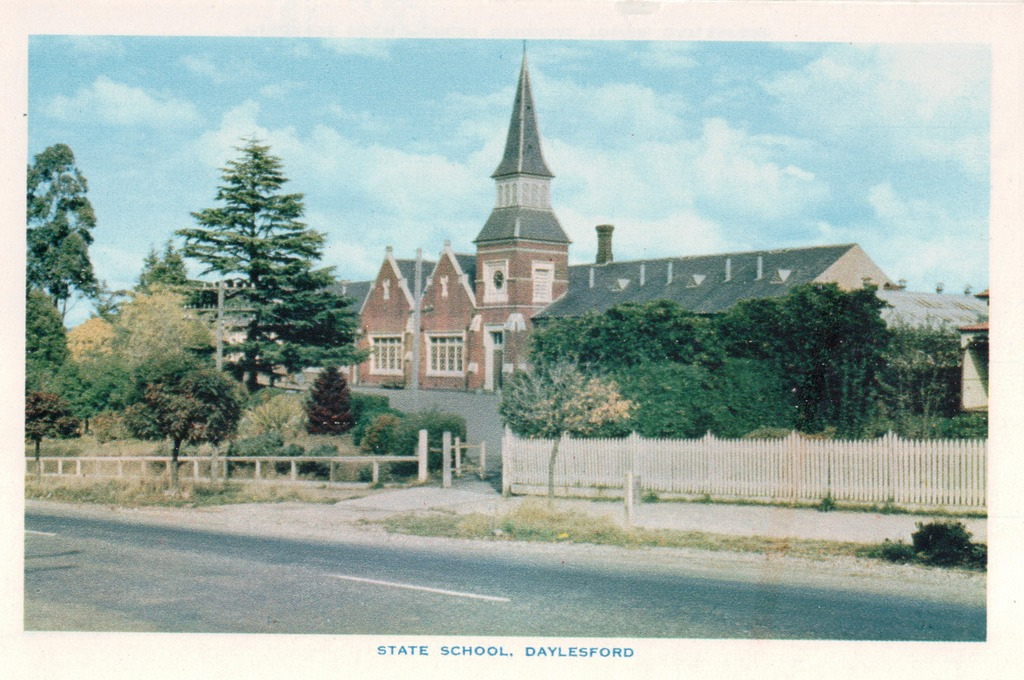
Daylesford State School (b. 1875) post card

The town is served by a number of primary schools and one public secondary school, Daylesford Secondary College. The town's Secondary College was originally established as a mining school, in 1890. In 1961 the college was established as the sole provider of secondary education in the Shire of Hepburn and has just over 500 pupils. Daylesford Primary School, formerly known as Daylesford State School, is the oldest and longest-running provider of primary education in Daylesford. Other primary schools in the area include St. Michael's Primary School and Daylesford Dharma School. Since 2010, Daylesford Primary School is host to an annual book fair where used and unwanted books are donated to raise funds that go towards improving children's literacy.

== Transport ==
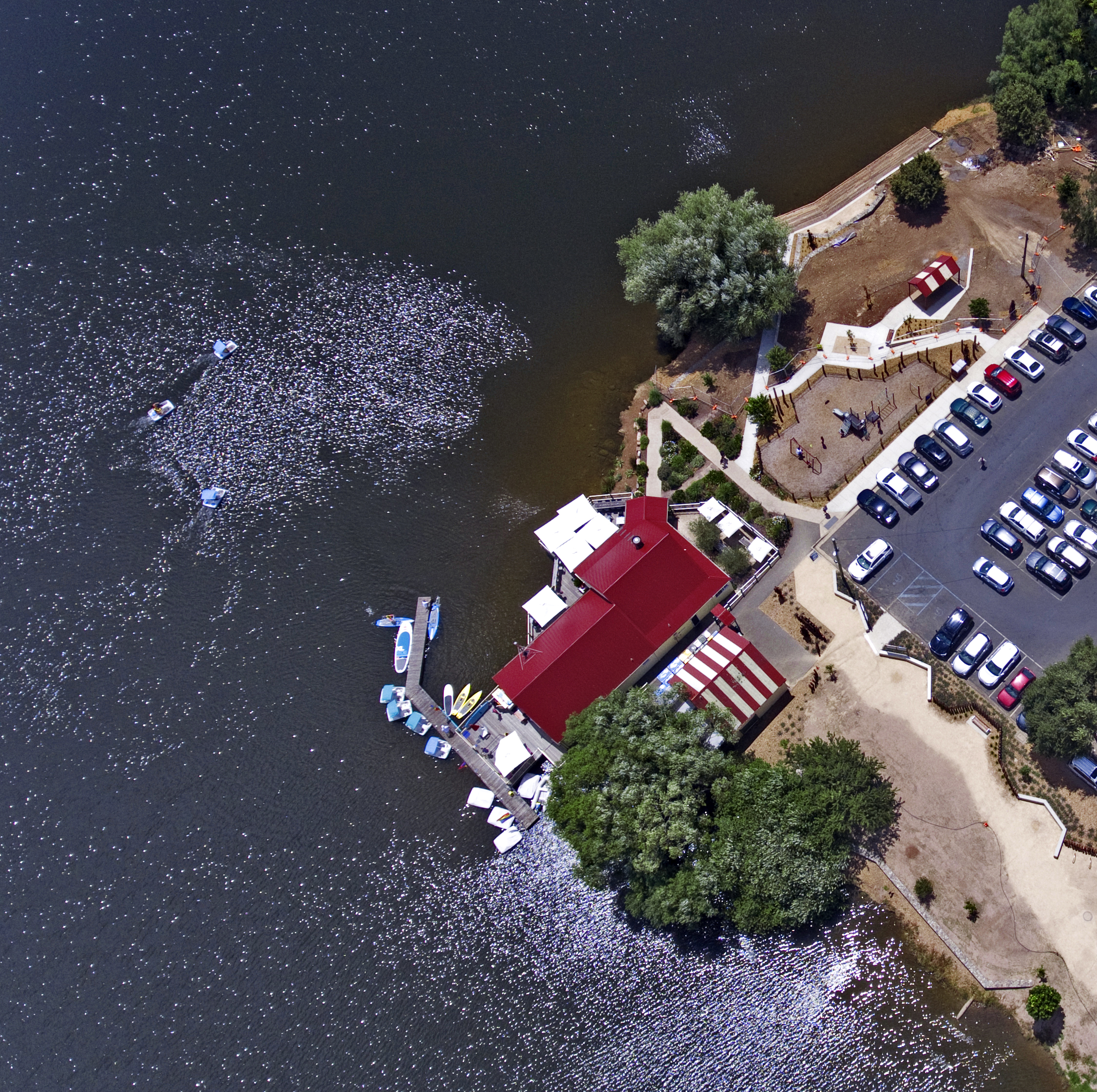
Aerial perspective of Daylesford Boathouse

The Midland Highway runs directly through the town linking it with Castlemaine in the north and Ballarat in the south-west. The Western Freeway is the main route linking Daylesford to Melbourne, the state capital of Victoria.

The railway to the town closed in 1978. The railway layout at Daylesford station was unusual in that the lines from Creswick and Carlsruhe both entered the station from the same end. The Daylesford Spa Country Railway currently operates a Sunday tourist service to Musk and Bullarto along the line towards Carlsruhe.

== Sport ==
The town has an Australian Rules football team and a netball team competing in the Central Highlands Football Netball League. Daylesford is also home to the Daylesford and Hepburn United Soccer Club, also known as the Saints or the Sainters. The Saints have won four league titles in their 20-year history along with two cup finals.

== Incidents ==
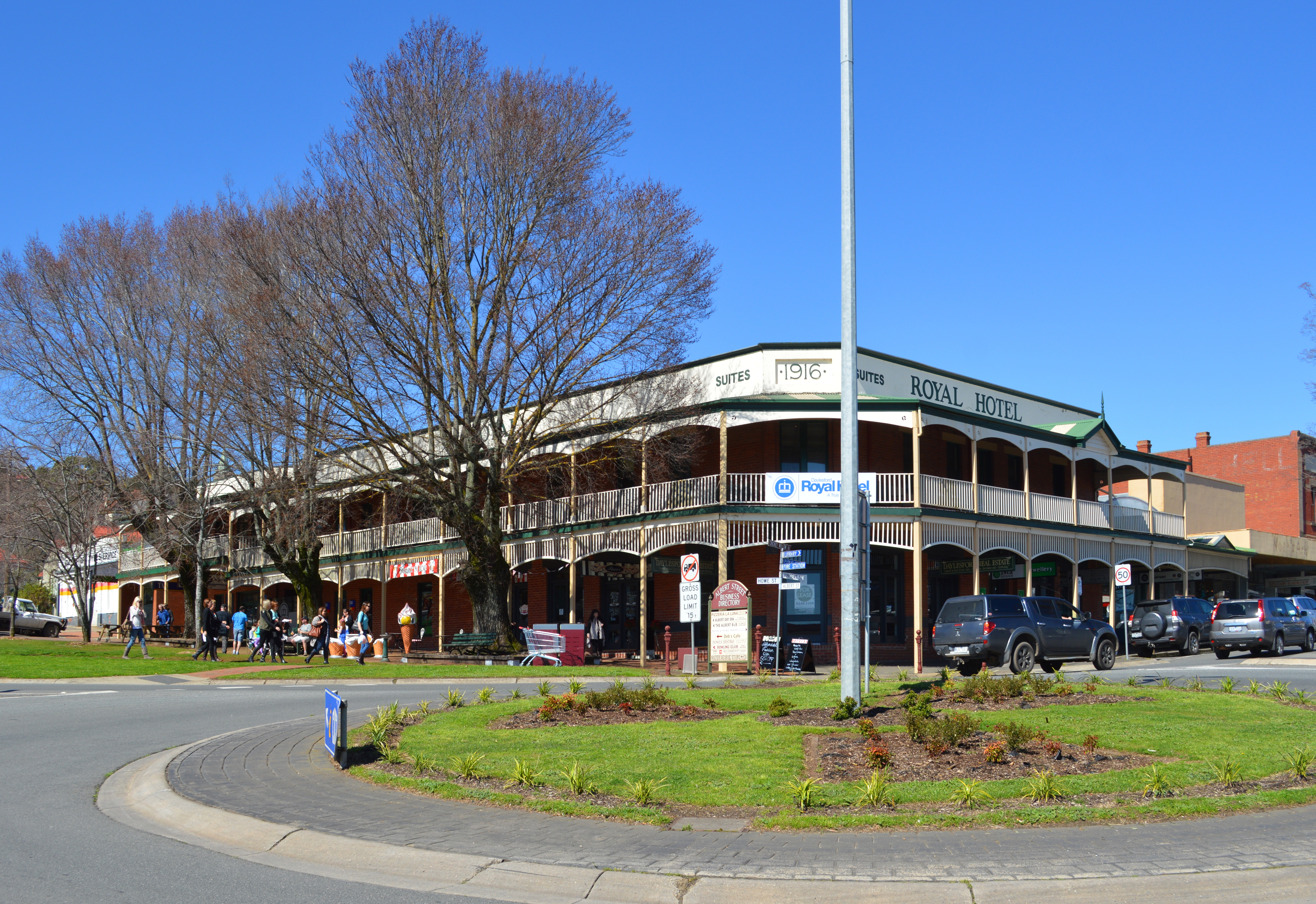
The Royal Hotel at Daylesford

On 5 November 2023, a car crashed into a beer garden situated in a grassed area in front of the Royal Daylesford Hotel resulting in the deaths of five people including two children, one aged nine and the other eleven.

== Notable people ==
- Prue Acton – fashion designer and artist
- David Allison – politician
- Keith Bradbury – politician
- David Bromley (born 1960) – artist, worked in Daylesford
- (Lord) Sebastian Ulick Browne – 12th marquess of Sligo
- Peter Corrigan – architect
- Josh Cowan – AFL footballer
- Bessie Lee Cowie – temperance campaigner
- Charlie Foletta – VFL footballer
- Joseph Furphy – novelist
- Jack Gervasoni – VFL footballer
- Chris Grant – AFL footballer
- Geraldine Hakewill – actress
- Lynda Heaven – politician
- John Stuart Hepburn – early pastoralist and landholder
- Merv Hobbs – AFL footballer
- Simon Holmes à Court – entrepreneur and founder of Climate 200
- Sir Charles Hotham – governor of Victoria
- George Raymond Johnson – architect (designed the Daylesford Town Hall)
- Samuel Johnson – actor and radio presenter
- Michael Leunig – cartoonist
- Peter Loney – politician
- Cecily Maude O'Connell – trade unionist and religious social worker
- Charlie Pannam
- Ambrose McCarthy Patterson – painter and printmaker
- Alfred Cecil Rowlandson – publisher
- Edward Russell – trade unionist
- Jack Stevens – major general (Australian Army)
- Eugene von Guerard – painter
- Ferdinand von Mueller – botanist
- Abigail Wehrung – basketball player
- Carl Willis
- Mark Leonard Winter – actor

== Gallery ==
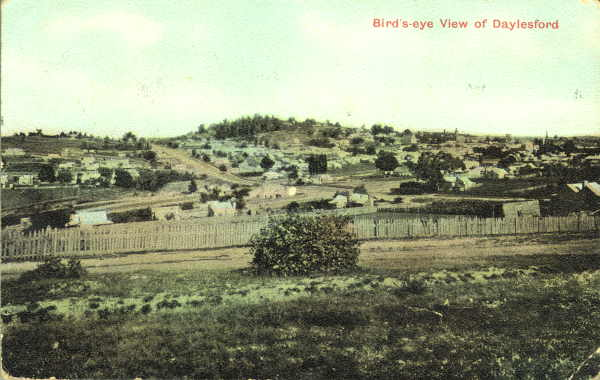
Daylesford circa 1908

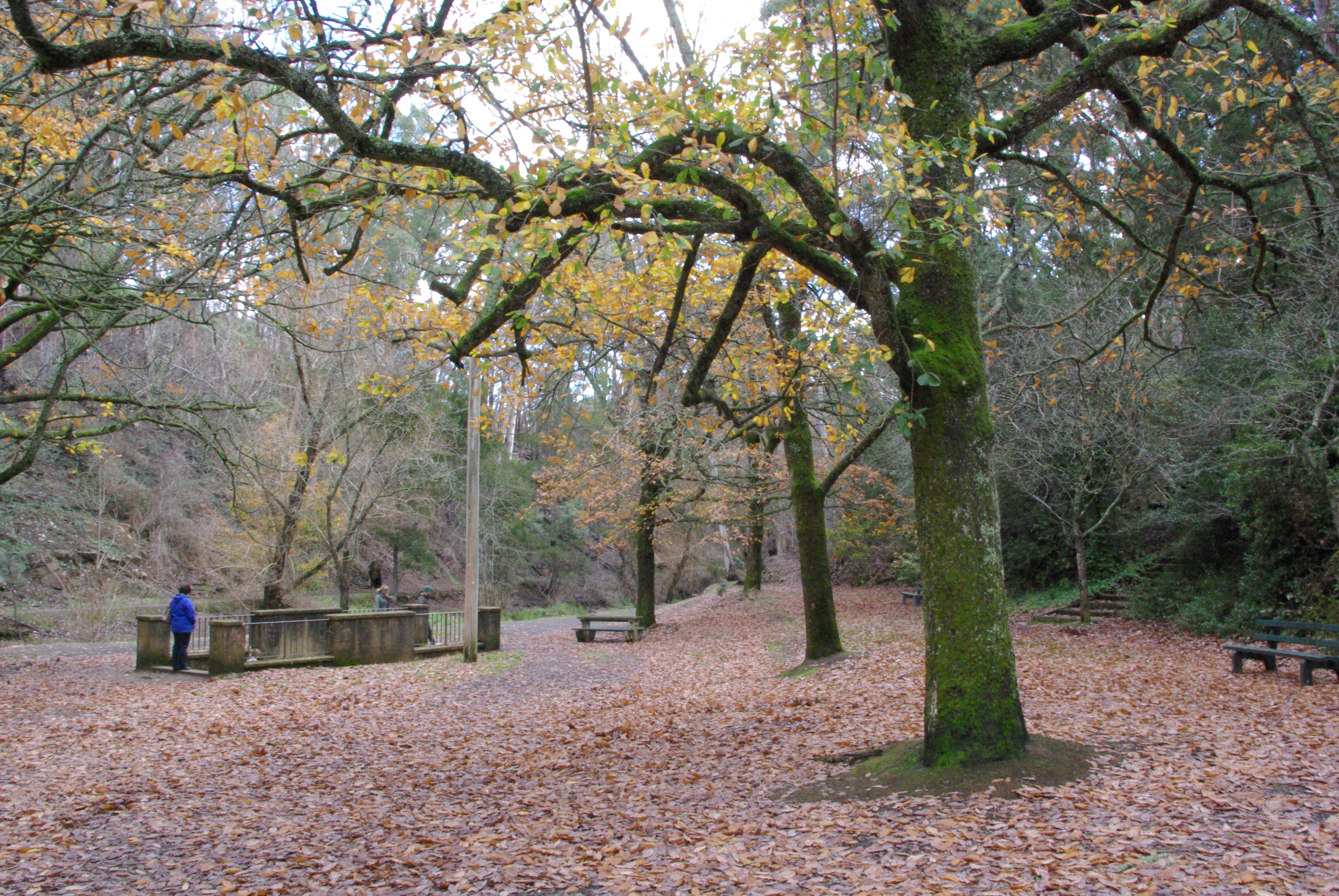
Park in winter

== See also ==
- Daylesford railway station
- Daylesford Spa Country Railway
- Lake Daylesford
- List of places of worship in Hepburn Shire
- Balt Camp

== Sources ==
- Daylesford Advocate, Mercury, Express, Mercury-Express. 1859-1870
