= ChillOut Festival =

LGBTQI festival in Victoria, Australia

- Genre: LGBT pride parade and festival
- Begins: Labour Day weekend
- Ends: Second Monday in March
- Frequency: Annually
- Locations: Daylesford, Victoria, Australia
- Inaugurated: 1997
- Website: chilloutfestival.com.au

The ChillOut Festival is held in Daylesford, Victoria, every year on the Victorian Labour Day long weekend in March. ChillOut is the largest LGBTQI festival in regional Australia.

== History ==
The ChillOut Festival started in 1997.

In 2020, the ChillOut Festival tried to break the Guinness World Record for the largest human rainbow. The festival distributed coloured T-shirts with tickets to allow festivalgoers to participate.

ACON, Sexual Health Victoria, and the Australian Department of Health and Aged Care partnered to do swab cervical cancer screenings in 2025. These screening were part of a national "Own It" campaign.

In 2026, it was held from March 5–9 and attracted over 30,000 attendees from Australia and beyond. The event welcomed people of all ages and identities and featured Carnival Day, drag shows, dance parties, and community forums.
