= Lake Daylesford =

Man-made lake in Daylesford, Victoria, Australia

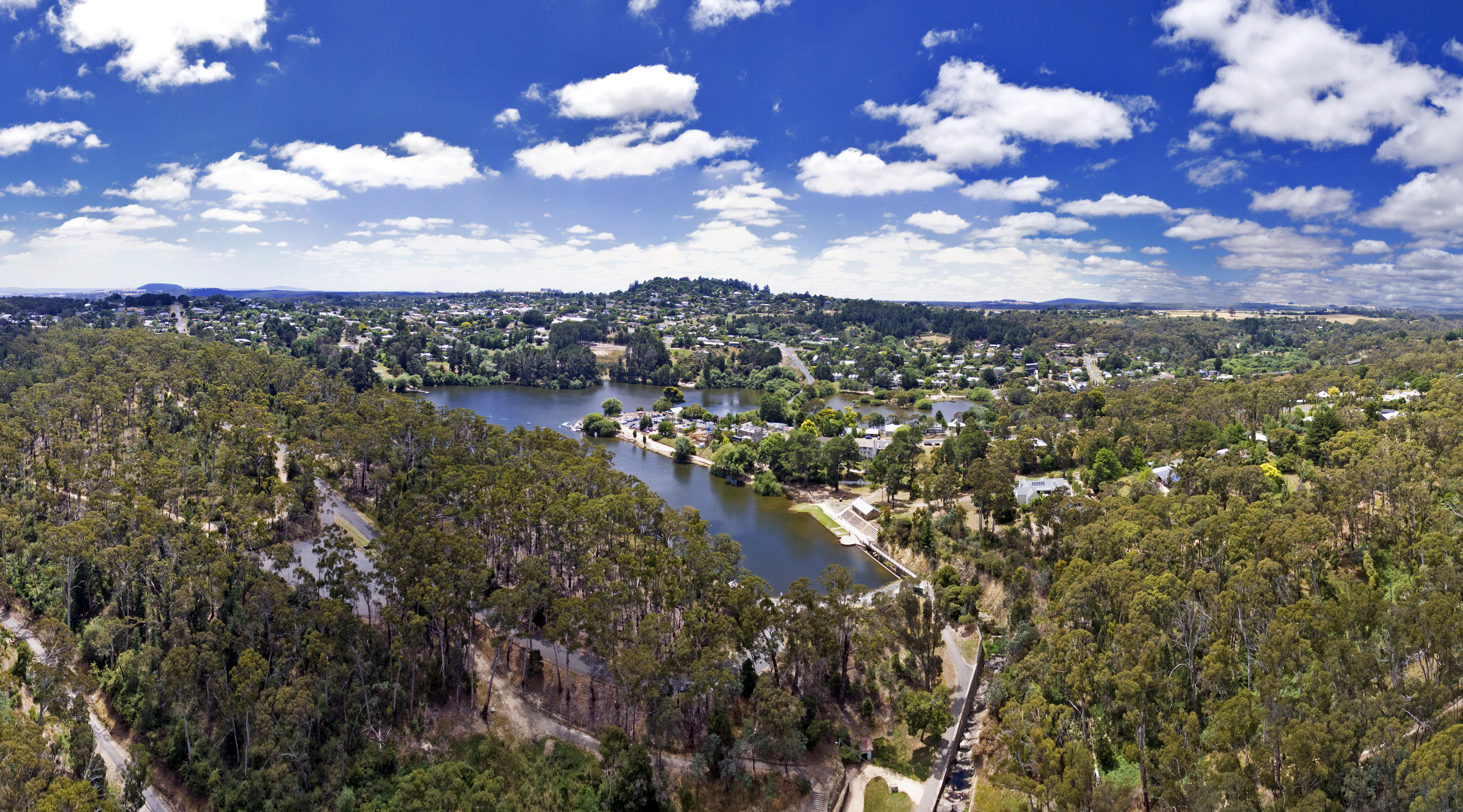
- Aerial panorama of Lake Daylesford

- Location within Victoria Location within Australia
- Location: Daylesford, Victoria
- Coordinates: 37°20′50″S 144°08′16″E
- Lake type: Artificial lake
- Primary inflows: Wombat Creek
- Primary outflows: Molonglo River
- Average depth: 2 m (6.6 ft)
- Max. depth: 9 m (30 ft)
- Surface elevation: 531 m (1,742 ft)
- Dam: Daylesford Dam

Lake Daylesford is an artificial lake in the town of Daylesford, Victoria, Australia. It was completed in either 1927 or 1929 after many years of campaigning, beginning in 1893. It was designed by Walter Burley Griffin, the American architect who won the competition to design the city of Canberra. Lake Daylesford was formed when the dam wall was built across Wombat Creek above the Central Springs in 1929. The town wanted an ornamental body of water to beautify the scarred creek landscape.

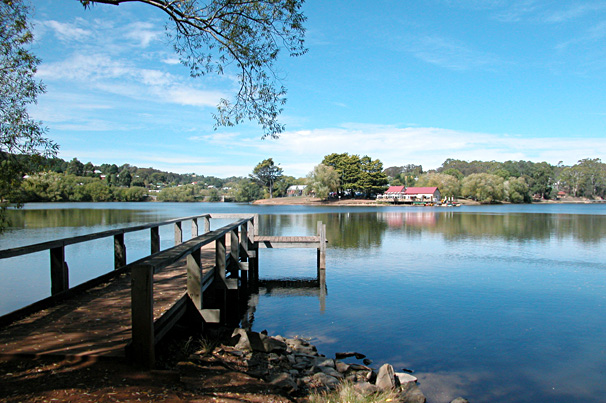

== Site location and planting ==
Areas submerged by the lake included market gardens, several mineral springs, and the site of the former Chinese settlement, including a Joss house. Walter Burley Griffin recommended native vegetation along the western side and the Progress Association and local schools helped plant European (Swedish) and native trees in other parts of the reserve.

== Opening of the lake ==
On Thursday 17 April 1930, the streets of Daylesford were decorated with flags and decorations when the Governor, Lord Somers accompanied by Flight Lieut. Denny, arrived by car at 12.30 p.m. The Borough Band played selections outside the Town Hall, and the Boy Scouts under Scoutmaster Thorsen, were present. After inspecting the Scouts, Governor Somers was welcomed in the Town Hall by Borough Councillors.

A lunch was held in the Rex Theatre and the tables were decorated with blue delphiniums, marigolds and autumn leaves. Palms and clusters of Aster viminalis (Easter daisies) decorated the area, and the Governor's table was decorated with autumn-tinted Virginia creeper leaves.

After the lunch, the party left for the Wombat Hill Botanic Gardens, where the Governor expressed admiration for their "rare beauty". He was disappointed that he had not more time at his disposal to explore them more fully.

On a raised platform at the lake bank, the Governor declared the lake open. A large crowd was around the banks and he was introduced by the Mayor (Cr Crockett). His Excellency said he "would like to think that the building of the lake had been delayed for 25 years so that he might be given the opportunity of opening it."

== Opening of the bridge ==
At the new bridge the Governor praised the work which the Country Roads Board had done to develop the State. He had many opportunities of seeing the roads constructed by the Board, and it was pleasing to know of the co-operation between the Board and the Borough Council. This co-operation would be a great aid in the development of the springs, and of great benefit to the State.

== Friends of Lake Daylesford and developments ==
In the 1980s and the formation of the Friends of Lake Daylesford (FOLD) whose membership comprised local residents, particularly with properties adjacent to the lake reserve. The group were very active and maintained a close and cooperative relationship with the then Shire of Daylesford and Glenlyon. In 1990, working bees were conducted on the second Saturday of each month.

In the 1980s and 1990s the level of the lake was lowered for a period of time to allow for works on the retaining wall. This gave the opportunity to remove rubbish which had accumulated in the lake since its creation. Member David Endacott was responsible for propagation of a range of native trees which members in turn planted in large numbers around the southern section of the lake. The extensive range of trees seen today resulted from this work.
