= Daylesford =

The name Daylesford is borne by a number of settlements:

- Daylesford, Victoria, Australia
- Daylesford, Saskatchewan, in Rural Municipality of Lake Lenore No. 399, Canada
- Daylesford, Gloucestershire, England
- Daylesford, Pennsylvania, United States
  - Daylesford (SEPTA station), a commuter rail station

== See also ==
- Daylesford Abbey
- Daylesford Football Club
- Daylesford Monastery
- Daylesford Secondary College
- Daylesford Spa Country Railway
  - Daylesford railway station
- Electoral district of Daylesford
