= Musk railway station =

Railway station in Victoria, Australia

Coordinates: 37°22′22″S 144°11′34″E

Musk

General information
- Location: 116.2 km (72.2 mi) from Flinders Street
- System: Daylesford Spa Country Railway station
- Operator: Daylesford Spa Country Railway
- Line: Daylesford
- Platforms: 1
- Tracks: 1

Other information
- Status: Tourist station

History
- Opened: 17 March 1880 re-opened 1990
- Closed: 3 July 1978
Location

Musk railway station is in Musk, in central Victoria, Australia. It was opened in September 1881 under the name of Musk Creek, the name being shortened to Musk in 1905. The station closed with the line on Monday, 3 July 1978.

In 1969, the platform was 46.5 m (50.9 yd) in length, and a weighbridge was in place. By 1975, the station was being worked under no-one-in-charge conditions.

== Re-opening ==
During the mid to late 1980s, the Daylesford Spa Country Railway (DSCR) used ganger's trolleys to convey passengers on short trips from Daylesford station to the Wombat State Forest, about halfway between Daylesford and Musk. On 15 September 1990, the DSCR began railmotor services between Daylesford and Musk, the first for the first time in 13 years. The section of line between Musk and Bullarto was reopened on 17 March 1997.

Musk Station consists of little more than a small platform and a tin shed, but is stopped at by most tourist services operated by the DSCR.

Preceding station	Heritage railways	Following station
Passing Clouds	Daylesford Spa Country Railway	Daylesford
Entire line
