= Passing Clouds railway station =

Railway station in Victoria, Australia

Coordinates: 37°23′38″S 144°13′20″E

Passing Clouds
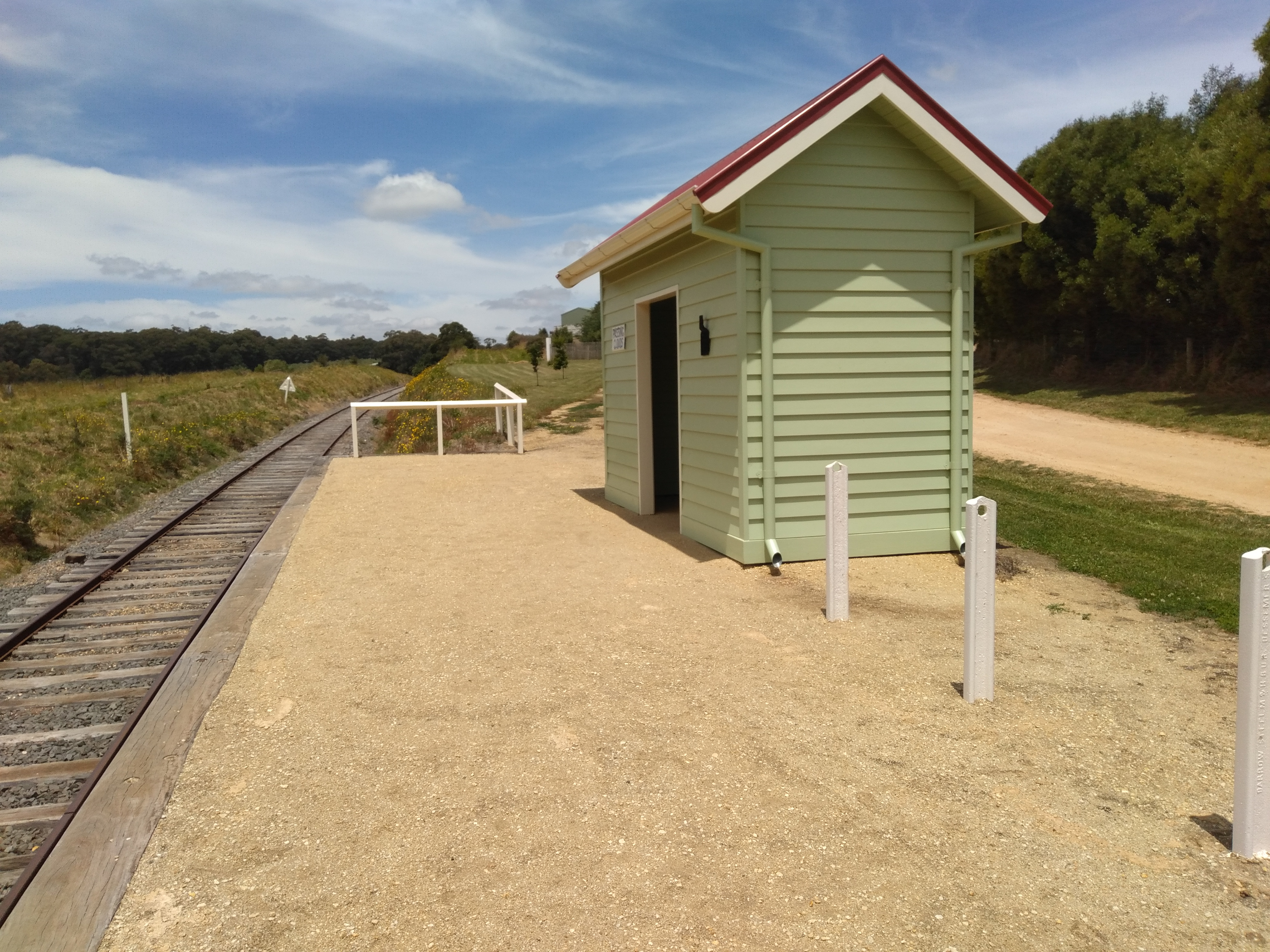
- Passing Clouds station, 2020

General information
- System: Daylesford Spa Country Railway station
- Line: Daylesford
- Platforms: 1
- Tracks: 1

Other information
- Status: Tourist station

History
- Opened: 19 July 2018
Location

Passing Clouds railway station is situated on the Daylesford railway line, in the locality of Musk, in Central Victoria, Australia. It was opened on 19 July 2018, to serve the adjacent Passing Clouds winery, which is within walking distance. The station is served by the tourist trains operated by the Daylesford Spa Country Railway.

The station consists of a short gravel platform with a weatherboard waiting shelter.

Preceding station	Heritage railways	Following station
Bullarto	Daylesford Spa Country Railway	Musk
Entire line
