= Domino Trail =

Coordinates: 37.3923°S 144.2857°E

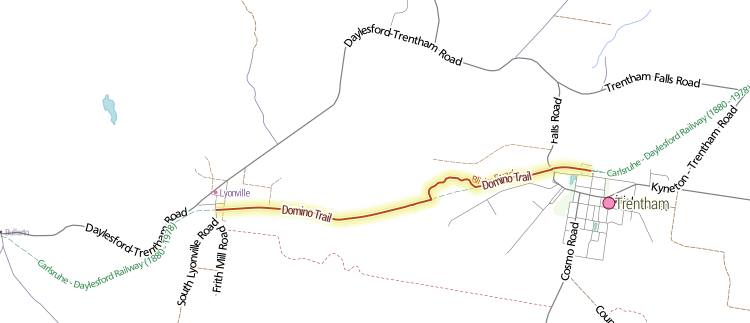
Map of the Domino Trail

The Domino Trail is a shared used path running from Trentham, Victoria to Lyonville, 75km northwest of Melbourne. The trail mostly follows part of the route of the former Carlsruhe to Daylesford railway line — part of which is still running as the Daylesford Spa Country Railway —. The trail has been primarily developed for walkers, but is usable by mountain bikes.
