= Tylden railway station =

Former railway station in Victoria, Australia

Coordinates: 37°20′13″S 144°26′16″E

Tylden

General information
- Line: Daylesford
- Platforms: 1
- Tracks: 1

Other information
- Status: closed, station building removed

History
- Opened: 17 March 1880
- Closed: 3 July 1978

Services
Preceding station	Disused railways	Following station
Carlsruhe	Daylesford line	Fern Hill
	List of closed railway stations in Victoria	
Location

Tylden railway station was a railway station on the Daylesford line in Victoria, Australia, which was located about 2.4 km to the east of Tylden township, near Central Road. The station was opened in March 1880, after the Daylesford branch had been completed from Carlsruhe as far as Trentham. The station was 56.5 miles (90.9 km) from Spencer Street station (now Southern Cross), via Carlsruhe.

In February 1928, the station became unstaffed and was supervised from Carlsruhe station. In 1969, the platform was 46m in length. Tylden station was closed 3 July 1978, along with the whole Daylesford line.

The Tylden station building was moved about 1 mile (1.6 km) west of its original location and placed on bluestone footings, behind a c. 1860-70's Victorian house, at the intersection of Chanters Lane and the Woodend- Trentham Road. In 2015/16, as part of a controversial expansion of a bluestone mine on the edge of the Tylden township, New Zealand-owned multinational corporation, Fulton Hogan, demolished the Victorian home, an adjoining historic shearing shed and the Tylden station building, with an excavator, feeding the remains of the wooden buildings through a tub grinder, turning them into mulch. That was despite several attempts by locals to relocate or save the station building.

The railway tracks have been dismantled, but the platform embankment remains.
