= Johnny Coghlan =

Australian rules footballer

Personal information
- Full name: John Coghlan
- Born: 24 April 1876; Bullarto, Victoria
- Died: 21 October 1916 (aged 40); Bullarto, Victoria
- Original team: Warragul

Playing career^{1}
| Years | Club | Games (Goals) |
| 1898 | Melbourne | 5 (0) |
- ^{1} Playing statistics correct to the end of 1898.

Johnny Coghlan (24 April 1876 – 21 October 1916) was an Australian rules footballer who played with Melbourne in the Victorian Football League (VFL).
