= Lyonville =

- Town
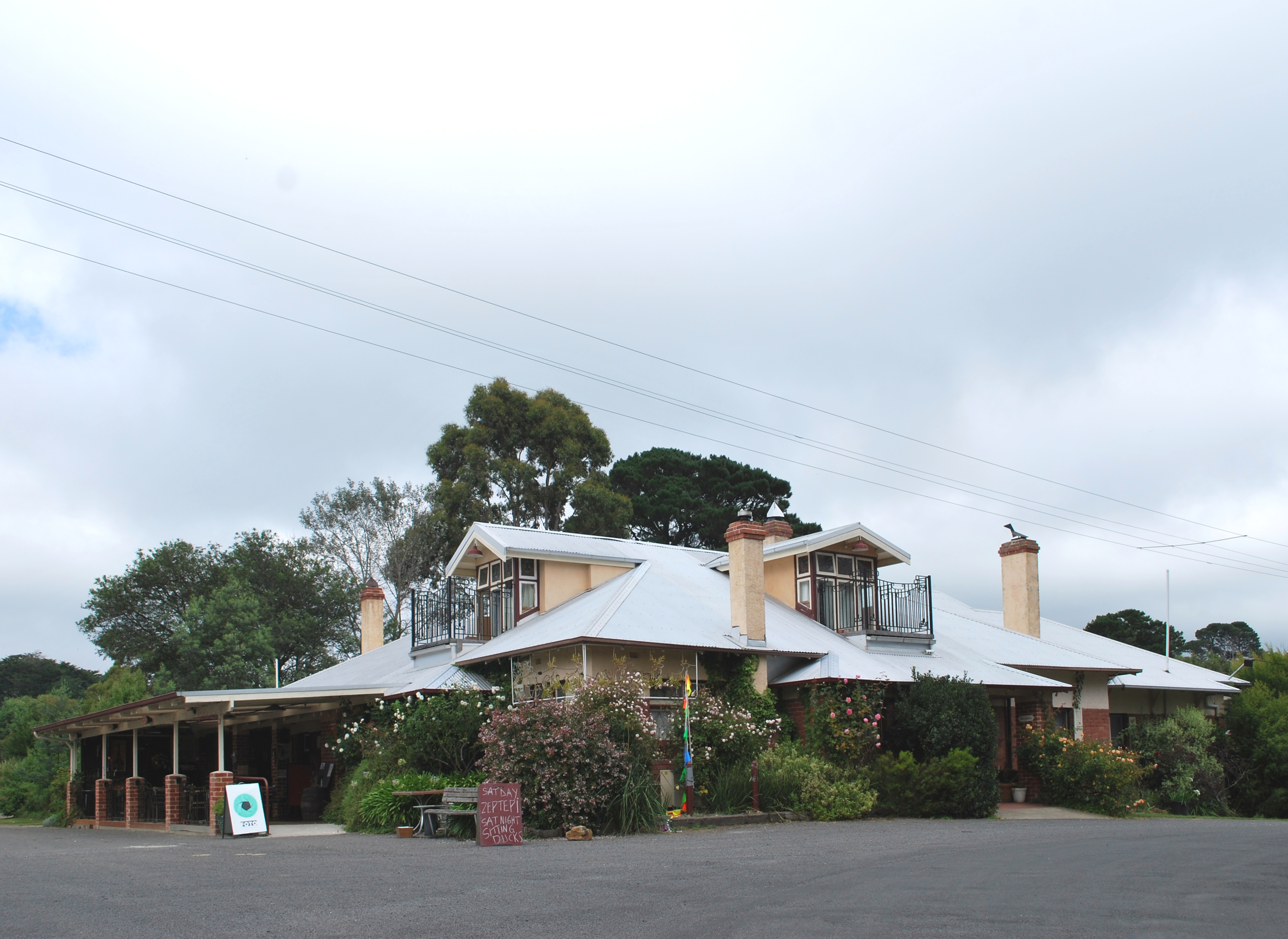
- Radio Springs Hotel

- Interactive map of Lyonville
- Coordinates: 37°24′0″S 144°16′0″E
- Country: Australia
- State: Victoria
- LGA: Shire of Hepburn

Population
  - Total: 175 (2016 census)
- Postcode: 3461

Lyonville is a town in the Shire of Hepburn, Victoria, Australia, east of Daylesford on the Trentham road. The town takes its name from James Lyon, who arrived in the Glenlyon district in the 1860s. At the 2016 census, Lyonville had a population of 175.

== History ==
By 1876, James Lyon had built a large saw-mill in the Bullarook Forest. He had built another one by 1881, at which most of the adult male residents in the local community were employed. At that time, there was a state school with 60 students.

Lyonville was in the electoral district of Creswick by 1877. Lyonville Post Office opened on 15 May 1882 and closed in 1993.

The Lyonville railway station was on the Carlsruhe to Daylesford line, which opened in 1880 and closed in 1978. The Daylesford Spa Country tourist railway plans to extend its track along the former rail reserve from Bullarto east to Lyonville, and then on to Trentham.

=== Modern Lyonville ===
The local attractions include the Lyonville Spring, Lyonville Hatha Yoga studio and The Radio Springs Hotel. The latter was once owned by the radio and television personality Ernie Sigley.
