= Fern Hill railway station =

Former railway station in Victoria, Australia

Coordinates: 37°19′51″S 144°23′24″E

Fern Hill

General information
- Line: Daylesford
- Platforms: 1
- Tracks: 1

Other information
- Status: Closed

History
- Opened: 16 February 1880
- Closed: 3 July 1978

Services
Preceding station	Disused railways	Following station
Tylden	Daylesford line	Trentham
	List of closed railway stations in Victoria	
Location

Fern Hill railway station on the Daylesford railway line in Victoria, Australia was opened on Monday, 16 February 1880, and closed on Monday, 3 July 1978.

Very little remains of the former Fern Hill Station. The former station building was burnt down and most of the area is overgrown. A row of cypress trees marks the road off James Lane leading to the station site, and the platform remains can still be seen.

By 1969, the platform was 72.5m in length, and by 1975, a crane still existed at the station.
