= Lyonville railway station =

Former railway station in Victoria, Australia

Lyonville

General information
- Coordinates: 37°23′29″S 144°15′27″E
- Line: Daylesford
- Platforms: 1
- Tracks: 1

Other information
- Status: Closed

History
- Opened: 17 March 1880
- Closed: 3 July 1978

Services
Preceding station	Disused railways	Following station
Trentham	Daylesford line	Bullarto
	List of closed railway stations in Victoria	
Location

Lyonville railway station was a railway station in Lyonville, Victoria, Australia. The station was opened on Wednesday, 17 March 1880, and closed on Monday, 3 July 1978.

There is no longer any track at the station, although the previously derelict station building and platform have been restored as a private residence. A restored passenger carriage and guard's van are also located at the station.

Though the track has been removed, the station area is still zoned as railway land, but under lease for private use.

By 1969, the platform was 61m in length, and by 1975, the station was working under caretaker conditions.
