= Victorian Railways MT type carriage =

Victorian railmotor trailers

MT type carriages
- Manufacturer: Victorian Railways
- Built at: Multiple, same as corresponding railmotors
- Constructed: from 1922
- Successor: MTH carriages (for DERM and DRC railmotors)
- Operator: various heritage operators
- Lines served: Most branch lines including Healesville and Stony Point lines

Specifications
- Track gauge: 5 ft 3 in (1,600 mm)

The MT type carriages were railmotor trailers, used on the Victorian Railways (VR) in Australia.

== Construction ==
After the VR built its AEC railmotors, it was realised that extra capacity was needed. To that end, MT class RailMotor Trailers were constructed, specifically for the AEC railcars. When later railmotors were introduced, the same rolling stock code was used, resulting in the MT class being one which included several different designs. It was not uncommon for a train to be composed of one railmotor and two, three, or, in rare cases, four, trailers.

== Types ==
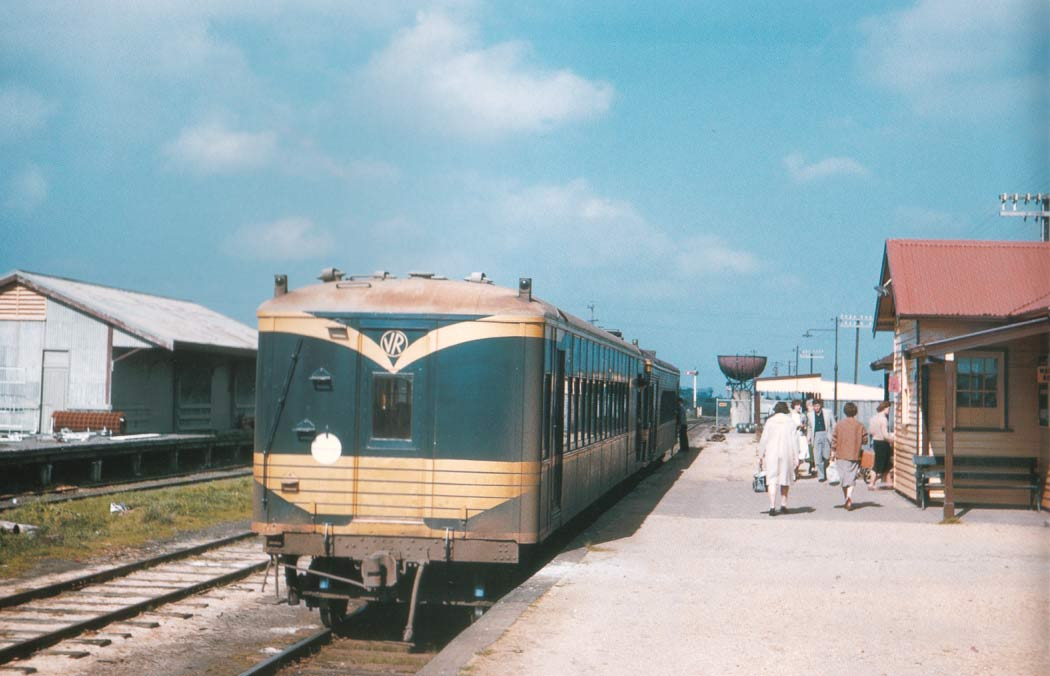
DERM trailer at Cranbourne station, 1961

=== AEC trailers ===
The first trailers were built between 1922 and 1925, to some slightly varying designs, and were numbered 1 to 24. They were painted red to match the four-wheeled AEC railmotors, and were the only four-wheel MT cars.

=== PERM trailers ===
25 MT was converted from locomotive-hauled wooden-bodied bogie passenger carriage 20 APL in 1928, for use with the first PERM.

Numbers 26 to 30 were built in April, September, and October 1930, when more PERMS entered service, and were initially painted red, although in a different shade to the AEC trailers. They were of steel-bodied construction, and similar design to the PERMS. When the PERMs were converted to DERM (diesel) rail motors in the mid-1950s, the five trailers were also painted in blue and gold to match.

More details: DERM → Trailers

Between April and July 1930, 8, 11, 12, 14, and 16 ABC were converted from locomotive-hauled wooden-bodied bogie passenger carriages, specifically for use with the ten PERM railmotors. The original carriages had been built in 1890 and 1891, as non-corridor, five-compartment, first-class carriages, with a guard's compartment (AD^{AD}, later AC class). They had been extended between 1909 and 1912 by the addition of two more passenger compartments, and were intended to become Dogbox 'M' cars. When that conversion scheme was halted, they were returned to the locomotive-hauled fleet (with varying degrees of conversion evident), and were later converted to second-class (BC) carriages, shortly before becoming railmotor trailers. All were scrapped between 1939 and 1961.

=== Walker trailers ===
Trailer cars 50 - 64 were Walker railmotor trailers, placed in service between 1948 and 1954. They were primarily placed behind the 102 hp (76 kW) and 153 hp (114 kW) railmotor variations, but were occasionally coupled to 280 hp (210 kW) versions. Walker trailers 50 and 51 were originally classed RMT instead of MT, but had been re-classed MT by 1949.

More details: Walker railmotor → Trailers

=== Brill trailer ===
A Brill trailer, numbered was numbered 200, and remained in service until 1984. It is preserved at the Daylesford Spa Country Railway

More details: Brill railmotor → 200MT

=== Other trailers ===
Trailer car 31 was converted from 65ABW in 1981, along with cars 32 to 34 that were converted from similar VFW cars 3, 4 and 6 (built as AW cars).

Cars 31 to 34 were painted in VR blue and gold, but saw service as railmotor trailers for only about 2 or 3 years.

Numbers 40 to 42 were trailers used behind road motor cars which had been converted for rail use.

Numbers 35 to 39, 43 to 49, and 65 to 100 were not used.

=== MTH passenger cars ===
Four MTH cars were originally Harris-type suburban trains but, after Harris trains were taken out of service, a large number of cars were refurbished for use on country trains. Four were converted to MTH cars, for use behind the four DRC railcars. When the DRCs were removed from service, the four MTH's were transferred to the Stony Point line, where they were run behind an A class diesel locomotive. Their last revenue-run was on Saturday, 26 April 2008, and they were put into in storage.

MTH 101 was converted from Harris car 517BT, MTH 102 from Harris car 679T, MTH 103 from Harris car 524BT, and MTH 104 from Harris car 672T.

In 2011, MTH 102 was converted to Infrastructure Evaluation Vehicle IEV102 .

=== 1300TM (VLocity centre cars) ===
The centre cars of V/Line VLocity diesel multiple unit (DMU) sets are sometimes mistakenly considered to be trailer cars. However, unlike the railmotor trailers, they were built to expand existing 2-car VLocity DMU sets into 3-car sets, and are classed TM, numbered in the 1300 range. The centre cars are not trailers because they are equipped with traction motors.

== Demise ==
Trailer cars fell into disuse at the same time as their railmotor counterparts. A number have been placed with heritage rail operators, in particular the Daylesford Spa Country Railway, which specialises in railmotors and trailers.
