= Trentham railway station, Victoria =

Former railway station in Victoria, Australia

Coordinates: 37°23′09″S 144°19′25″E

Trentham
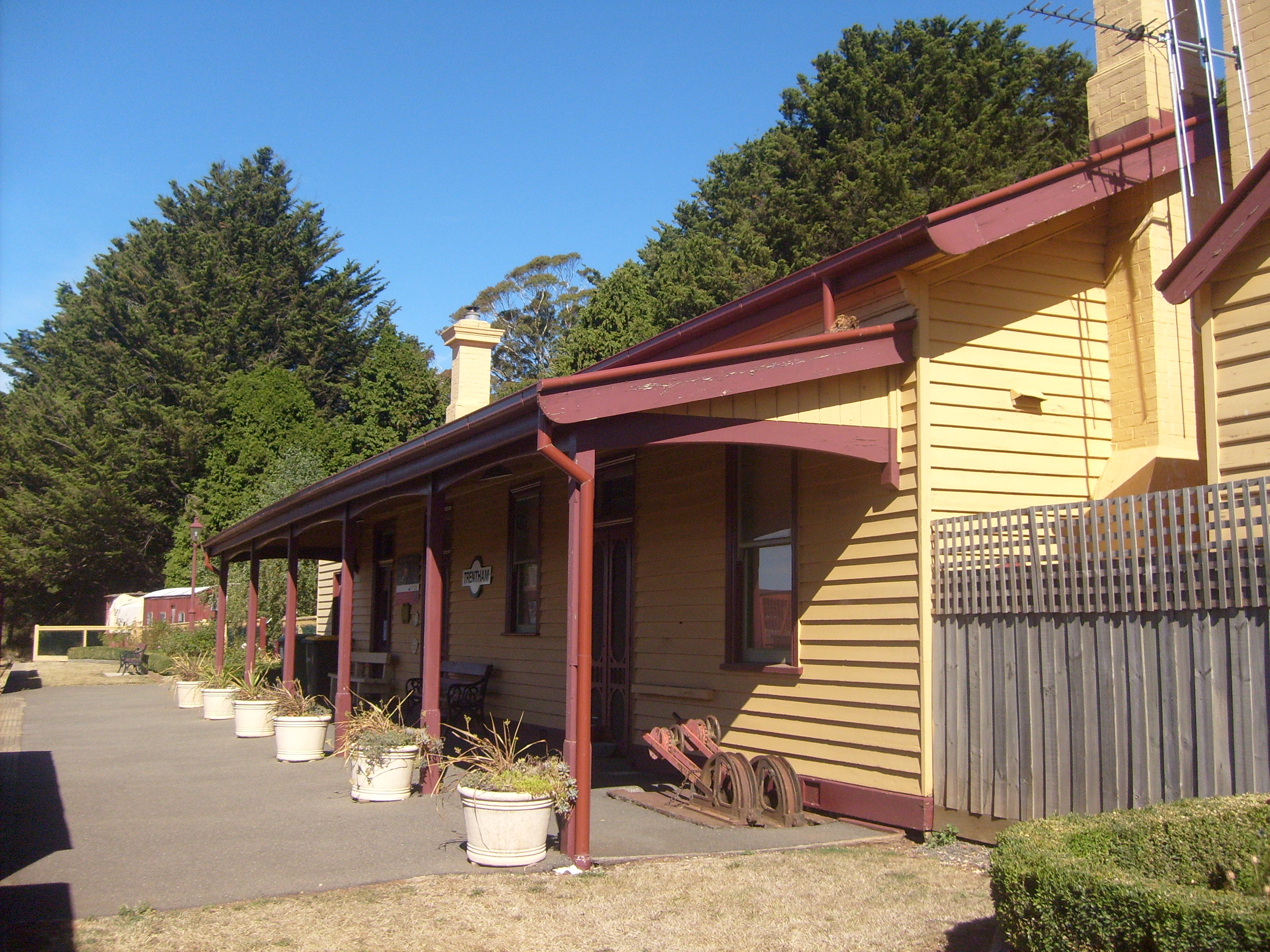

General information
- Line: Daylesford
- Platforms: 1
- Tracks: 5

Other information
- Status: Closed

History
- Opened: 16 February 1880
- Closed: 3 July 1978

Services
Preceding station	Disused railways	Following station
Fern Hill	Daylesford line	Lyonville
	List of closed railway stations in Victoria	
Location

Trentham railway station is a closed railway station in the town of Trentham, Victoria, Australia, on the former Carlsruhe-to-Daylesford line. It opened on Monday, 16 February 1880, and was closed on Monday, 3 July 1978.

In 1969, the platform was 80 metres in length, with an 18.5-metre carriage dock and, in 1975, a crane and weighbridge still existed at the station.

Since the closure of the line, the station building, platform and goods shed, and a short section of track, have all been retained. Tenants live at the station and look after it as a museum. The rail track still exists for 1 km on either side of the station, and some rolling stock has been put on display in the former station yard. Although the rest of the track has been removed, the railway reserve is still zoned for railway use, and the Daylesford Spa Country Railway has plans to restore the track to Trentham from its current terminus at Bullarto.
