= Daylesford railway station =

Railway station in Victoria, Australia

Coordinates: 37°20′30″S 144°09′15″E

Daylesford
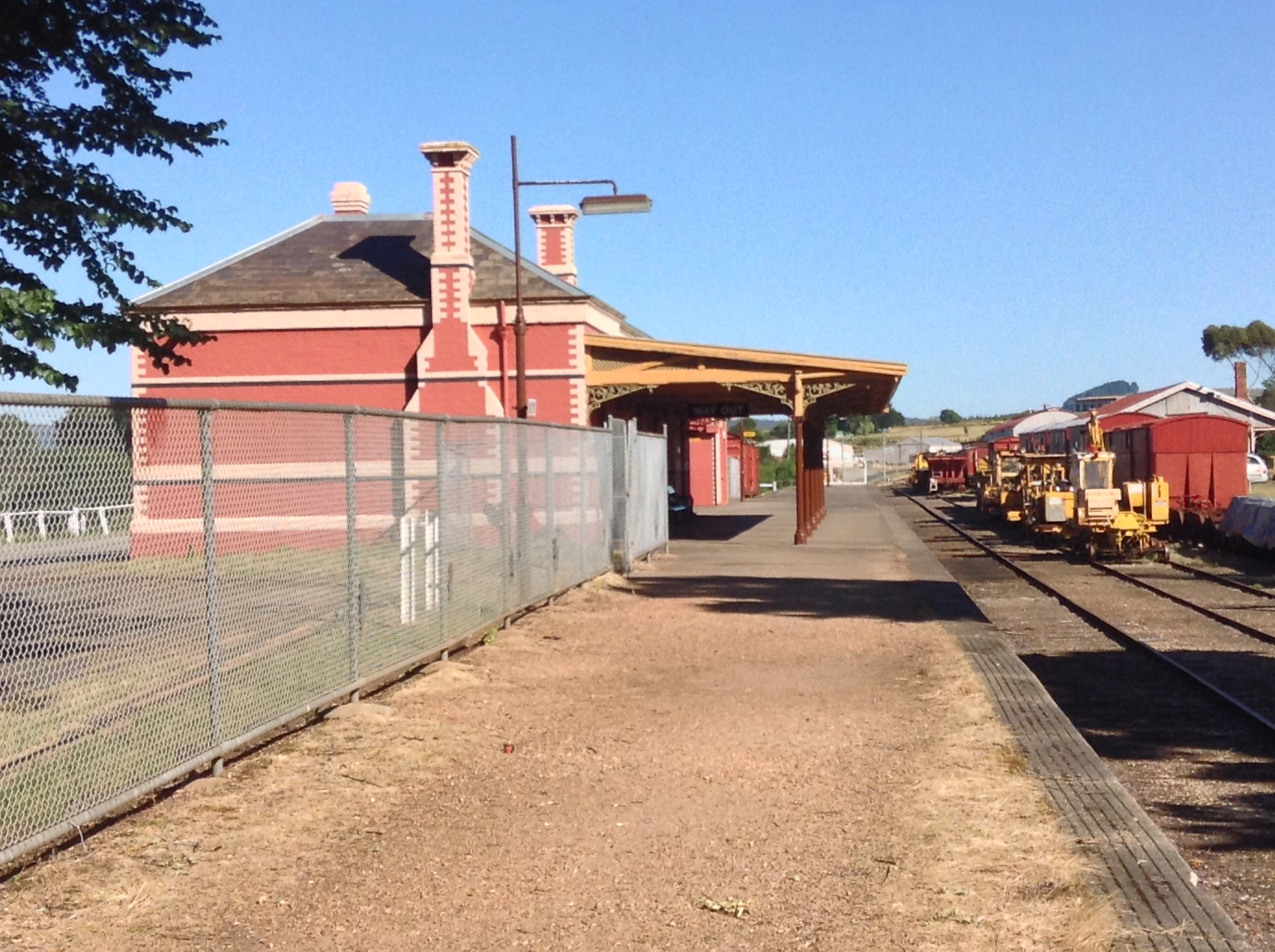

General information
- Location: 121.611 km (75.566 mi) from Flinders Street
- System: Daylesford Spa Country Railway station
- Line: Daylesford
- Platforms: 2
- Tracks: 4

Other information
- Status: Tourist station

History
- Opened: 17 March 1880; 1980 (re-opened)
- Closed: 3 July 1978
Location

Daylesford is a railway station that services the town of Daylesford, Victoria, Australia. Daylesford Station is a substantial brick building used by the Daylesford Spa Country Railway, and the station yard consists of a number of tracks which are used to store heritage rollingstock. A goods shed is also located at the station.

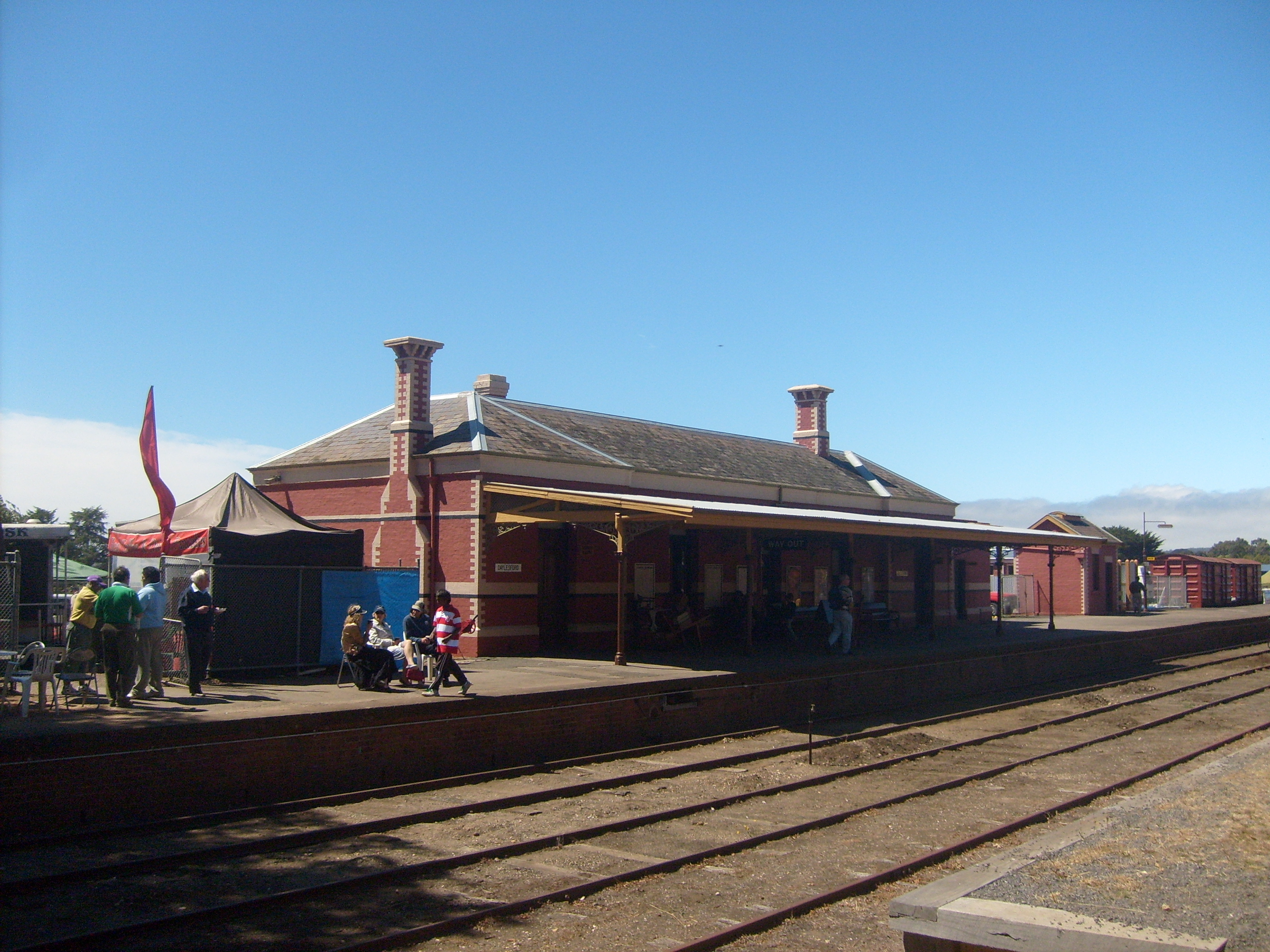

Opened on Wednesday, 17 March 1880, it was closed on Monday, 3 July 1978. During the mid to late 1980s the line reopened for tourist services, gangers trolleys conveyed passengers on short trips to the Wombat State Forest about halfway between Daylesford and Musk. On 15 September 1990 railmotor services were restored between Daylesford and Musk for the first time in 13 years.

Preceding station	Heritage railways	Following station
Musk	Daylesford Spa Country Railway	Terminus
