= Bullarto railway station =

Railway station in Victoria, Australia

Coordinates: 37°23′38″S 144°13′20″E

Bullarto
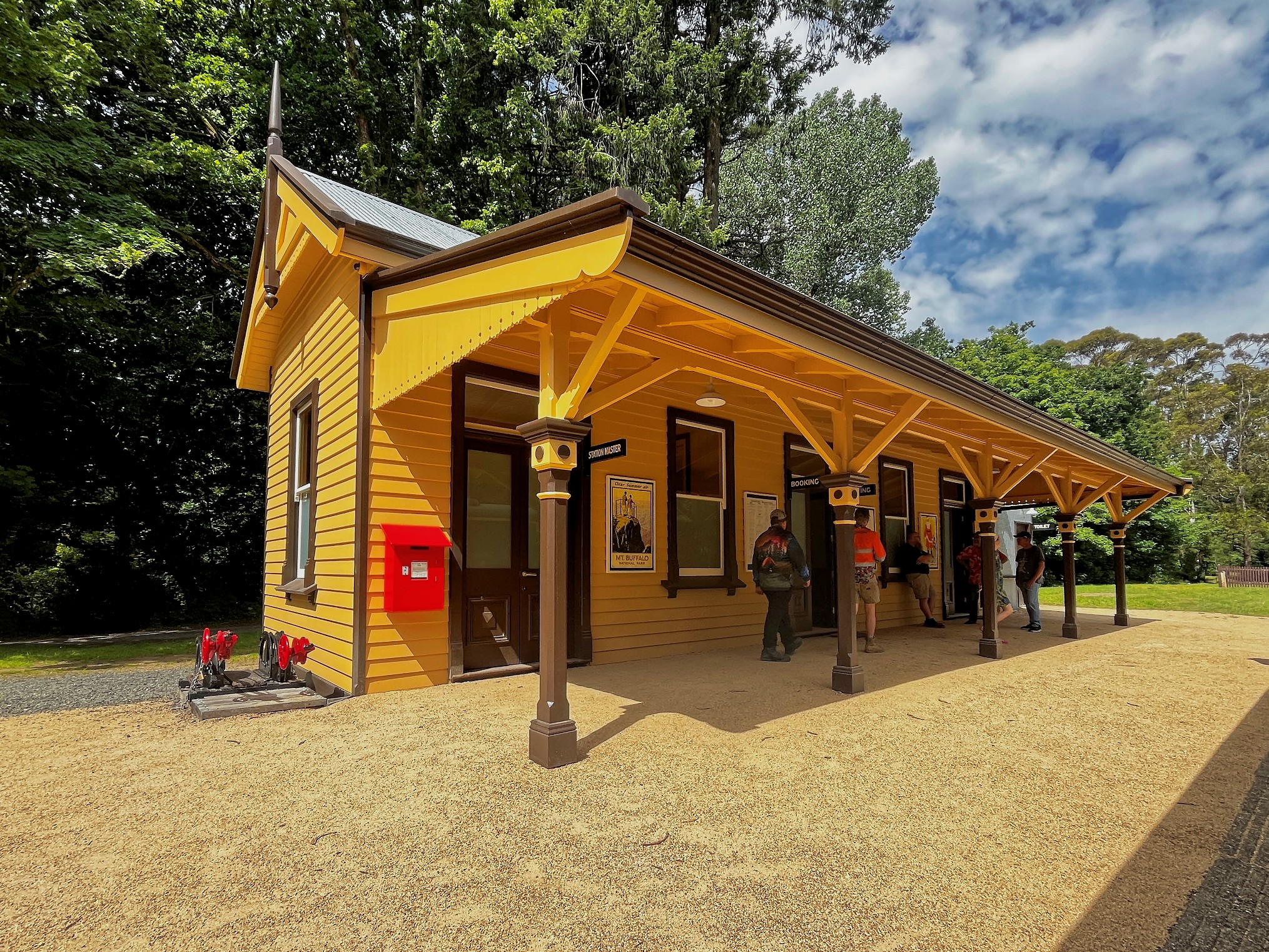
- Bullarto Railway Station

General information
- Location: 112.1 km (69.7 mi) from Flinders Street
- System: Daylesford Spa Country Railway station
- Operator: Daylesford Spa Country Railway
- Line: Daylesford
- Platforms: 1
- Tracks: 1

Other information
- Status: Tourist station

History
- Opened: 17 March 1880; 17 re-opened March 1997
- Closed: 3 July 1978
Location

Bullarto railway station is a railway station on the Daylesford line, in Bullarto, Victoria, Australia. The station opened on Wednesday, 17 March 1880, and closed on Monday, 3 July 1978.

In 1969, the platform was 74m in length and, in 1975, Bullarto was working under no-one-in-charge conditions.

At 747m above sea level, it was the second-highest station on the former Victorian Railways system.

== Re-opening ==
The section of the former Daylesford line between Musk and Bullarto was reopened by the Daylesford Spa Country Railway (DSCR) on 17 March 1997, and Bullarto is the current terminus of DSCR tourist rail motor services. The station platform and portable building have been restored and a run-around loop provided.

Preceding station	Heritage railways	Following station
Lyonville	Daylesford Spa Country Railway	Passing Clouds
Entire line
