= Victorian Railways PL type carriage =

APL, BPL, BCPL type carriages
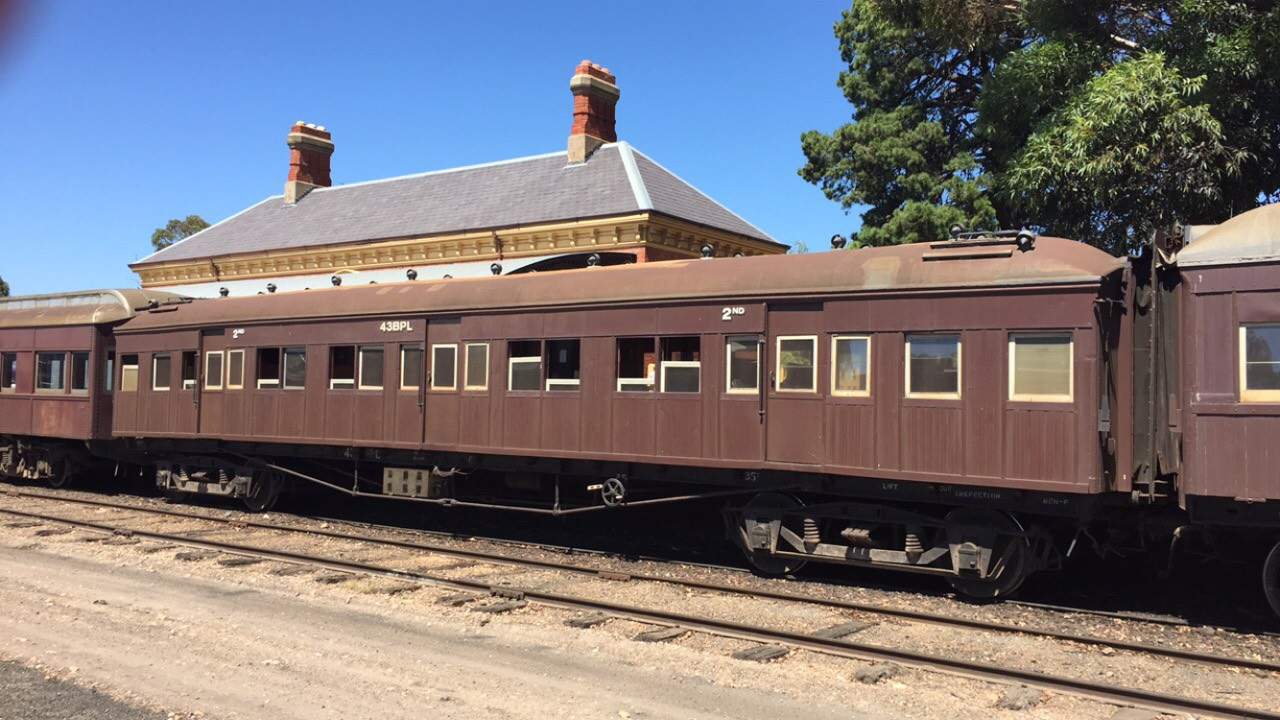
- 43 BPL preserved at the Victorian Goldfields Railway, 2019
- Manufacturer: Victorian Railways
- Constructed: From 1917
- Number built: 141
- Number preserved: 43, 78 & 86BPL & 6, 25, 29 & 30BCPL
- Number scrapped: 134
- Capacity: APL, BPL: 78 or 82 passengers, BCPL: 51 passengers
- Operator: various heritage operators

Specifications
- Car body construction: Timber planks
- Car length: 59 ft 9 in (18.21 m) over body; 61 ft 8 in (18.80 m) over pulling lines
- Width: 9 ft 6 in (2.90 m)
- Height: 12 ft 8 in (3.86 m)
- Weight: 30 LT 0 cwt 0 qtr (30.48 t)
- Axle load: 7 LT 10 cwt 0 qtr (7.62 t)
- Power supply: Axle-mounted generators
- Bogies: 45 ft 6 1/2 in (13.88 m) centres; 10 ft (3.05 m) wheelbase each; 63 ft 10 in (19.46 m) total wheelbase
- Braking system: Westinghouse
- Coupling system: screw, later autocouplers
- Track gauge: 5 ft 3 in (1,600 mm)

The PL type carriages were a series of 141 wooden passenger carriages used on the Victorian Railways (VR) system. They consisted of the first class APL, second class BPL and combination second and guard's van, BCPL's.

== History ==
The Victorian Railways plan for electrification of the Melbourne suburban rail network began in 1914, with the first electrically-operated trains running in 1918. The original concept involved hundreds of country and suburban carriages being rebuilt, swapping bodies and underframes, and splicing or adding compartments, to achieve the required capacity, with a fairly standardised carriage design for each purpose.

By 1919, so many cars had been converted away from regular country traffic that a shortage was being experienced. There were many surplus underframes from carriages that had been converted to swingdoor-type driving motors. They were not suitable for the heavier electric motor equipment, but it was realised that they could be fairly easily fitted with a new car body to become country passenger vehicles. That resulted in the PL-class carriage.

Underframes were lengthened, using splices, from 45 and 50 feet (14 and 15 m) to almost 60 feet (18 m), and new bodies built to suit.

== Development & Construction ==
W. M. Shannon, the CME of the Victorian Railways at the time, supervised a new carriage design utilising the older underframes and other components as deemed possible. The new coaches were distinctive in having arched roofs in lieu of the then-standard clerestory style, as was being used on bogie-wheeled passenger carriages on the Victorian Railways system.

All carriages of the new type were similar, with an intent to build roughly equal numbers of first class (APL) and second class (BPL) cars. The standard design involved a centre aisle cutting through nine compartments, similar to the new Tait trains on the Melbourne suburban rail system. The middle seven compartments had ten seats each in facing pairs of two and three, while the end compartments featured longitudinal bench-seating and toilets. Only three doors per side were installed, reflecting the priority of comfort over reduced dwell times on the country network.

A single compartment (with toilets) at the no.1 end of the carriage was reserved for ladies; at the opposite end of each car, three compartments were reserved for smokers, with brass spittoons recessed into the floor. Sliding doors were fitted at every third compartment along the hallway, with an additional sliding door to separate the five non-smoking compartments from the single ladies' compartment. The partitions fitted with sliding doors were full-height and fitted with luggage racks overhanging the seats, while partitions between back-to-back seats were lower.

Looking from the smoking end towards the ladies' end, the two-seat side was on the right and the three-seat side on the left. The side with fewer seats was the lavatory side, while the side with wider seats was the toilet side.

The new carriage bodies cost around £1000 to build ($2000 plus inflation, around $83,000 per body in 2013 dollars). Standard dimensions for the carriage bodies were 12 ft 8 1/4 in (3,867 mm) high, and an overall width of 9 ft 6 in (2,896 mm). To suit the underframes made available by the electrification project, the new bodies were built in three lengths - 58 ft 0 1/4 in (17.7 m), 58 ft 6 1/2 in (17.8 m) and 59 ft 9 in (18.2 m).

There was no pattern to which underframes were used for which carriage identities or series. The shortest carriages had 78 seats with 10 passengers each in the middle seven compartments, and four each end in the longitudinal sections. The longer two carriage types had 82 seats, with six passengers in each longitudinal section. The carriage types could be identified externally by the number and spacing of windows on the end compartments. From, but not counting, the last side-door, the shortest carriages had three roughly equally-spaced windows; the medium-length cars had a slightly wider spacing between their windows, and the longest cars had an uneven spacing with two windows immediately adjacent to the door, then a gap wide enough for another, then the toilet/washroom window.

Compartments were typically 6 ft (1,829 mm) across, or 6 ft 3 in (1,905 mm) to allow for an entrance door. Seats were 2 ft (610 mm) deep, allowing 2 ft (610 mm) or 2 ft 3 in (686 mm)2'3" between the seats in the appropriate compartments. The hallway was 1 ft (305 mm) across. The end compartments took up the remaining space, with the shortest carriages allowing 3 ft 11 3/4 in (1,213 mm) for two seats each side. The medium-length cars allowed 4 ft 2.875 in (1,292 mm) and the longest cars allowed 4 ft 9.875 in (1,470 mm). The windows of the washroom and lavatory compartments were frosted-white.

All PL cars were fitted with both a toilet and washroom adjacent to the longitudinal-seating sections of the end compartments. They were each 2 ft 10 1/2 in (876 mm) by 3 ft 4 1/2 in (1,029 mm), one either side of the corridor, with separate doors. A small drinking fountain was located against the end walls.

When first released to service, the PL cars were painted a deep maroon/crimson livery with the labels "FIRST" or "SECOND", as appropriate, adjacent to each door, as well as markings for the "SMOKING" and "LADIES" on the sides of the end compartments in a slightly smaller font. Classes were also marked on the carriage doors. They were notable as the only carriages in the VR fleet with the "LADIES" marking externally. The carriage number and class appeared on the centre of both the carriage body and the underframe.

When built, the majority of vehicles rode on bogies with axles spaced 6 ft 6 in (1,981 mm) apart. In the mid-1950s, all cars were converted to bogies with axles at 8 feet (2,400 mm), taken from withdrawn suburban trailers. Although dates are not known, some of the earliest conversions were APL 34, 38 and 40, and BPL 43, 49, 49, 52, 83, 94 and 99.

A majority of carriages retained their Pintsch gas lighting, screw couplings and buffers until the late 1950s. They were replaced around the same time as fitting of connecting diaphragms took place. The latter project involved cutting out the middles of walls at either ends of the carriages and fitting a standard inter-carriage walkway/diaphragm unit to the end in its place, with a door which could be locked by railway staff. Until that time the water fonts for carriages were mounted on the end walls between the lavatory and washroom. When that portion of the wall was removed, the fonts were moved into the lavatory area.

Because of the underframe and body attachment/splicing methods used to create the carriages, the resultant fleet had three distinct body types when introduced intro service. The Ian Wright report chose to identify those as Groups A, B and C, whereas the Victorian Railways mainly noted the carriages' lengths over couplers in the Working Time Table addendums and rarely elsewhere. The report does not identify vehicles 28BPL or 47BPL, but they are listed here in groups A and C respectively as the most likely grouping.

Data	Group A	Group B	Group C
Total	31	38	74
Fleet No's (initial)	APL (1st): 1, 28-33; APL (2nd): 13-20, 50-51; BPL: 42-55	APL (1st): Nil; APL (2nd): 1-5, 8-10, 18, 21-26, 28-49, 54; BPL: Nil	APL (1st): 2-27; APL (2nd): 6-7, 11-12, 52-53; BPL: 1-41
Fleet No's (final)	BPL: 4-46, 48, 49, 50-51, 53-55, 61, 78-79, 81, 83, 85-86, 95-96, 98-99, 101, 124; BCPL: 1, 29-32	BPL: 89-91, 93-94, 100, 102-107, 109-110, 116120, 122, 125, 126; BCPL: 15-20, 22-23, 26	BPL: 1, 3-33, 35-40, 56-60, 63-79, 82, 84, 87; BCPL: 2-8, 21, 24-25, 27-28
Body length	58'0¼"	58'6½"	59'9"
Length over buffers/diaphragms (when coupled)	59'11¼"	60'5½"	61'8
Capacity	78 seats	82 seats	82 seats
Tare	25t. 11c. 1q.	25t. 11c.	25t. 0c. 5q.
Bogies (initial)	6'6"	6'6"	6'6"
Bogie centre-to-centre	41 ft 6¾in	?	?
Exceptions	17, 19APL with pressure flushing, tare = 26t. 5c.; BPL's 43, 48-49, 52, 83, 94 with 8 ft bogies	18, 21-26, 28-33 & 54APL with pressure flushing, tare = 26t. 5c.; APL's 34, 38, 40 & 99BPL with 8 ft bogies	Hospital/Jubilee train; 61BPL

== Introduction to service ==
- -- Door types, recycling sliding-door components?

=== APL ===
1APL entered service at the end of 1918, with classmates (both first- and second-class) entering service every few weeks until 1923. It is thought that the underframe used for 1APL came from carriage 2BC. That carriage body was converted to swing-door suburban motor car 2ABCM, later 156M, the Jolimont Workshops shunting car.

The initial design called for the side doors on each carriage to slide, like the Tait train design. However, in the faster country services, with generally rougher track, those doors tended to cause draughts and slide open regularly, causing passenger complaints. By the time that problem was recognised, carriages had been produced up to 33APL. Before 27APL was released to service, its sliding doors were replaced with swing doors, matching the earlier designs. That proved a success, and so all except 27APL were recoded to second class (BPL), and new carriages 1APL-26APL and 28APL-54APL were built with swing doors.

As a result, although the class never grew beyond APL 54, a total of 87 individual carriages carried the APL code.

The original APL sliding-door fleet became BPL cars 56-87, in no particular order.

In 1932 and 1933, fifteen APL cars were converted to BPL. Second-series APL cars 48, 3, 5, 9, 13, 7, 8, 16, 50, 53, 6, 10, 11, 49 and 15 took BPL numbers 28 and 47 (replacing cars since destroyed) and 88-100. Of those cars, 89, 93 and 99BPL were restored to their previous APL identities in 1949-50. All bar 47, 90, 95 and 98BPL returned to the APL classification from 1952 to 1954, with the last four stragglers returning to the APL classification from 1958 to 1960.

In 1953, 25APL was scrapped following fire damage at the Dudley Street carriage sidings.

From the late 1950s, a large number of APL carriages were retrofitted with pressure-flushed toilets in lieu of the normal drop toilet design. Vehicles known to include that feature were 17-26, 28-33 and 54APL.

In the mid 1960s, it was decided that first-class travellers deserved a better level of service than was being provided by the APL fleet, so those cars were downgraded to second class. The majority were simply reclassified to BPL and renumbered in the series 88-126, with no reference to previous BPL identities, though 8APL returned to 92BPL by chance. Some cars were converted straight to BCPL: cars 11, 53, 52, 27, 6, 12, 7, 34, 39, 5, 41, 37 and 36 were converted second-class composite guards' vans in 1966-1967, and entered service as 2BCPL-14BCPL.

==== 25MT/1BCPL ====
In 1928, APL 20 (hinged-door, 58 ft 0 1/4 in (17.7 m) over body) was converted to a railmotor trailer, coded 25MT, with buffers and hook-couplings removed and replaced with automatic couplers. It was used as a supplement to the DERM trailer fleet. The conversion involved removal of three compartments at the smoking end, and reworking of nearly all the others. The end ladies' compartment was left unchanged with room for four passengers on two longitudinal seats. The second compartment had swing doors installed, in lieu of compartment 3. External swing-doors were retained in compartment 5, and compartment 6 became the smoking section. Compartments two through five each had ten seats in the standard 2+3 arrangement, using parts from Tait carriages. As a result seats adjacent to the centre aisle did not have armrests on that side. Compartment 6 had seating for seven; the van-end three-seat was removed and a door cut into that partition, forming an access to the men's washroom and lavatory in a single compartment; the men's water font was on the smoking-compartment side of this wall. The van of 1BCPL took the space formerly occupied by compartments 7-9, with an internal length of 19'2". offset sliding and two-piece guards' doors and a parcel shelf. The car had capacity for 51 passengers plus a guard and up to four tons of luggage.

In 1940, the buffers and hook-couplings were restored, and the car recoded to 1BCPL. As 1BCPL, the car was primarily used on trains to White City, with the van section being used for greyhounds. In the 1950s, the van was reallocated to Warrnambool, for use on the local mixed trains running to Dennington for employees at the Nestle's plant there. End vestibules are thought to have been fitted to 1BCPL in the mid 1950s, around the same time as the rest of the PL fleet.

As of the early 1960s 1BCPL was usually employed on the 5:04pm train from Spencer Street to Woodend; its use to Geelong on 30 March 1961 at 5:10pm was deemed noteworthy, and the Woodend train used a ZP van in lieu.

=== BPL cars ===
The number group was eventually 1 - 126, including conversions from the first class cars.

The BPL carriages, which were affectionately known as "Bouncing Passenger Lounges," had been removed from service by the early 1980s.

==== Original cars ====
An initial fleet of fifty-five BPL carriages were built between 1919 and 1921, identical in design to the swing-door design used with 27APL.

Shortly following the completion of those cars, the flaw of the first-class sliding door design was recognised and those carriages were reclassed as BPL 56 to 87, allowing new cars to be built as first-class swing door types. Those conversions ran from 1923.

Carriages 28BPL and 47BPL were destroyed in a fire at Warrnambool in 1925.

In 1932 and 1933, additional second-class capacity was required, so fifteen randomly selected APL swing-door carriages were reclassed to BPL, taking numbers 28, 47 and 88-100 BPL. That is why some sources erroneously indicate that 28BPL and 47BPL were being rebuilt.

As noted below, twelve BPL carriages were allocated to special duties in the period 1939 to 1961.

Separate to those, the fifteen APL-to-BPL conversions were shifted back to the APL fleet in three batches, recovering their original APL fleet numbers in 9, 16, 49APL in 1949-50; 48, 5, 7, 8, 50, 6, 10 and 15APL in 1952-54 and 3, 13, 53 and 11APL in 1958-1960.

Additionally 49BPL was scrapped in 1953 following damage at Tynong. This latter scrapping is recorded as 14 August 1953, the same date that 25APL was scrapped following damage at Moriac.

==== 1942 Hospital carriages, 1951 Jubilee Train ====
During World War II, carriage 82BPL (sliding door, previously 26APL #1) was withdrawn from service for conversion to a hospital carriage. It had its seats removed and replaced with thirteen triple-bunk beds, for a capacity of 39 patients. Externally, it was painted all-over moonstone grey, as used around the windows of electric suburban trains at the time, and all windows, except those in the middle door, were painted white. Red crosses on white circles were painted on both sides of the roof, and large red crosses were applied on the sides of the carriage between compartments 3 and 4 and 5 and 6. Internally, everything seems to have been painted white, except the floor, light fittings and beds.

The car proved to be useful in service so, in 1941-42, a further ten BPL cars were converted. Cars 36, 38, 51, 58, 60, 72, 74, 75 and 98BPL became Hospital Cars in a very similar fashion to 82BPL, except that they were fitted with only twelve triple-bunk beds (36 berths), as well as 24 lockers for personal belongings in each car, and they were fitted with end connecting diaphragms. It is not known whether 82BPL had lockers or, if so, how many. Additionally, 57BPL was converted to a staff car with end diaphragms, though not much is known about its internal configuration.

There are two possibilities: either a hospital train was formed using those eleven carriages or, when the A/BPL fleet was divided into Troop Trains during World War II, each "nine or ten-car" train was allocated one hospital carriage for injured troops. The troop trains allowed the Army Movement Control to plan troop movements without the railway department worrying about having to shuffle or acquire normal passenger stock. Originally, the troop trains ran primarily to Albury, Tocumwal, Serviceton and Bairnsdale. Later, it is known that they ran to Terowie and Port Pirie on the South Australian Railways network.

It is possible that the Hospital Train returned to passenger service for a few years after 1947, but that is unlikely, given the later conversion to the Jubilee Train which would have required near-empty shells. If any of the cars did revert, 57BPL and 82BPL are the most likely candidates, because they were different from the rest.

In 1950-51, the carriages had berths removed, making them empty shells, and were rebuilt into the Jubilee Train, which celebrated 50 years of Federation. The carriages were repainted externally into green with gold and paired with locomotive N 430, painted in a similar livery. Locomotive N 432 at the Newport Railway Museum has been repainted into the Jubilee livery for many years, even though that engine never wore the green and gold scheme in service.

The Jubilee train was fitted internally with a series of displays of state produce and examples of achievements, and was run across most lines in both suburban and country areas to allow locals in 66 towns to explore and learn. The train ran first to South Australia between July 30 and October 7, 1951. Following that, it was transferred back to Victoria and continued its journey in "native" territory.

Four photographs of the Jubilee Train touring South Australia are available online:

After the final runs of the Jubilee train, the carriages were restored to normal passenger service.

72BPL was badly damaged in the fire at Dudley St car sidings on 3 December 1952.

==== "Royalty in Photographs" carriage 61BPL ====
- TBA

==== Generator Test Carriage 66BPL ====
- http://pjv101.net/fts/u01/ai443.jpg

==== ex-APL second cycle ====
When the majority of the APL fleet was reclassified to BPL in the mid 1960s, the APL cars previously coded BPL were generally not given their old "BPL" number back. This led to the same BPL number being occupied by different cars thirty years later. Further, after the first batch of APL-BPL conversions was reversed, the numbers BPL 28 and 47 were not re-filled.

APL carriages 1–4, 8-10, 13-19, 21-24, 26, 38-33, 35, 38, 40, 42-51 and 54 became BPL carriages 88–126. Of those, only 8APL returned to its previous identity of 92BPL, and that was pure coincidence. The other surviving APL cars were converted straight to BCPL.

==== BCPL conversions ====
The first APL to BCPL conversions were completed in 1966. Around the same time the remaining APL fleet was being renumbered into the BPL series; after 14BCPL was converted from 36APL on 1 August 1967 (and a month later, a straggling 8BCPL ex 7APL), further conversions were sourced from the BPL fleet. BPL cars 112, 92, 115, 114, 121, 113, 34, 111, 88, 62, 2, 108, 80, 41, 52, 45, 97 and 123 were converted to BCPL no's 15-32 at a rate of about three per year (more in 1971, fewer in 1972 and 1973), mostly released to service in numerical order.

=== BCPL cars ===
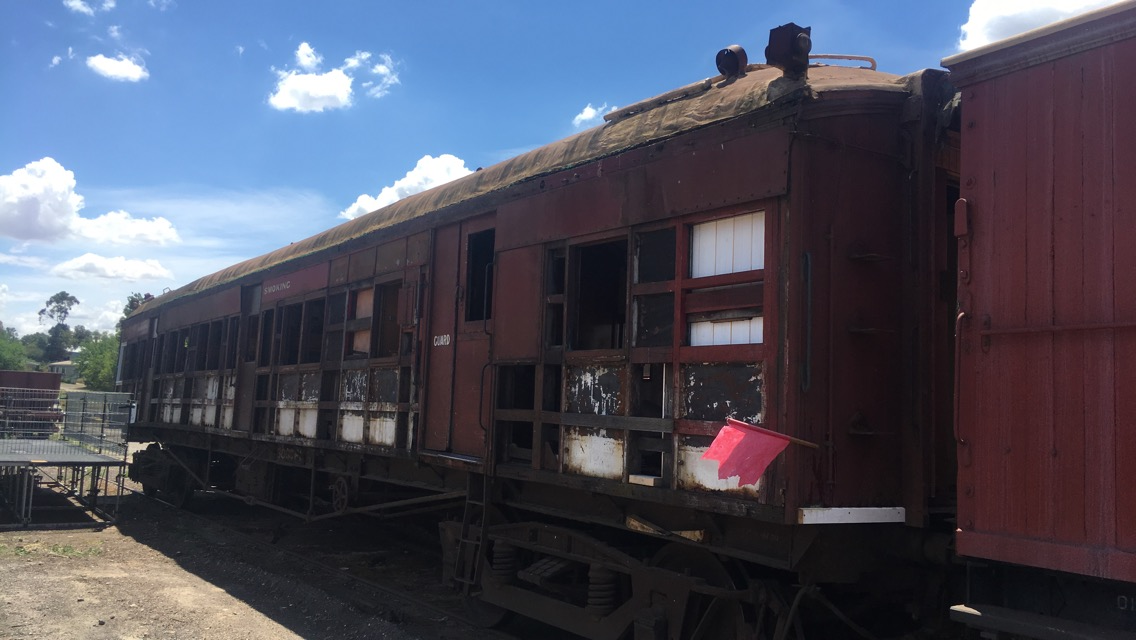
30 BCPL under restoration at the Victorian Goldfields Railway, 2018

As outlined above, in 1928 APL 20 was converted to 25MT. In 1940, the car was recoded to BCPL 1. It was the only BCPL car until 1966.

The idea was to reduce the tonnage of short haul interurban trains by incorporating a guards van into a carriage rather than adding a dedicated guards van.

The first APL to BCPL conversions were completed in 1966. 2BCPL, formerly 11APL (2nd) (and for a few years, 98BPL 1st), entered service on 16 June of that year as a trial. Unlike the other member of the class, 2BCPL was only slightly changed from its previous identity. A single compartment at the Smoking end was walled off from the rest of the carriage and had its seats removed. That end compartment had the standard guards' equipment put in place, with a desk and a small area for vangoods storage. Taildiscs were added to both ends of the carriage for end-of-train marking in daylight, and for night red lamps were added on the four roof corners. Access to the guard's compartment was by a single door on either side of the carriage; from the guard's end looking towards the ladies' end, the left-side guard's door took the former place of the men's toilet, while the right-hand side door took the place of the former window for the ninth compartment, adjacent to the former longitudinal seat on that side of the carriage. Both fitted doors were smooth-panelled and split at half-height allowing the guard to lean out of the train to observe signals and display flags as necessary. An assortment of handrails were provided, though it seems no additional steps were provided for a guard to step up to his compartment from ground level, so he may have been required to step on the bogie axle boxes.

When 2BCPL proved to be a success, further carriages were converted, much to the same design. From November 1966, a further twelve APL carriages, not yet re-classified to BPL, entered the workshops for conversion to BCPL. 14BCPL, numerically the last of this batch, entered service on 1 August 1967, though 8BCPL was delayed until 1 September 1967 for unknown reasons.

Further conversions to BCPL came from the BPL series. BCPL cars 15-17 entered service in 1968, followed by 18-20 in 1969 and 21-23 in 1970, being converted from BPL cars 112, 92, 115, 114, 121, 113, 34, 111 and 88 respectively. After that the pattern changes; 24BCPL ex 62BPL started running on 2 April 1971, but was quickly followed by both 25 and 26BCPL ex 2BPL and 108BPL, both entering service on 26 July 1971, and 27BCPL and 28BCPL entering service on October 28 and 21 of the same year. Photographs indicate that the door placement on at least 25, 27 and 28BCPL was slightly different to that of the earlier vehicles, which may indicate other changes to the design and/or, in conjunction with delivery dates, that the entire 24-28BCPL batch had this variant. (Photographs of 26BCPL are not available at time of writing, and photographs of 24BCPL are cropped or from the wrong side to indicate any difference.) Also worth note is that these vans do not appear to have frosted windows on the left side at the guard's end, indicating that some of the passenger facilities may have been removed, if they had in fact been present in the earlier BCPL builds.

Another year followed before 29BCPL was converted from 52BPL, on 10 November 1972. 30BCPL followed ex 45BPL on 7 December, and 31BCPL and 32BCPL ex 97BPL and 123BPL on 20 February 1973 and 21 June 1973. These last four cars were significantly different, being referred to as the "large van" type in various enthusiast circles as more compartments were sacrificed for a larger guard compartment, served by additional doors for loading of larger parcels.

==== Dance Car ====
In 1977, 11BCPL was converted to a "Dance Car" for special train trips. The seats were removed allowing the car to become one large dance floor.

== Fleet numbers ==
Original plan: approx. 50x APL, approx. 50x BPL 1923-1928: 54x APL, 87x BPL

- -- 28BPL and 47BPL burned 1925
- -- 20APL to 25MT 1928

1928-1932: 1x MT, 53x APL, 85x BPL, 2x withdrawn

- -- 15x APL to BPL

1933-1955: 1x MT/BCPL, 38x APL, 100x BPL, 2x withdrawn

- -- 25MT to 1BCPL
- -- 25APL and 49BPL scrapped 1953
- -- 3x BPL to APL
- -- 8x BPL to APL
- -- 4x BPL to APL

1955-1966: 1x BCPL, 52x APL, 84x BPL, 4x withdrawn

- -- 39x APL to BPL (8APL back to 92BPL, all others new numbers) (ex. ex APL^{2}'s 1-4, 8-10, 13-19, 21-24, 26, 28-33, 35, 38, 40, 42-51, 54) 1967-1968
- -- 13x APL to BCPL (ex APL^{2}'s 5-7, 11-12, 27, 34, 36-37, 39, 41, 52, 53) 1966-1969
- -- 6x BPL to BCPL (ex BPL 92, 112-115, 121) 1968-1969

1969-1970: 20x BCPL, 117x BPL, 4x withdrawn

- -- 12x BPL to BCPL (ex BPL 2, 34, 41, 45, 52, 62, 80, 88, 97, 108, 111, 123) 1970-1973
- -- BPL withdrawn 1970: 86, 101 (x2)
- -- BPL withdrawn 1971: 5, 6, 8, 18, 40, 46, 51, 64, 82, 98, 102, 109 (x12)
- -- BPL withdrawn 1972: 13, 32, 39, 44, 48, 56, 63 (x7)
- -- BPL withdrawn 1973: 11, 25, 59, 61, 69, 71, 74, 77-79, 93, 95 (x12)

1973: 32x BCPL, 72x BPL, 37x withdrawn

- -- BPL withdrawn 1974: 27, 33, 72, 119 (x4)
- -- BPL withdrawn 1975: Nil
- -- BPL withdrawn 1976: 36, 60, 83, 122 (x4)
- -- BPL withdrawn 1977: 26, 29, 66 (x3)
- -- 11BCPL converted to Dance Car (1977)

1977: 31x BCPL, Dance Car, 61x BPL, 48x withdrawn

- -- 1978 withdrawals: BCPL 1, 10, 23 (x3), BPL 3, 16, 35, 37, 53, 96, 100, 107, 118, 124 (x10)
- -- 1979 withdrawals: Nil
- -- 1980 withdrawals: BCPL 4, 12, 18, 22, 26 (x5), BPL 87, 99 (x2)
- -- 1981 withdrawals: BCPL 7 (x1), BPL 17, 42 (x2)

1981 (New Deal): 22x BCPL, Dance Car, 47x BPL, 71x withdrawn

- -- 1982 withdrawals: BCPL 2-3, 5, 8-9, 13-17, 19-21, 24-25, 27 (x16), BPL 1, 4, 7, 9-10, 12, 14-15, 19-24, 30-31, 50, 57-58, 67-68, 76, 81, 90, 94, 103-106, 110, 116-117, 120, 125-126 (x35)
- -- 1983 withdrawals: BCPL 6, Dance Car, 28, 30, 31, 32 (x6), BPL 55, 65, 84-85, 89 (x5)
- -- 1984 withdrawals: BPL 38, 43, 54, 70, 73, 75, 91 (x7)
- -- 1985 withdrawals: Nil
- -- 1986 withdrawals: Nil

1986 (V/Line): 1x BCPL, 140x withdrawn

- -- 1987 withdrawals: Nil
- -- 1988 withdrawals: BCPL 29 (x1)

== Demise ==
After World War II, the Victorian Railways was seriously run-down, with old rollingstock and a lack of maintenance. As a result, patronage began to fall and, combined with greater motor car travel, the need for local train services fell very quickly.

That, combined with the age of the PL series of passenger cars, caused scrapping to begin in 1978, which lasted until 1988. The cars were removed earlier than many other classes, because, with their lighter construction, they could only handle a maximum drawbar load of 360 tonnes trailing, as opposed to 900 tonnes for the other timber passenger car classes.

== Preservation ==
Both the Victorian Goldfields Railway and the Mornington Tourist Railway possess PL-series carriages.

The former has BPL 43 and BCPL's 16, 25, 29 and 30. The latter has BCPL 6 and BPL's 78 and 86. Aside from BPL 43, these carriages have all had other identities; respectively, APL 8/BPL 92, BPL 2, BPL 52, BPL 45, APL 6/BPL 96, APL 28 and APL 29. Effectively, four BPLs and two of each type of APL exist.

Carriage's BPL 14, 42, 54, 55, 57, BCPL 4 & 11 exist in private ownership or used for private accommodation.
