= Daylesford Abbey =

Norbertine abbey in Paoli, Pennsylvania

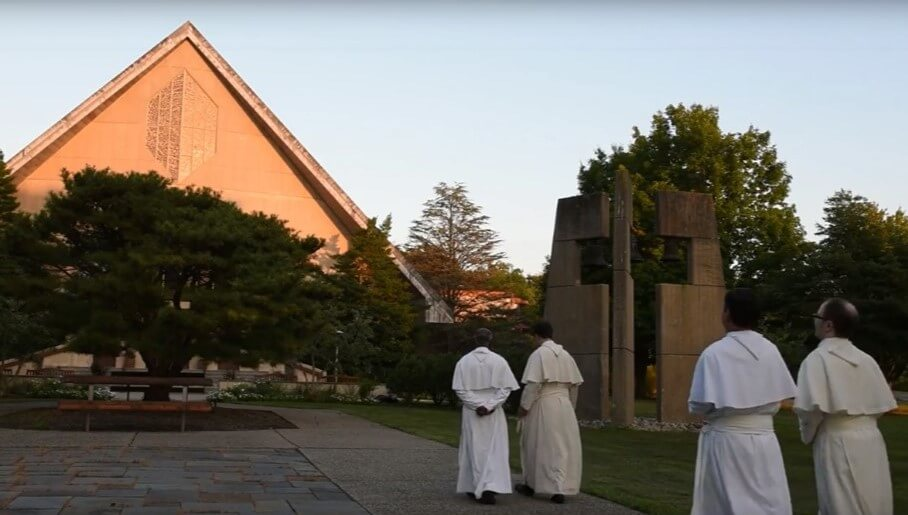
- Norbertines entering the Abbey Church

- Location within Pennsylvania

Monastery information
- Order: Order of Premontre (O.Praem.)
- Established: 1954
- Mother house: St. Norbert Abbey, Green Bay, Wisconsin
- Diocese: Roman Catholic Archdiocese of Philadelphia

People
- Founders: Abbot Bernard Pennings, O. Praem
- Abbot: Rt. Rev. Domenic Rossi, O. Praem.
- Prior: Fr. John Zagarella, O. Praem.

Site
- Location: Paoli, Pennsylvania, USA
- Coordinates: 40.0299°N 75.4841°W
- Public access: Yes
- Website: www.daylesford.org

Daylesford Abbey is a Catholic abbey of Norbertines in Paoli, Pennsylvania, about 20 miles west of Philadelphia.

It is one of two Norbertine abbeys founded by Abbot Bernard Pennings of De Pere, Wisconsin. Pennings was a Norbertine sent from Berne Abbey, Netherlands, who founded the Norbertines in the United States.

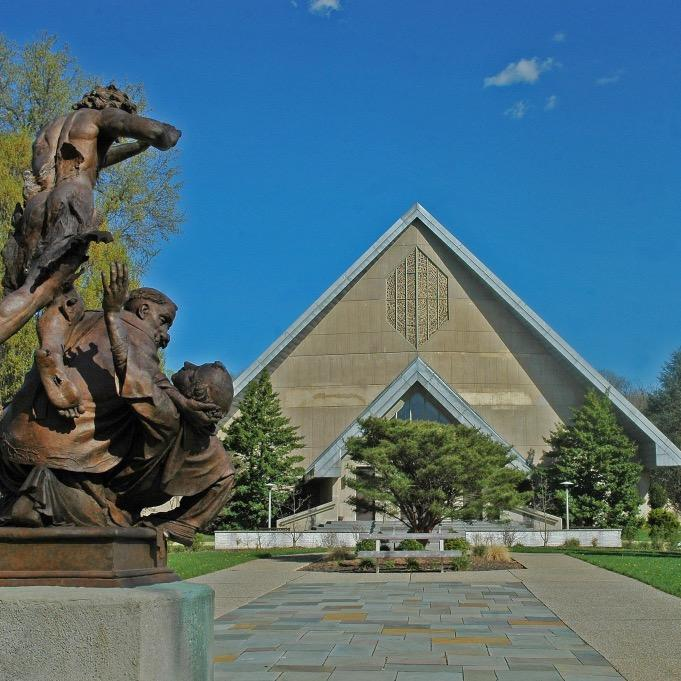
Daylesford Abbey, near Philadelphia.

== History ==
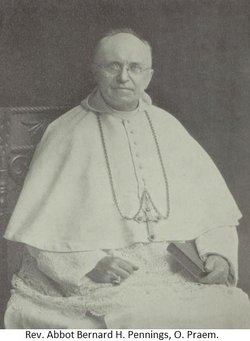
Dutch-born Bernard Pennings, founder of the Premonstratensians in the United States

In 1893, Norbertine priests, led by Bernard Pennings, came from Berne Abbey in the Netherlands to the United States to establish an abbey in De Pere, Wisconsin. Pennings established a network of Norbertine schools and parishes, establishing St. Norbert College as a seminary, then a college of business. In 1898, St. Joseph Parish in West De Pere became affiliated with the Norbertines and served as the abbey church for decades.

In 1932, Abbot Pennings sent a handful of Norbertines from Wisconsin to Delaware and purchased "The Patio", the estate of industrialist John J. Raskob in Claymont. At "The Patio", the Norbertines founded Archmere Academy, a college preparatory school for boys.

In 1934, following the success of Archmere Academy in Delaware, the Norbertines were asked to open an archdiocesan high school for boys in South Philadelphia, which was founded as Southeast Catholic High School (known today as Saints Neumann Goretti High School). Eventually, many students at both of the schools developed interest in becoming Norbertines. In 1954, at the Cassatt Estate in Daylesford, Pennsylvania, a new priory (with a seminary program) was established.

In 1956, the priory built Saint Norbert Parish in Paoli, Pennsylvania. In 1963, the Community moved from the Cassatt Estate to Pinebrook, its present site, an 88-acre farm in Paoli. The abbey church and residence buildings were completed in 1966. The church was blessed on August 15, 1967, and dedicated to Our Lady of the Assumption.

== Liturgy and architecture ==
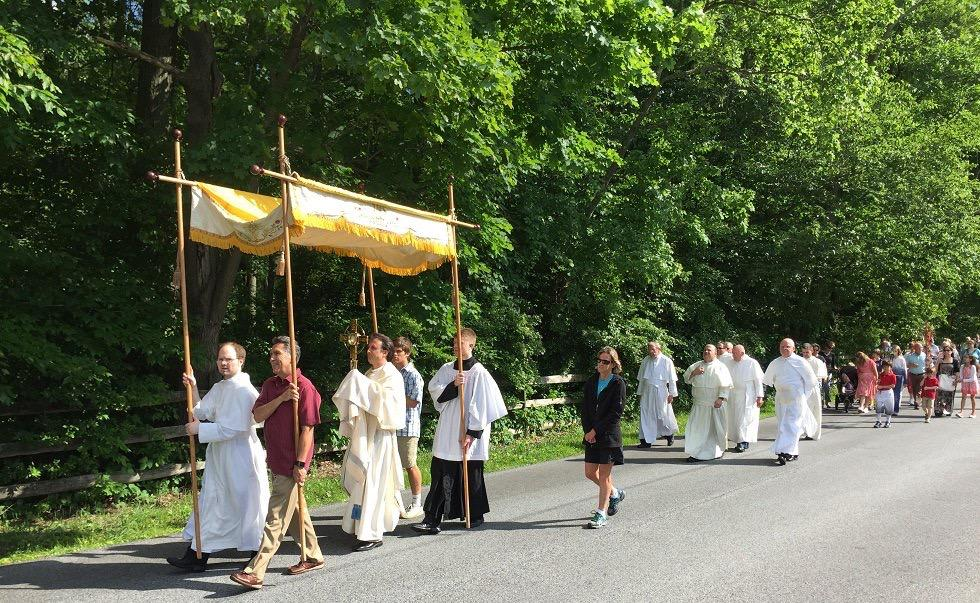
A eucharistic procession on the grounds of the abbey.

The Norbertine Order is known for the solemnity of its liturgies, reflecting Norbert's devotion to the Eucharist. Members of the community wear the order's traditional white habit in church. The community chants the daily office from its own liturgical books in English each day, with Marian hymns chanted in Latin.

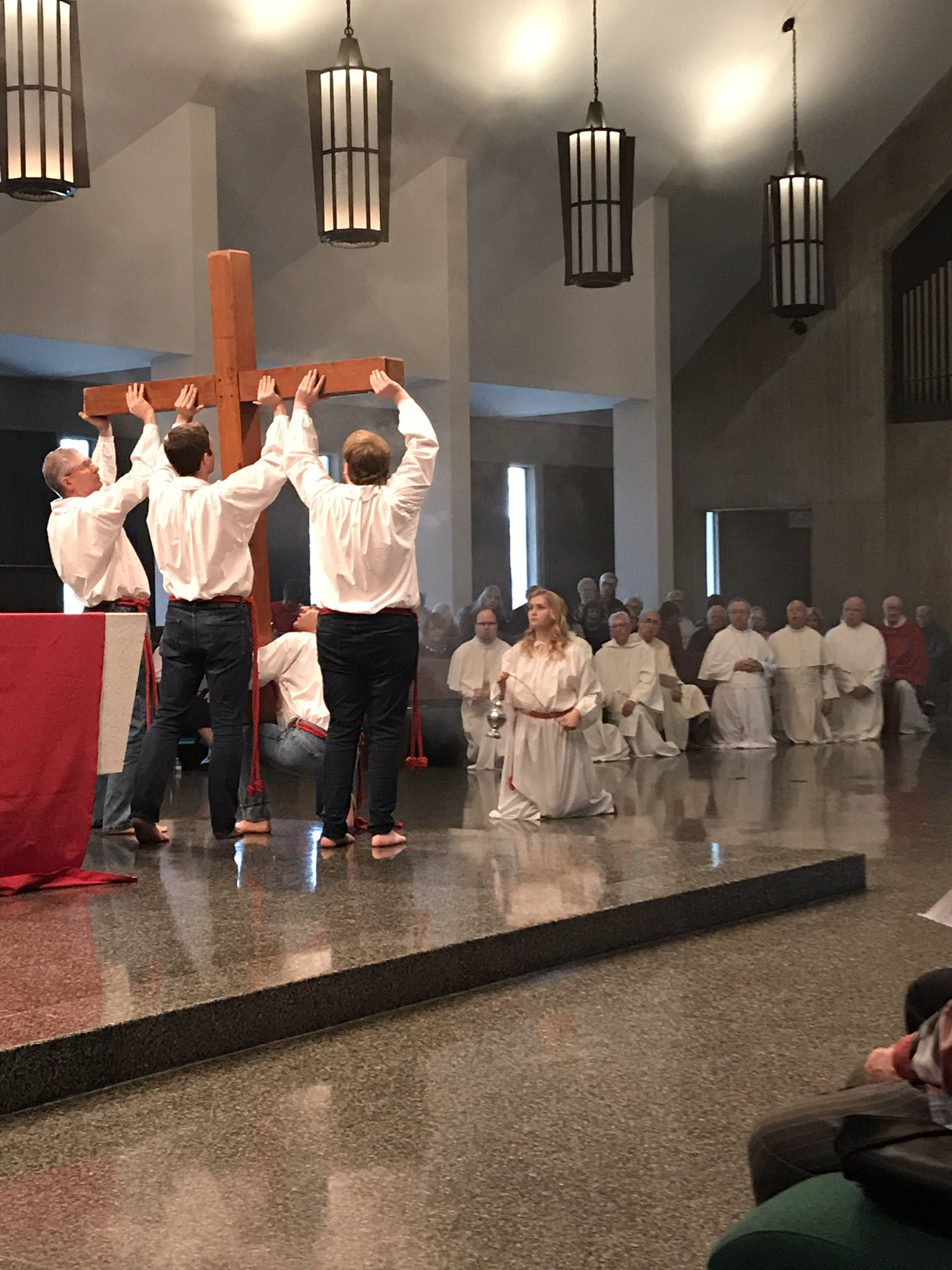
The Veneration of the Cross at the Easter Vigil

=== Design ===
The abbey is situated on 88 acres (0.36 km^{2}) in Paoli, Pennsylvania, in the Archdiocese of Philadelphia.

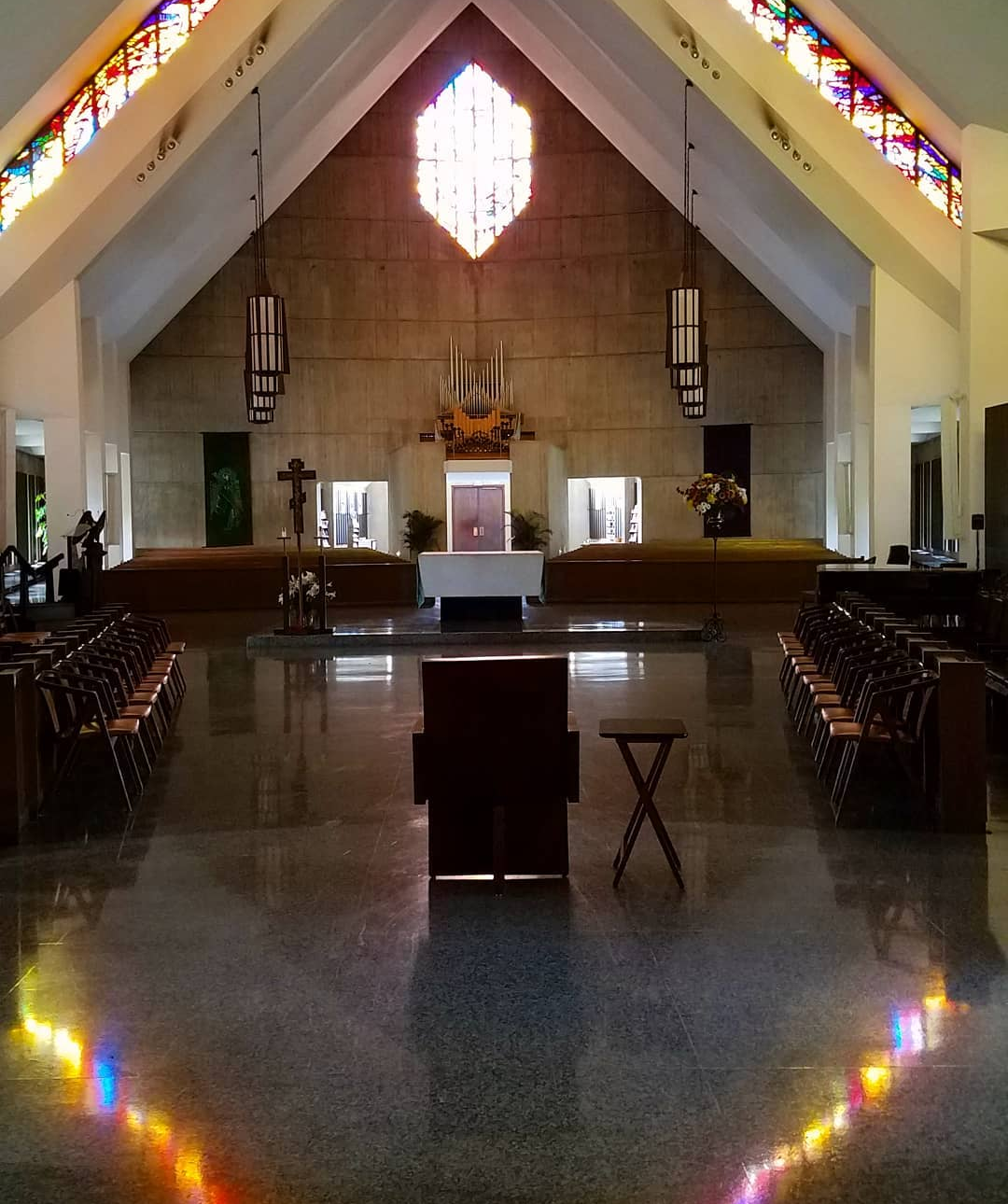
Abbey church

The abbey church was completed in the years during Second Vatican Council. It reflects the Liturgical Movement and the reforms of the council, as interpreted with the norms of Catholic tradition in mind. The abbey church is built in a basilica style, with a well-appointed nave and a wide choir. The design is based on the footprint of centuries-old European Norbertine and Cistercian monasteries, with the materials utilized in constructing it selected for their permanence.

The design overall reflects the Cistercian ideals of Norbertine founder Norbert of Xanten's friend, Saint Bernard of Clairvaux. In the lifetime of Bernard and Norbert, the Cistercians represented a similar movement for ecclesiastical reform as Norbert's Premonstratensians.

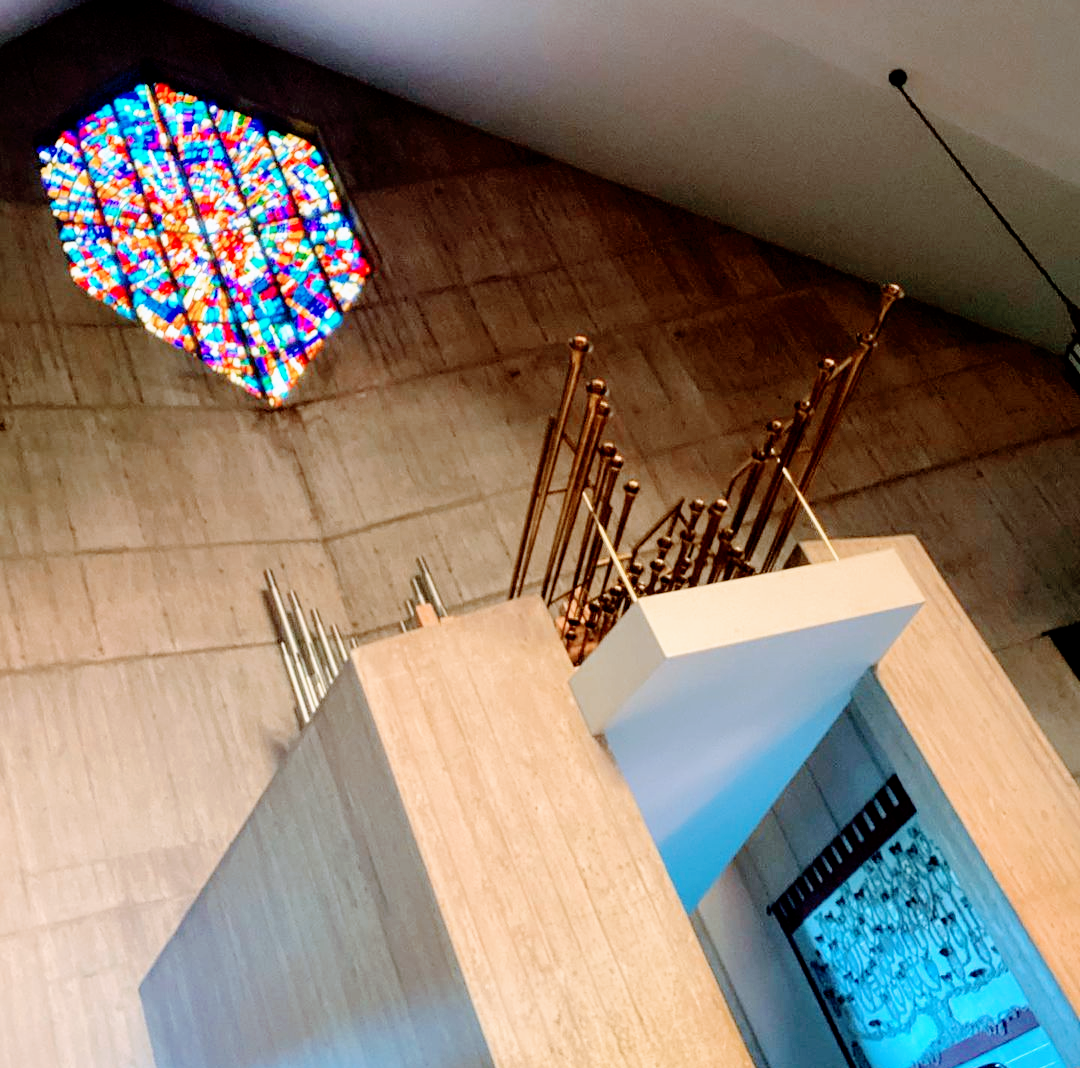
Rose window

=== Pipe organs ===
==== Main church organ ====
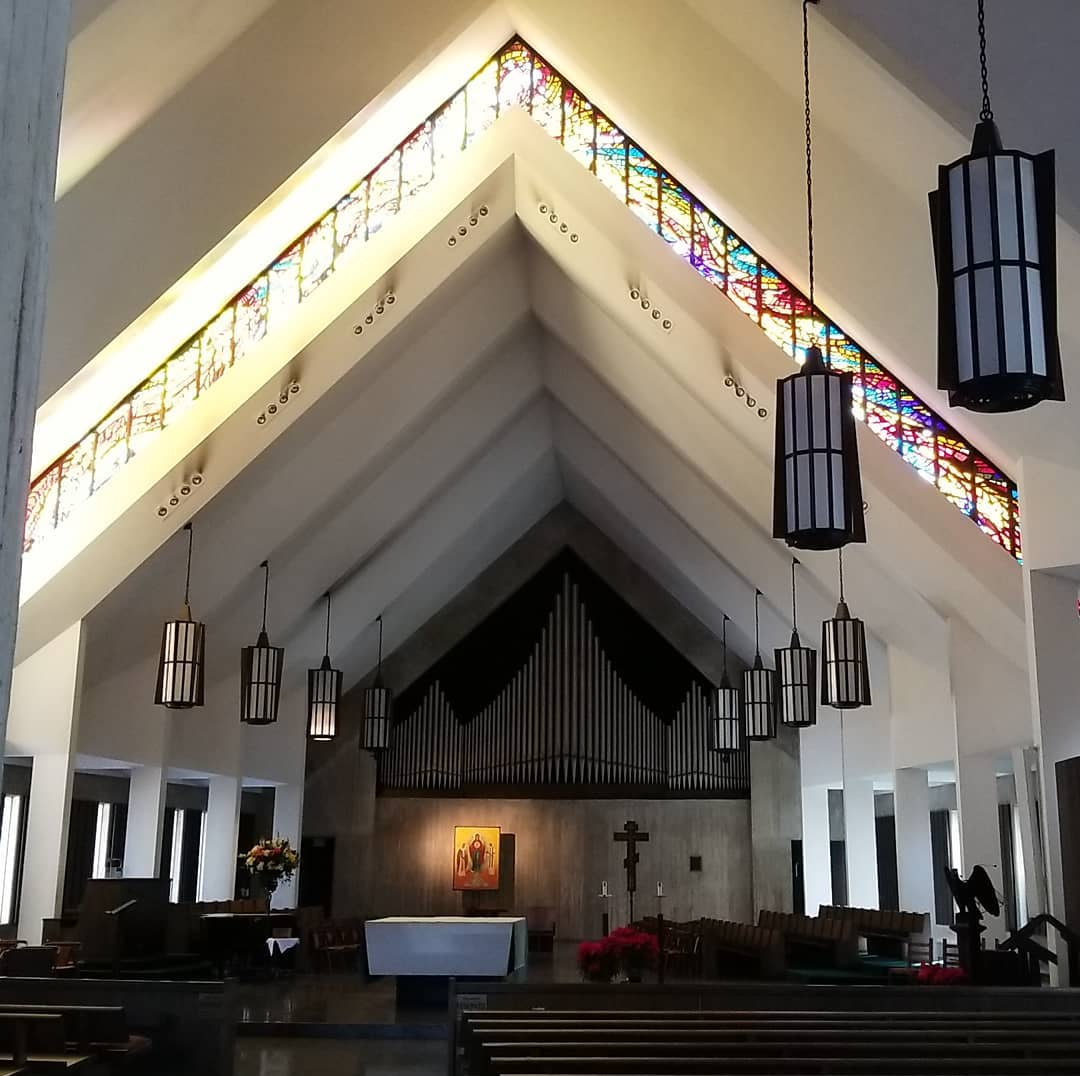

The abbey church's major organ was built by the Tellers Organ Company, a manufacturer of pipe organs in Erie, Pennsylvania, from 1906 to 1973. The organ was one of Teller's final projects. The instrument is of fine quality, but was never completed and the builder's design scheme was not realized.

==== Chapel organ ====
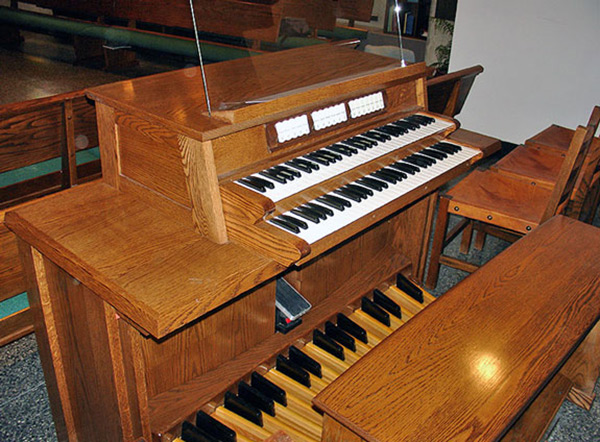

The second organ is in the side chapel where the Norbertines often say Mass. It was constructed by Patrick J. Murphy & Associates, an organ builder located in Stowe, Pennsylvania.

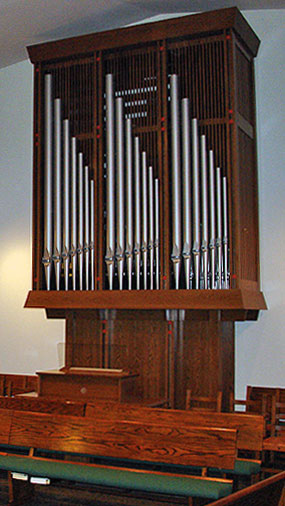
Side chapel organ case

== Leadership ==
Daylesford Abbey is currently headed by Abbot Domenic Rossi, O. Praem. Abbot Domenic is Daylesford's fifth Abbot. His immediate predecessor was Abbot Richard Antonucci, O. Praem.

Like many members of the community, Abbot Domenic hails from South Philadelphia. He was educated by the Norbertines at Bishop Neumann High School (now Saints John Neumann and Maria Goretti High School Home.) Abbot Domenic joined the community in 1966 and was ordained in 1974. He was elected to the position of Abbot in January 2018.

== Ministries ==
The Norbertines at Daylesford Abbey are active in many ministries throughout the Philadelphia region and the Delaware Valley. The priests of the Abbey serve in Pennsylvania, Delaware and Chicago. Norbertines serve at St. Norbert Parish St Norbert Parish, in Paoli, Pennsylvania.

Abbot Domenic Rossi, O. Praem., founded Bethesda Project Services for Philadelphians Experiencing Homelessness, a ministry to the homeless of Philadelphia. The Norbertine community at Daylesford Abbey continues to be actively engaged in this ministry today. Norbertines from Daylesford Abbey work in education as well, serving at Archmere Academy.

=== Spirituality and retreat center ===
The Spirituality Center at Daylesford Abbey offers programs such as private and group retreats, and seminars.
