= Portland Cable Tram =

Heritage tramway in Victoria, Australia

Coordinates: 38°21′18″S 141°36′24″E

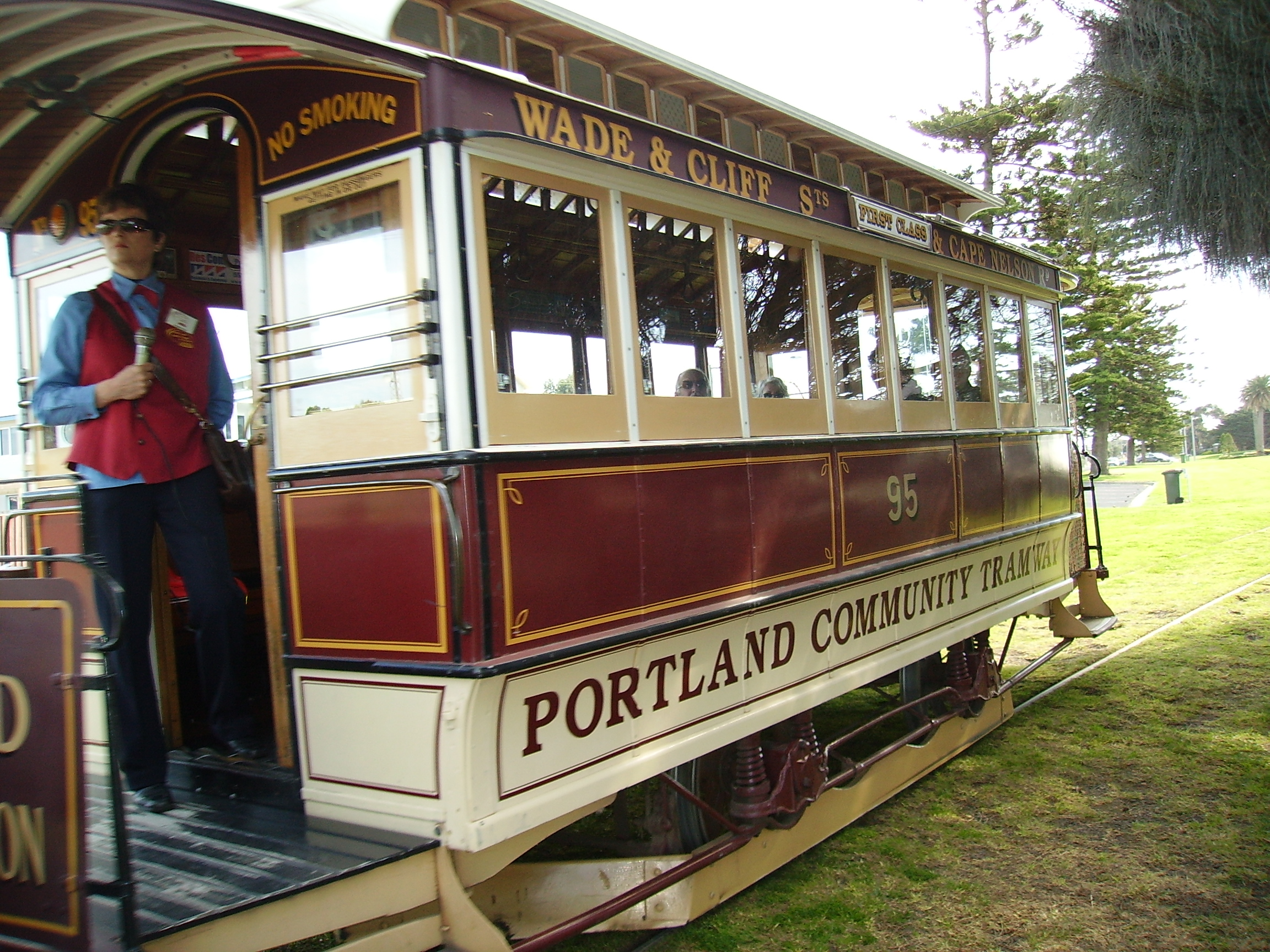
Restored former Melbourne tramcar - Saloon Car No. 95 - running on the Portland tramway

The Portland Cable Tram is heritage tramway in Portland, Victoria, Australia. It opened on 2 March 2002. Although the rolling stock in use are replicas or restored models of cable trams, they now run with diesel motors.

== History ==
In 1996, the Portland Cable Tram project was established with the aim of creating a tramway in the town. The basis of the proposal was that although Portland was in a region with natural tourist attractions, it lacked a significant man-made feature which would encourage tourists to stay longer in the area.

The funding of such a large project initially presented a problem, as tracks would have to be laid, rolling stock acquired, and a storage shed built. However, a donation of $220,000 by the Handbury family helped the proposal gain momentum. This was followed by $500,000 from the federal government, $775,000 from the Victorian Government and $175,000 from the Shire of Glenelg. A further $500,000 from other sources brought the total to $2.17 million.

The first year of operation proved successful, with 14,000 passengers carried. Since opening, more than 135,000 people have ridden the Portland Cable Tram.

== Current operation ==
The Portland Cable Tram is run by a group of around 60 volunteers who undertake roles as tram drivers, conductors, administrators, maintenance workers, cleaners, gardeners, and museum display curators. The tramway's general manager is the only paid employee.

The trams usually run five times a day, but only four services operate daily during winter. The route operates 364 days a year; there are no services on Christmas Day nor in the morning on Anzac Day and Good Friday.

Tickets, which provide one day's unlimited use of the trams, are available from the Museum and Depot, online, or the tram's conductor. Annual tickets are also available. Passengers may board and alight the trams at any of the six stations.

The Portland Cable Tram Museum and Depot is home to an 1880 horse-drawn carriage owned by Edward Henty, the first permanent European settler in the Port Phillip District (later Victoria), as well as model railway exhibits, classic cars and the largest private gemstone collection in the southern hemisphere. The gift shop sells memorabilia and refreshments are also available.

== Line guide ==
The line is 3.7 kilometres long and journeys depart from and return to the Portland Cable Tram Museum and Depot.

Beginning at the Museum and Depot, the tram heads in a westerly direction, stopping at the Powerhouse Museum, a small institution showcasing motor vehicles. A balloon loop then sends the tram back towards the Museum and Depot station after some street running. Passing through Henty Park, the next stop is the Botanic Gardens after which the line turns north and runs close to the Portland harbour along the Foreshore. A stop at the Portland Maritime Discovery Centre is followed by a climb up the headland to the Portland Bay Holiday Park, where another station is located. After passing several homes, the line turns east to terminate at the World War II Memorial Lookout, which also served as a water tower. At this point, the tram sets are turned on a triangle for the return trip back to the Portland Cable Tram Museum and Depot, making the ride 7.4 kilometres and around one hour in length.

== Rolling stock ==
There is a variety of rolling stock currently in use on the tramway.

The two grip cars operated by Portland Cable Trams are copies of Melbourne cable trams which ran from 1885 to 1940, constructed to the specifications of that period. They were built from scratch under the auspices of Keith McMillan, and are exact replicas, apart from the diesel engines that they use in place of the cable system. That method of propulsion was chosen because it would be virtually impossible to build the complicated underground cable network which originally pulled cable trams along.

The two saloon cars in service at Portland did run on the Melbourne system during its heyday. After the electrification of the network, the outdated cable tram cars were sold off. Saloon Car No. 95 initially entered service in November 1886 and was used on the Victoria Street route, running via Collins Street. The Portland Cable Tram organisation salvaged that car from Newton Williams in Swan Hill and restored it to service in February 2002.

Saloon Car No. 171 was originally built in 1886 and used on the Clifton Hill line until 1928, when it was sold and transported to Mount Macedon. The car was bought by Daryl and Julie Hawksworth in 1974, and in 1980, it was transported to the town of Blampied, Victoria, for restoration. No. 171 is on permanent loan to Portland Cable Trams from the Hawksworths, who had restored it to commemorate the 100th anniversary of cable trams commencing operation in Melbourne. Since its repair in 1985, the saloon car has operated at Lake Goldsmith, Bendigo, Melbourne and Kilmore in Victoria, as well as Wollongong and Loftus in New South Wales.
