= Daylesford, Pennsylvania =

Unincorporated community in Pennsylvania, US

- Unincorporated community
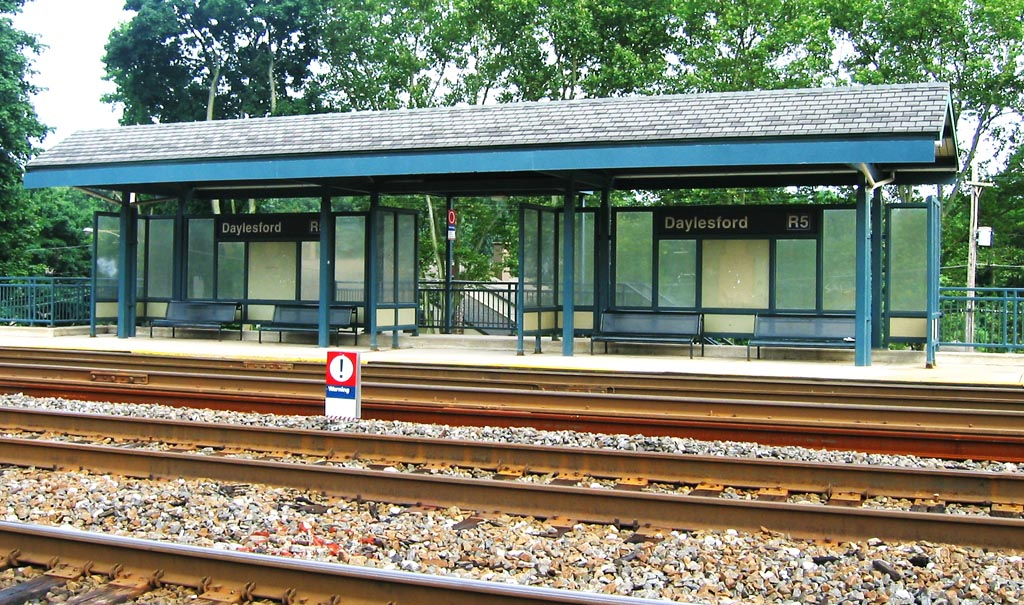
- Daylesford station

- Location within the U.S. state of Pennsylvania Daylesford (the United States)
- Coordinates: 40°02′20″N 75°27′37″W
- Country: United States
- State: Pennsylvania
- County: Chester
- Township: Tredyffrin
- Time zone: UTC-5 (Eastern (EST))
  - Summer (DST): UTC-4 (EDT)

Daylesford is an unincorporated community in Tredyffrin Township, Chester County, Pennsylvania, United States, in the southeastern part of the state, near Philadelphia. Located near the end of the Main Line, it is served by its own stop on the SEPTA Paoli/Thorndale Line.

In 1954, the Norbertines, a Roman Catholic religious order of canons regular, opened a novitiate at the former Cassatt Estate in Daylesford. In 1963, the Norbertine community moved to neighboring Willistown Township, near the community of Paoli, and established Daylesford Abbey.
