= Bullarto =

- Town
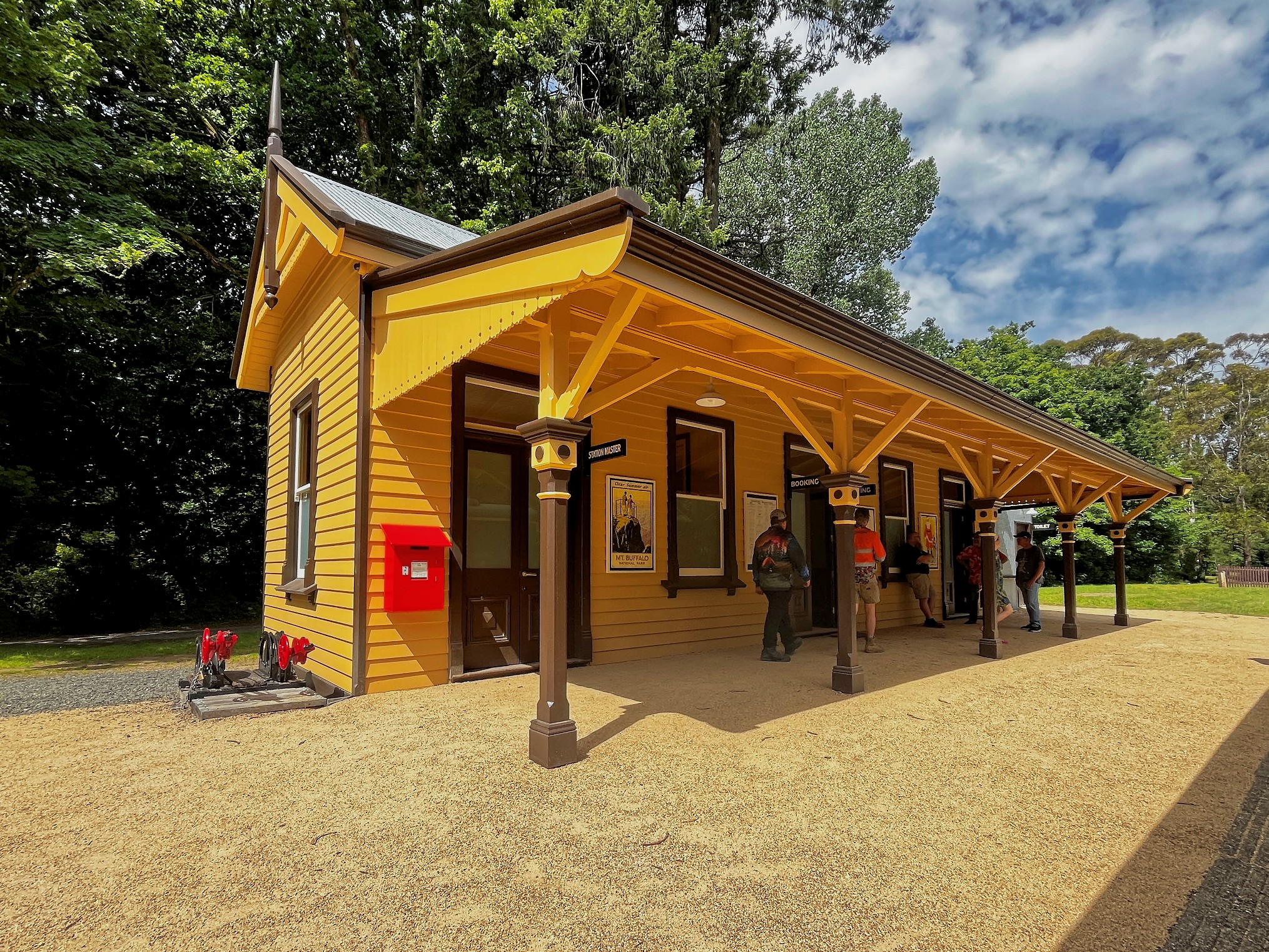
- Bullarto train station

- Coordinates: 37°24′0″S 144°14′0″E
- Country: Australia
- State: Victoria
- LGA: Shire of Hepburn

Government
  - State electorate: Macedon
  - Federal division: Ballarat
- Elevation: 750 m (2,460 ft)

Population
  - Total: 73 (2016 census)
- Postcode: 3461

Bullarto is an Australian town located in the Shire of Hepburn, Victoria. At the 2016 census, Bullarto had a population of 73.

Bullarto is 7 km south east of Daylesford on the Trentham road and is a potato growing district. The Bullarto railway station is the current terminus of the Daylesford Spa Country Railway rail motor tourist services. A post office opened there in 1874 and used barred numeral number 855 cancel (rated RRRR - 4 to 12 examples considered to exist). Another post office was opened at the railway station from 1884 using numeral 1392.

Bullarto has a community facility in the form of the Bullarto Hall. This is a popular location for weddings and community events. It is operated by a group of local volunteers.

The Bullarto community holds an annual tractor pull event in March. This event utilises the Bullarto Hall, the railway station and surrounding areas.

The Bullarto Football Club (Australian rules football) won the 1914 and 1915 Daylesford District Football Association premierships.

Historic families

There are several families who have lived in the Bullarto area for several generations. They are as follows:

- Orr - after whom Orrs Road was named.
- Trilogy - relative newcomers to the community, residing in the western area of Bullarto
- Mossop - after whom Mossops Road was named, living at the end of its original length
- Brown - now predominantly residing in Mossops Road and cultivating the land for many generations
