= List of heritage railways in Australia =

This is a list of heritage railways in Australia, some of which can also be considered tourist railways. Heritage tramways have also been included. Most are members of the Association of Tourist & Heritage Rail Australia (ATHRA). In addition to active operations, abandoned and putative operations are also included, but static museum sites and rolling stock operators without a 'dedicated' line do not fall within Wikipedia's definition of heritage railways. Miniature railways with gauges of less than 380mm (15 in) are excluded. Lines named in red are lacking a detailed Wikipedia entry.

The world's second preserved railway, and the first outside the United Kingdom, was Australia's Puffing Billy Railway. This railway operates on 24 kilometres (15 mi) of track, with much of its original rolling stock built as early as 1898.

== New South Wales ==
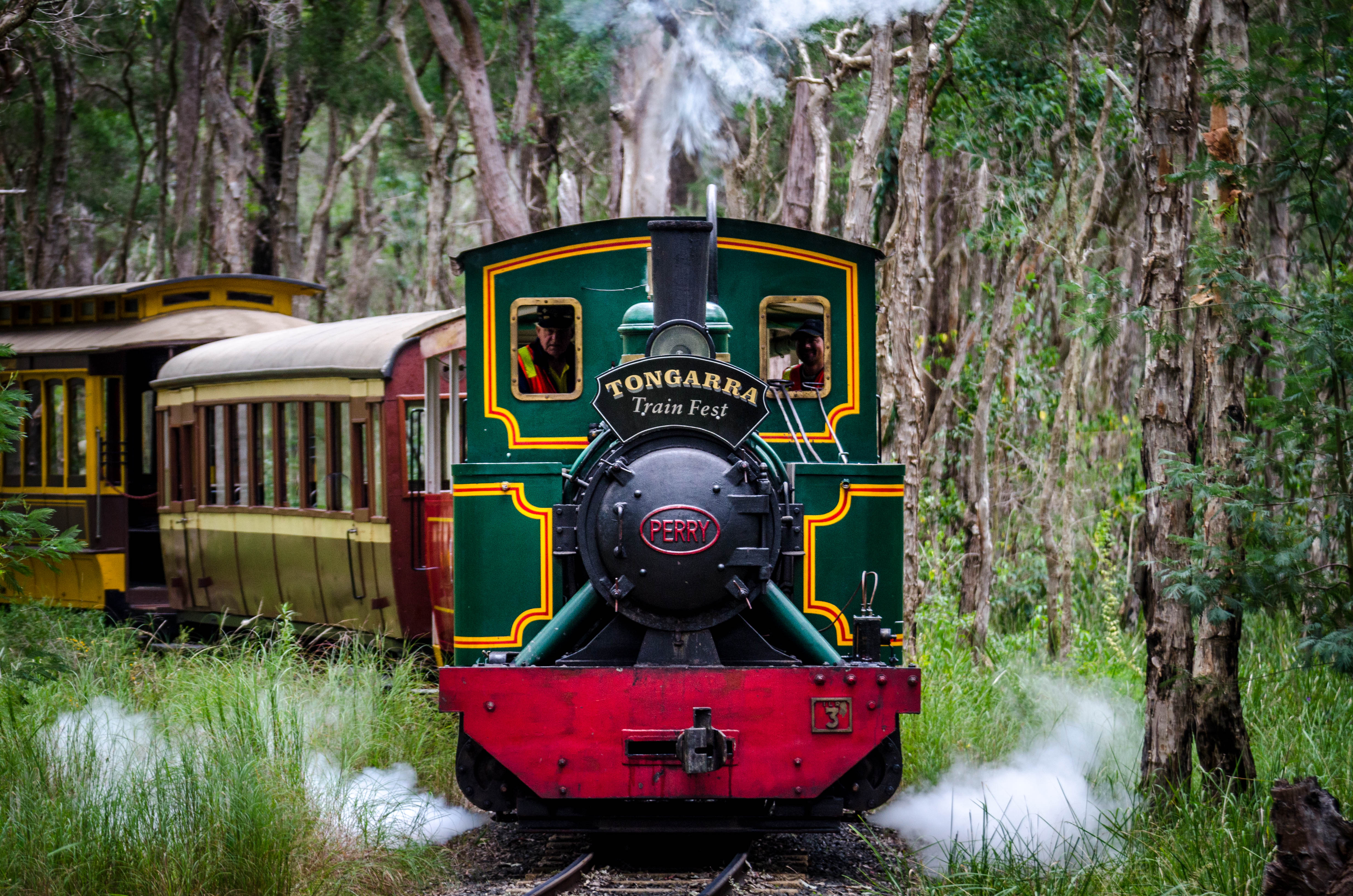
Tully Sugar Mill No.6 at Illawarra Light Railway Museum

1,435 mm (4 ft 8 1/2 in) gauge unless otherwise stated. See also Transport Heritage NSW

- Byron Bay Train
- Campbelltown Narrow Gauge Railway—610 mm (2 ft) gauge
- Cooma Monaro Railway (restoration work resumed in May 2024, in preparation for resumption of passenger service at a future date)
- Crookwell Heritage Railway (railway not yet operational)
- Dorrigo Steam Railway and Museum (railway not yet operational)
- Glenreagh Mountain Railway (railway not yet operational)
- Illawarra Light Railway Museum—610 mm (2 ft) gauge
- Kandos-Rylstone Heritage Railway
- Katoomba Scenic Railway—1,275mm (4 ft 2in) gauge (steepest railway in Australia—strictly, an inclined lift rather than a funicular)
- Lachlan Valley Railway—Cowra (static museum at Cowra but with aspirations to restore the Blayney - Cowra line)
- Ladysmith Tourist Railway (rail bike rides within static museum site)
- Lake Macquarie Light Rail—Toronto—610 mm (2 ft) gauge (privately owned—not open to public)
- Lithgow State Mine Railway (railway not yet operational)
- Michelago Tourist Railway (railway operation ceased from 2006)
- Newington Armory Railway–Olympic Park—610 mm (2 ft) gauge (railway operation ceased from 2020)
- NSW Rail Museum—Thirlmere
- Oberon Tarana Heritage Railway (railway not yet operational)
- Sulphide Street railway museum—1,067 mm (3 ft 6 in) gauge
- Richmond Vale Railway Museum (railway operation suspended from 24 February 2024)
- Sydney Tramway Museum
- Timbertown Heritage Railway, Wauchope—595mm (2 ft) gauge
- Valley Heights Rail Museum
- Zig Zag Railway—1,067 mm (3 ft 6 in) gauge

== Northern Territory ==
1,067 mm (3 ft 6 in) gauge

- Adelaide River and Snake Creek Railway, Adelaide River (project abandoned)
- Ghan Preservation Society ("The Old Ghan"), Alice Springs (railway operation ceased from 2001)

== Queensland ==
1,067 mm (3 ft 6 in) gauge unless otherwise stated.

- Archer Park Rail Museum, Rockhampton
- Atherton—Herberton Historic Railway
- Australian Sugar Cane Railway, Bundaberg—610 mm (2 ft) gauge.
- Bally Hooley Steam Railway, Port Douglas—610 mm (2 ft) gauge.
- Beaudesert Rail (railway operation ceased from 2003)
- Big Pineapple Railway, Woombye—610 mm (2 ft) gauge. (railway operation suspended as at December 2022)
- Brisbane Tramway Museum, Ferny Grove—1,435 mm (4 ft 8 1/2 in) gauge. (ride within static museum site)
- Burrum Mining Museum, Howard—610 mm (2 ft) gauge. (ride within static museum site)
- Downs Explorer, Warwick (run excursions over freight-only sections of state system, from Warwick to Stanthorpe, Wallangarra, Clifton, Wheatvale, Hendon, Toowoomba, Goondiwindi)
- DownsSteam Tourist Railway & Museum, Drayton, Toowoomba (Operational from May 2024 on QR track to Brookstead and Hendon with steam-hauled ex Brisbane suburban cars and a railmotor)
- Dreamworld Railway, Coomera—610 mm (2 ft) gauge. (little more than a funfair railway)
- Ginger Train, Yandina—610 mm (2 ft) gauge.
- Gulflander : Croydon–Normanton.
- Kuranda Scenic Railway : Cairns–Kuranda.
- Mary Valley Rattler (previously known as Mary Valley Heritage Railway and The Valley Rattler)
- Mary Ann Steam Train, Maryborough
- Queensland Pioneer Steam Railway (also known as Swanbank Railway)
- Ravenshoe Railway Company (railway operation suspended from December 2020 - plans for reopening in progress)
- Rosewood Railway (railway operation suspended as at December 2022)
- Savannahlander—Cairns–Forsayth.
- Sea World Railway, Main Beach—610 mm (2 ft) gauge. (railway operation ceased by 2022; not to be confused with monorail which also ceased from 2022)
- Southern Downs Steam Railway—former name of Downs Explorer, q.v. above
- Swanbank Railway—see Queensland Pioneer Steam Railway (above)
- Woodford Railway, Woodford—610 mm (2 ft) gauge. (previously known as Durundur Railway)

== South Australia ==
1,600 mm (5 ft 3 in) unless otherwise noted

- Cobdogla Irrigation and Steam Museum Railway—610 mm (2 ft) gauge. (railway operation suspended from December 2022)
- Moonta Mines Tourist Railway—610 mm (2 ft) gauge.
- National Railway Museum, Port Adelaide—457mm (1 ft 6 in) gauge (although the static museum features all gauges, the tourist railway is 457mm gauge)
- Pichi Richi Railway—1,067 mm (3 ft 6 in) gauge.
- Semaphore to Fort Glanville Tourist Railway—457mm (1 ft 6 in) gauge. (associated with National Railway Museum, see above)
- South Australian Light Railway Centre, Port Milang—610 mm (2 ft) gauge.
- SteamRanger Heritage Railway
- Tramway Museum, St Kilda—1,435 mm (4 ft 8 1/2 in) gauge.
- Victor Harbor Horse Drawn Tram

== Tasmania ==
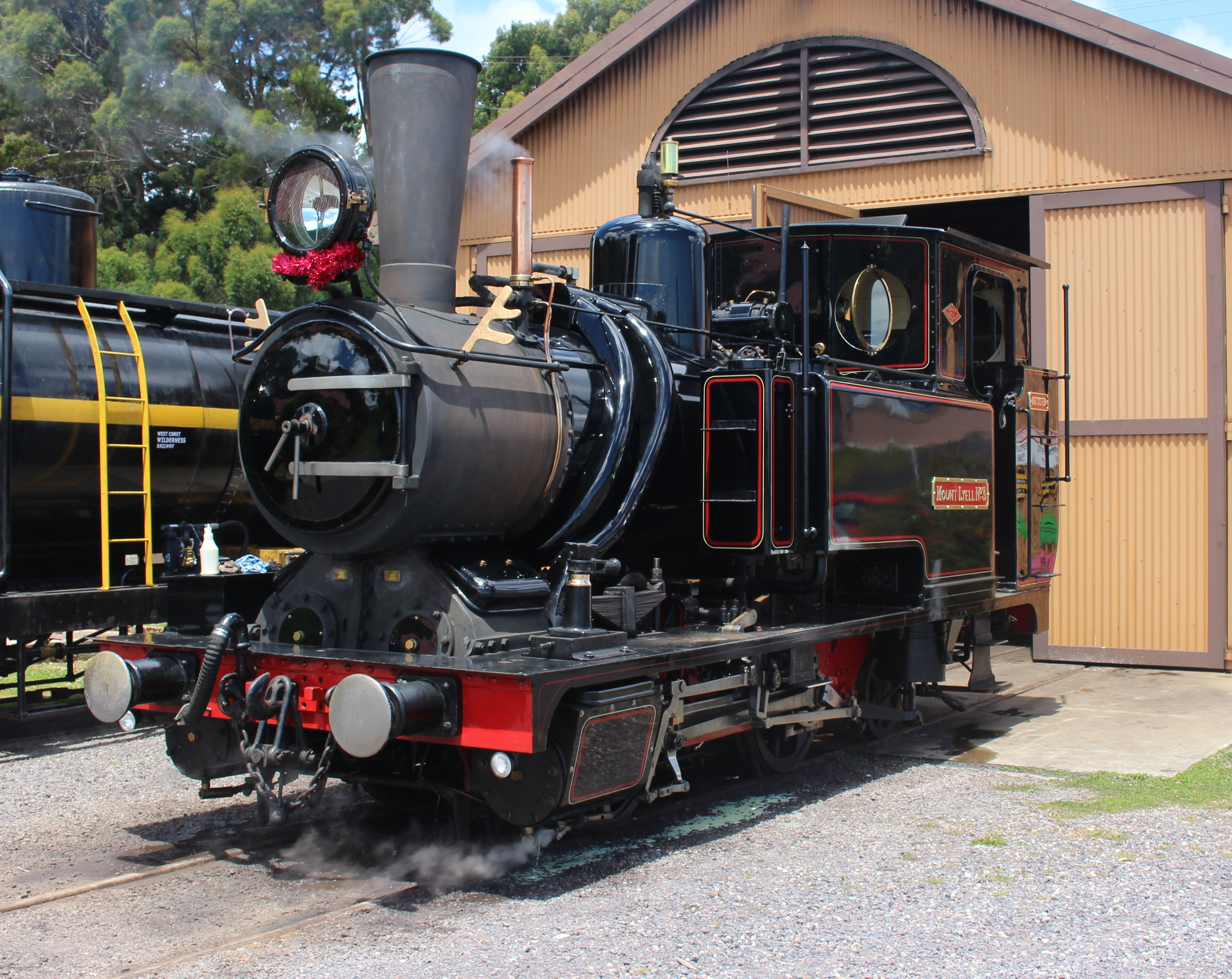
Mount Lyell No. 3 of West Coast Wilderness Railway at Strahan Station

1,067 mm (3 ft 6 in) gauge unless otherwise stated.

- Bush Mill Railway—381 mm (15 in) gauge. (railway operation ceased from 2004)
- Derwent Valley Railway (railway operation ceased from 2005, not yet restored to operation)
- Don River Railway
- Ida Bay Railway, Lune River (railway operation suspended from 2018, not yet operational again)
- Launceston & North East Railway (railway not yet operational)
- Launceston Tramway Museum
- Railtrack Riders, Maydena (rail bikes on National Park—Florentine line)
- Redwater Creek Railway—381 mm (15 in) gauge. (formerly Redwater Creek Heritage Museum)
- Tasmanian Transport Museum, Glenorchy (operating ca. 2 km round trip from 23 May 2023, with plans to extend length - see https://pulsetasmania.com.au/news/heritage-trains-to-soon-roll-through-hobarts-northern-suburbs-as-crew-training-begins/)
- Wee Georgie Wood Steam Railway, Tullah—610 mm (2 ft) gauge.
- West Coast Wilderness Railway

== Victoria ==
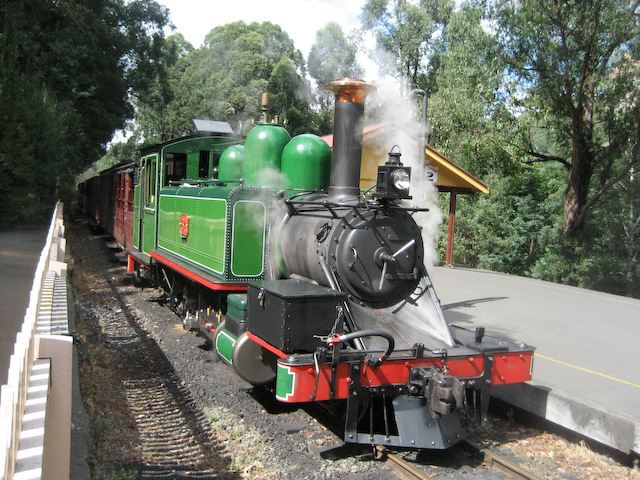
Puffing Billy train at Lakeside station

1,600 mm (5 ft 3 in) unless otherwise noted

- Alexandra Timber Tramway—610 mm (2 ft) gauge.
- Ballarat Tramway Museum—1,435 mm (4 ft 8 1/2 in) gauge.
- Bendigo Tramways—1,435 mm (4 ft 8 1/2 in) gauge.
- Bellarine Railway—1,067 mm (3 ft 6 in) gauge.
- Coal Creek Bush Tramway—610 mm (2 ft) gauge. (railway operation ceased)
- Daylesford Spa Country Railway
- Kerrisdale Mountain Railway & Museum—610 mm (2 ft) gauge.
- Melbourne Tramcar Preservation, Haddon (tramway operation ceased)
- Mornington Railway
- Portland Cable Tram—1,435 mm (4 ft 8 1/2 in) gauge.
- Puffing Billy Railway—762 mm (2 ft 6 in) gauge.
- Red Cliffs Historical Steam Railway—610 mm (2 ft) gauge.
- Steamrail Victoria—Newport
- South Gippsland Railway (railway operation ceased from January 2016)
- Tramway Heritage Centre, Byland (tramway operation ceased 2009)
- The Stringybark Express (railway operation ceased from 2002—now a rail trail)
- Victorian Goldfields Railway
- Walhalla Goldfields Railway—762 mm (2 ft 6 in) gauge.
- Yarra Valley Railway (operation between Yarrawarra tunnel and Yarra Glen suspended pending restoration of 2009 fire damaged trestles and track)

== Western Australia ==
1,067 mm (3 ft 6 in) gauge unless otherwise stated.

- Bennett Brook Railway—610 mm (2 ft) gauge.
- Carnarvon Jetty Tramway (tramway operation ceased by 2007 - future plans not clear)
- Golden Mile Loop Line Railway, Boulder, Kalgoorlie (rail operation ceased from 2004, assets disposed in 2024)
- Hotham Valley Railway (incorporating Steam Ranger, Dwellingup Forest Train and Etmilyn Restaurant Train)
- Kojonup Tourist Railway (railway operation suspended from 2018)
- Pemberton Tramway Company
- Perth Electric Tramway Society, Whiteman Park, Perth — 1,435 mm (4 ft 8 1/2 in) gauge.
- Oliver Hill Railway, Rottnest Island
- Wheatbelt Heritage Rail, Dowerin (railway not yet operational)

== See also ==
- List of heritage railways
- Western Australian Rail Transport Museum
- Newport Railway Museum
- Workshops Rail Museum
