= Musk, Victoria =

Musk Victoria
- Coordinates: 37°22′0″S 144°12′0″E
- Population: 150 (2016 census)
- Postcode(s): 3461
- Location: 109 km (68 mi) NW of Melbourne; 50 km (31 mi) NE of Ballarat; 7 km (4 mi) SE of Daylesford
- LGA(s): Shire of Hepburn
- State electorate(s): Macedon
- Federal division(s): Ballarat

Musk is a locality in central Victoria, Australia in the Hepburn Shire local government area, 109 kilometres (68 mi) north-west of the state capital, Melbourne. At the 2016 census, Musk and the surrounding area had a population of 150.

Musk Creek Post Office opened around March 1879, was renamed Musk in 1937 and closed in 1974.

== See also ==
- Musk railway station
