= Daylesford Spa Country Railway =

Tourist railway located in Victoria, Australia

Coordinates: 37°20′30″S 144°09′15″E

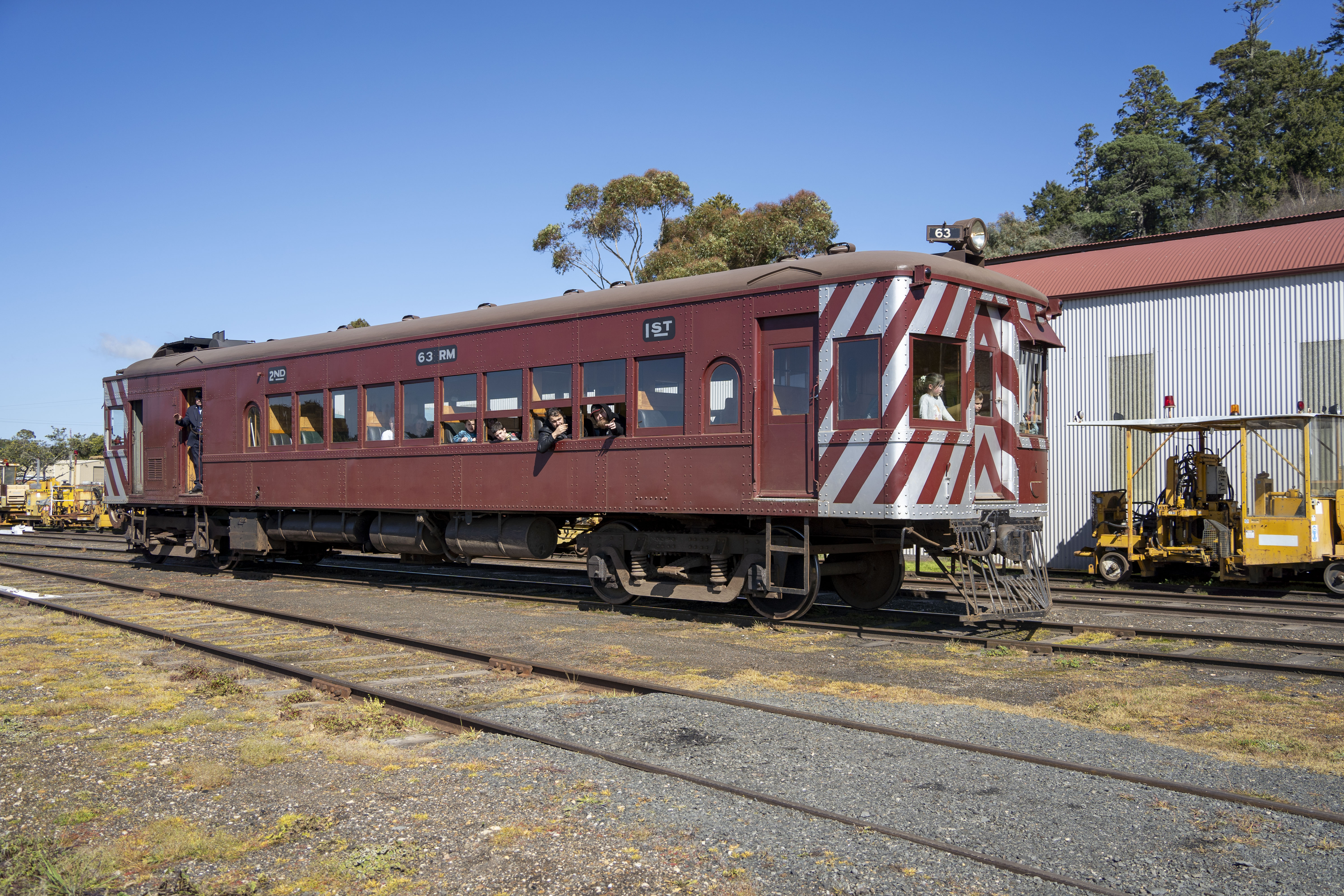
- DERM 63RM arriving at Daylesford station, August 2024

Overview
- Stations: Daylesford, Musk, Passing Clouds, Bullarto
- Website: dscr.com.au

Service
- Type: Tourist Railway

History
- Opened: 1880
- Closed: 1978
- Reopened: 1990

The Daylesford Spa Country Railway (which is operated by the Central Highlands Tourist Railway) is a volunteer-operated 1,600 mm (5 ft 3 in) gauge tourist railway located in Victoria, Australia. It operates on a section of the closed and dismantled Daylesford line, and currently runs services between Daylesford and the hamlet of Bullarto.

== History ==
=== Victorian Railways era ===
The original line was opened in two stages, from the mainline junction at Carlsruhe to the town of Trentham, on 16 February 1880. The remainder of the line, from Trentham to Daylesford, was opened a month later on 17 March. The line initially had significant goods and passenger traffic, with 50,000 passengers travelling the line in 1884 alone. However, over the next seventy years, both traffic and the quality of line gradually degraded, until the last passenger service was replaced with a road coach in 1978.

=== Reopening as a tourist railway ===
The Central Highlands Tourist Railway was founded two years later, and set about restoring the railway to operating condition. After several years of restoration, trolley services commenced from Daylesford station to a temporary terminus located in the Wombat State Forest, a distance of 3.2 km (2.0 mi), in the latter half of the 1980s. On 15 September 1990 rail services commenced between Daylesford and the nearby hamlet of Musk, a distance of 5.4 km (3.4 mi). Another 3.8 km of line was opened on 17 March 1997, allowing services to operate as far as Bullarto, 9.2 km (5.7 mi) from Daylesford. As Bullarto station had been demolished, this required building a new platform and installing a portable station building.

In 2002, the organisation changed its trading name from the Central Highlands Tourist Railway to the Daylesford Spa Country Railway.

On the evening of 23 February 2009, bushfires in the Daylesford region destroyed 1.6 kilometres (1 mi) of track running through the Wombat State Forest, with about 2000 sleepers destroyed, rails buckled, and the last two broad-gauge cattle pits on a running railway in Victoria destroyed. As a result, services were truncated, running out of Daylesford on the 1.7 km (1.1 mi) of line which remained unaffected. The repairs were expected to cost $250,000.

In August 2010, services over the first 5.4 km (3.4 mi) from Daylesford to Musk were reinstated after repairs to the damaged section through the forest, and the rest of the line through to Bullarto was reopened in December 2013.

== Rolling stock ==
=== DSCR Locomotives & Railmotors ===
Number	Image	Year built	Builder	Status	Notes
RM 7		22 July 1949		Under Restoration	102 hp Walker railmotor. Stored for future restoration.
RM 32		24 March 1953		Operational	153 hp Walker railmotor.
RM 53		15 February 1926		Under Restoration	A double ended Leyland railmotor
RM 62		21 July 1930		Stored	DERM, Stored for future restoration
RM 63		7 August 1930		Operational	DERM
RM 74		8 February 1937		Under Restoration	Passenger mail motor.
RM 82		11 October 1950		Stored	280 hp Walker railmotor. Spare parts for RM 91.
RM 85		15 May 1951		Stored	280 hp Walker railmotor. Stored for future restoration.
RM 91		30 May 1952		Operational	280 hp Walker railmotor.
DRC 40		18 May 1971		Operational	Diesel Rail Car.
Y 159		14 March 1968		Operational	Y Class Diesel Locomotive
RT 3		15 February 1957		Operational	Rail tractor

=== Trailers and Carriages ===
Number	Image	Year built	Builder	Status	Notes
26 MT		29 August 1930		Stored	DERM trailer. Stored for future restoration.
56 MT		5 February 1952		Stored	Walker railmotor trailer
200 MT		24 April 1928		Operational	Brill railmotor trailer
28 C		15 December 1891		Stored	C van
ZL 544	544 ZL coupled to Y159	26 February 1918		Operational	ZL van
BN 1		16 September 1981		Operational	N type carriage
BDN 6		2 October 1981		Operational	N type carriage
BRN 52		6 October 1983		Operational	N type carriage
ACN 54		6 October 1983		Operational	N type carriage

== Current operations and extension plans ==
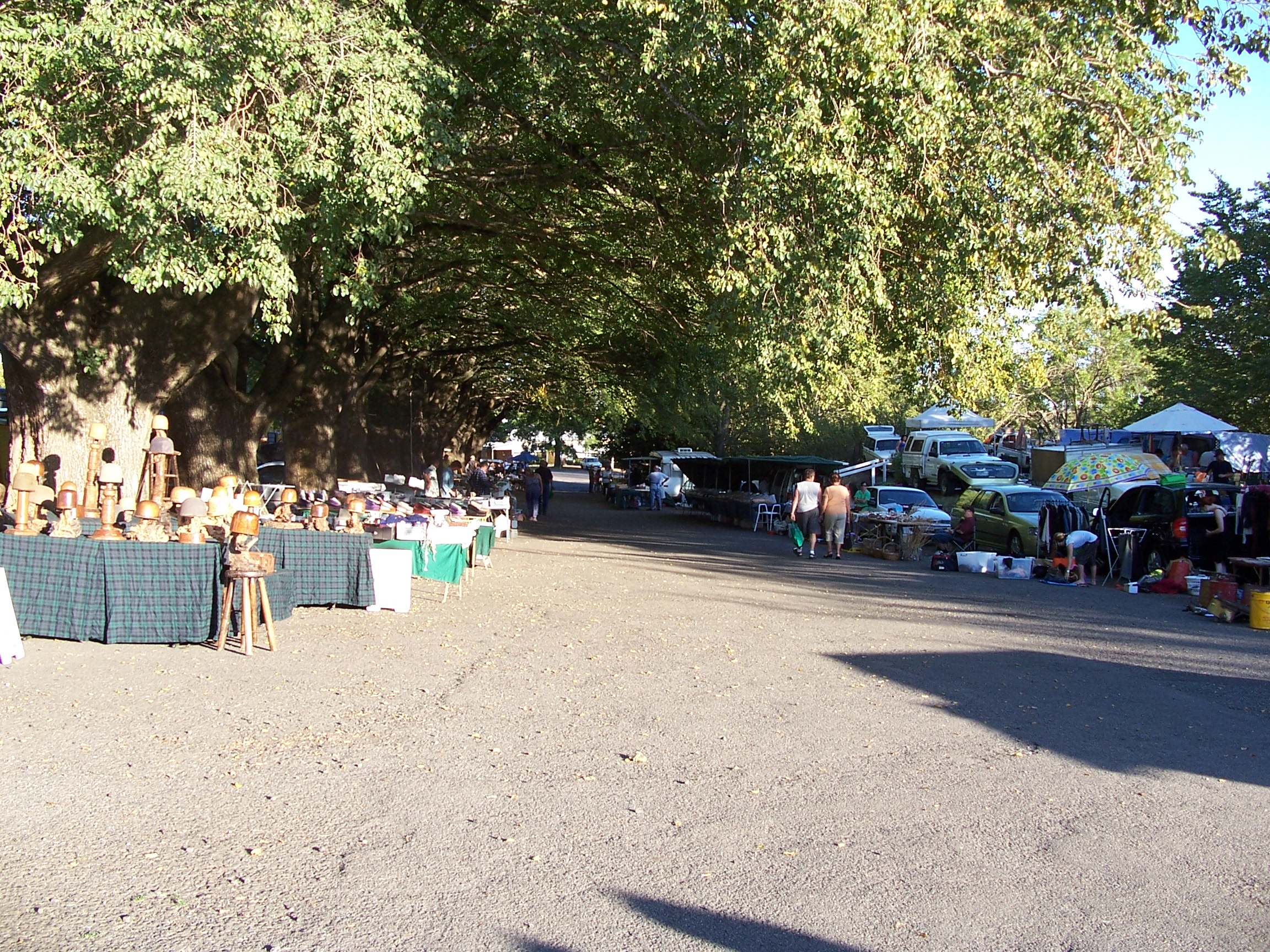
Sunday market adjacent to Daylesford station

The railway operates every Sunday, with five return services to Bullarto and one to Musk on its regular time table. In 2017, the railway commenced operations on Wednesdays during the school holidays with three return services to Bullarto. On the first Saturday evening of each month, the railway operates the Silver Streak Food and Wine Train., although these have been suspended since March 2020

The railway also runs the famous Daylesford Sunday Market within the station grounds, which has been an important part of the railway's activities since the early 1980s.

In 2018 a new platform opened adjacent to the Passing Clouds winery at Musk, opening up new opportunities for passengers to enjoy the hospitality of the winery and travel there by vintage train.

For many years, there have been plans to re-open the line from Bullarto to Trentham, which is 9.7 km (6.0 mi) from Bullarto and 18.9 km (11.7 mi) from Daylesford. While these plans were on the back burner for some time, this re-opening is now in planning and is considered a priority project by Hepburn Shire Council. The project will see the reopening of the disused Lyonville and Trentham stations, and the construction of a new station at Wombat Forest. However no date has been set for when the Bullarto-Trentham section will reopen.

== See also ==
- Tourist and Heritage Railways Act
