= Leyland railmotor =

1925 Railmotor by Victorian Railways, Australia

Victorian Railways Leyland Railmotor
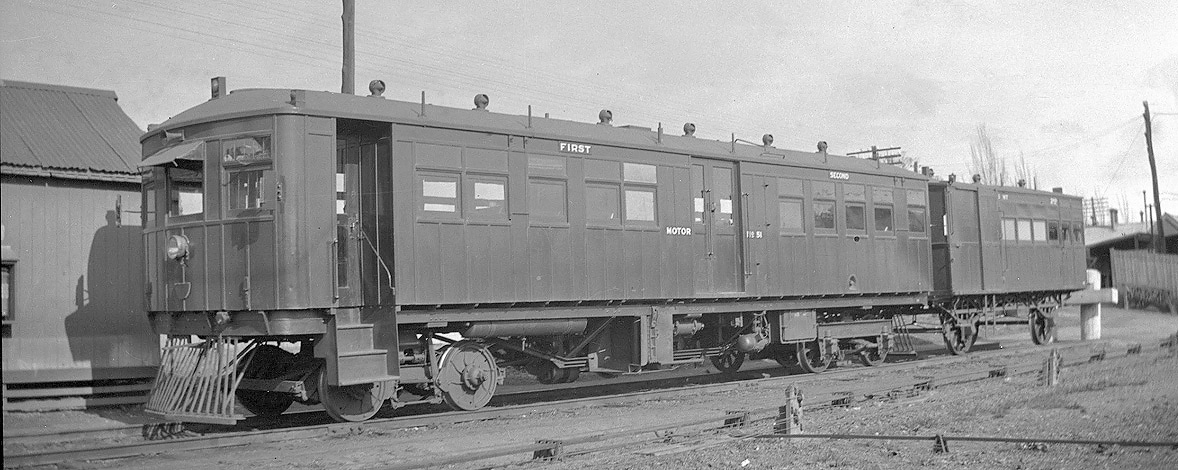
- Leyland railmotor number 51
- Manufacturers: Leyland (Engine); Victorian Railways (Body and frame)
- Designer: Victorian Railways
- Assembly: Victorian Railways
- Order no.: 4
- Built at: Newport Workshops
- Constructed: 1925-1926
- Entered service: 1925-1954
- Number built: 4
- Number in service: 0
- Number preserved: 1
- Number scrapped: 3
- Design code: RM
- Fleet numbers: 51-54
- Capacity: 27 1st class and 29 2nd class passengers

Specifications
- Car body construction: 42 ft 6 in (12.95 m)
- Car length: 42 ft 6 in (12.95 m)
- Width: 9 ft 6 in (2.90 m)
- Height: 11 ft 11.375 in (3.64173 m)
- Wheelbase: 28 ft 0 in (8.53 m)
- Weight: 15.45 long tons (15.70 t)
- Prime mover: Petrol
- Engine type: Petrol engine
- Power output: 100 hp (75 kW)
- Track gauge: 5 ft 3 in (1,600 mm)

Tasmanian Government Railways LP Class
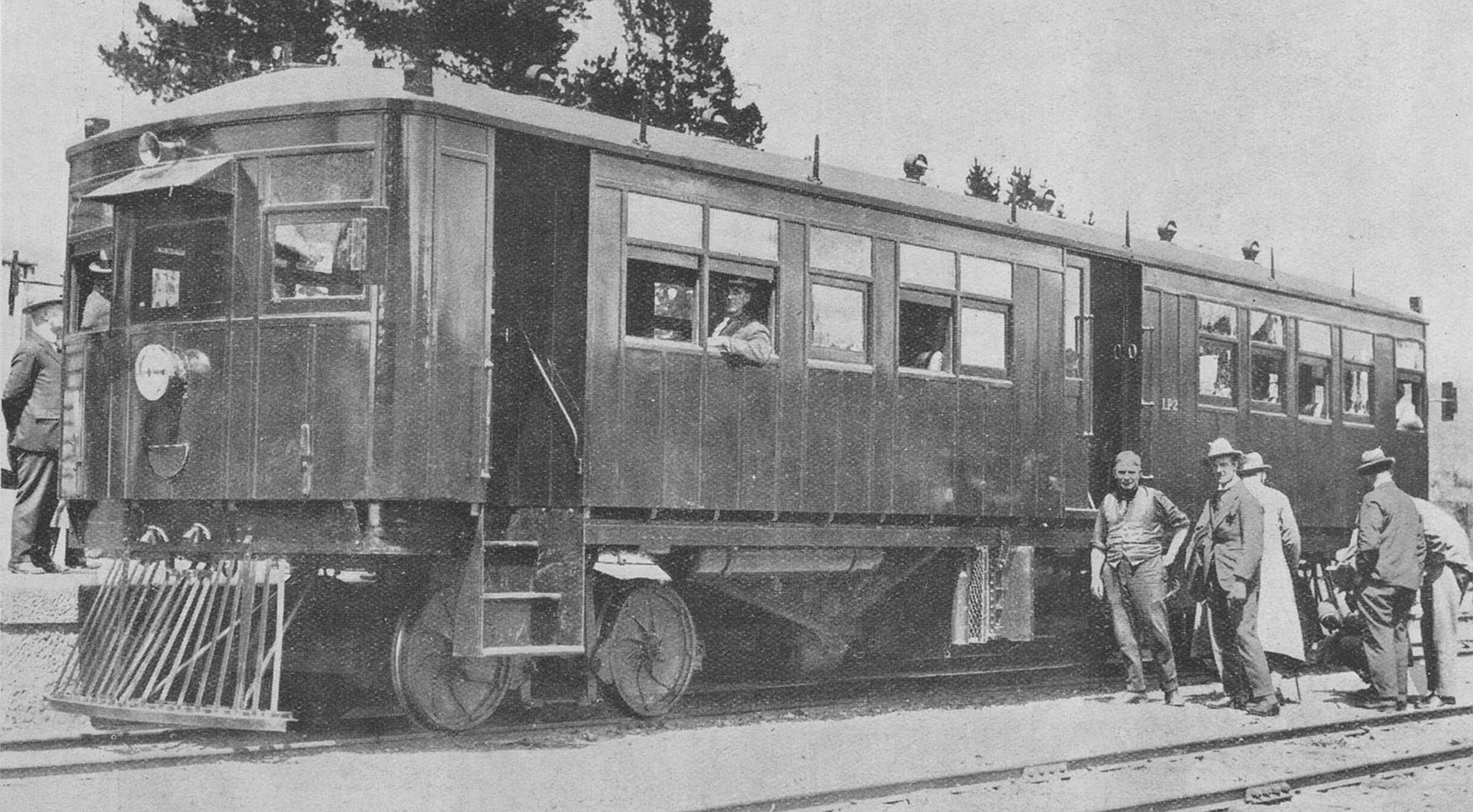
- TGR railmotor LP 2 at New Norfolk with dignitaries on 27 January 1926.
- Manufacturers: Newport Workshops (Body); Leyland Motors (Engine)
- Order no.: 2
- Built at: Newport Workshops
- Constructed: 1925–1926
- Entered service: 1926
- Number built: 2
- Number preserved: 1 (Body only)
- Design code: LP
- Fleet numbers: LP 1, LP 2

Specifications
- Car length: 42 ft 1 in (12.83 m)
- Engine type: Leyland 100 hp petrol
- Track gauge: 3 ft 6 in (1,067 mm)

The Leyland railmotor (also known at the Double-Ended Railmotor) was introduced by the Victorian Railways in 1925. After the success of the AEC railmotor, the Victorian Railways wanted a more powerful and comfortable vehicle for longer journeys.

== History ==
Four of the railmotors were built by the Victorian Railways for use in Victoria, mostly on the services to Echuca, Cohuna, Whittlesea and Tallangatta, with the occasional trip to Mansfield and Maffra. They were also used on some mainline services.

Following the introduction of the Leyland railmotors in Victoria, the Tasmanian Government Railways (TGR) ordered two similar units to reduce operating costs on their narrow-gauge branch lines. Built at the Newport Workshops in 1926, the units were designated the LP class and numbered LP 1 and LP 2. While sharing the same 100 hp Leyland petrol engine and wooden body design as the Victorian units, they were constructed for the 3 ft 6 in (1,067 mm) gauge and featured a slightly shorter 42-foot body. Despite their modern intent, they had a relatively short service life and were officially withdrawn in 1938.

The Leyland railmotors remained in service until the last two were withdrawn in July 1954, following the introduction of the Walker railmotors.

== Preservation ==
53RM is preserved at the Daylesford Spa Country Railway. It is planned to return it to service when time and funds permit. The vehicle had been taken off-register on 30 July 1954 in lieu of 52RM, which experienced a crack in the drive bogie at Picola. It had celebrated its 100th birthday on the 16th of February 2026.

The body of LP 2 is preserved at the Don River Railway in Devonport, Tasmania. Originally built by the Newport Workshops in 1926, it was officially withdrawn from service in 1938.
