= Walker railmotor =

Diesel railcar

Walker Railmotors
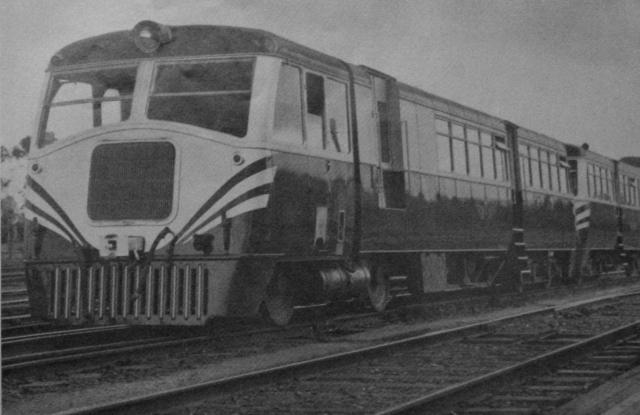
- 153hp Walker railmotor and trailer soon after delivery
- Stock type: Diesel railmotor
- In service: 1948-1981
- Manufacturers: Walker Brothers (power units); Martin & King (bodies); Thompsons (underframes)
- Designer: Walker Brothers
- Assembly: Victorian Railways
- Replaced: Steam locomotives and carriges AEC railmotors Leyland railmotors
- Constructed: 1948-1955 (102/153hp power units); 1948-1953 (102/153hp passenger units); 1950-1953 (280hp sets)
- Entered service: 15 March 1948 (102hp); 16 July 1948 (153hp); 6 June 1950 (280hp); 18 October 1948 (trailers)
- Scrapped: 1970-1981
- Number built: 102hp power units: 13; 153hp power units: 16; 102/153hp passenger units: 27; 280hp: 12 (+ 1 spare power unit); Trailers: 16
- Number preserved: 102hp: 1; 153hp: 3; 280hp: 3 Trailers: 3
- Fleet numbers: 1-13RM (102hp power units); 20-35RM (153hp power units); 100-101, 220-234 (102/153hp passenger units); 80-92RM (280hp units); 50-64MT (Trailers)
- Capacity: 102/153hp long Passenger Unit: 18 1st, 27nd, 1.25 LT (1 t) luggage 102/153hp short passenger unit: 18 1st, 22nd, 2 LT (2 t) luggage 280hp A+B passenger units: 38 1st class, 56 2nd class, 2x 1 LT (1,016 kg) luggage Trailer unit: 16 1st, 22 2nd class passengers, 2 LT (2 t) luggage
- Operator: Victorian Railways (trading as Vicrail from 1974)
- Line served: Various

Specifications
- Train length: 102hp: 12.6 m (41 ft 4 in); 153hp: 13.2 m (43 ft 4 in); 280hp: 37 m (121 ft 5 in)
- Car length: 102hp power unit: 2.6 m (8 ft 6 in); 153hp power unit: 3.2 m (10 ft 6 in); 102/153hp passenger units and trailers: 10 m (32 ft 10 in)
- Maximum speed: 1-13RM: 45 mph (72 km/h); 20-13RM: 50 mph (80 km/h); 280hp sets: 60 mph (97 km/h)
- Weight: 1-13RM: 18 t (18 long tons; 20 short tons); 20-35RM: 20 t (20 long tons; 22 short tons); 280hp (whole): 55 t (54 long tons; 61 short tons); Trailers: 17 t (17 long tons; 19 short tons)
- Prime movers: 1-13RM: Gardner 6LW; 20-35RM: Gardner 6L3; 80-92RM: 2x Gardner 8LW (140 hp (100 kW)
- Power output: 1-13RM: 102 hp (76 kW); 20-35RM: 153 hp (114 kW); 80-92RM: 280 hp (210 kW)
- Tractive effort: 1-13RM: 13.21 kN (2,970 lbf); 20-35RM: 18.4 kN (4,100 lbf); 80-92RM: 27.96 kN (6,290 lbf)
- Track gauge: 5 ft 3 in (1,600 mm)

Notes/references
- Fuel capacity: 102/153hp units: 40 imp gal (180 L); 280hp units: 2 x 50 imp gal (230 L)

The family of Walker railmotors were a type of diesel railcar operated by the Victorian Railways in Australia.

After World War II, the Victorian Railways undertook a major rebuilding program known as Operation Phoenix. One of the first tasks was the upgrading of passenger services on country branch lines, through the replacement of 23 wooden-bodied railmotors built in the 1920s, and the withdrawal of steam locomotive hauled mixed trains.

An initial order of twelve 102 hp (76 kW) railcars, six 153 hp (114 kW) railcars with trailers, and twelve 280 hp (210 kW) railcars was placed with Walker Brothers, Wigan, England. It was then extended to include a further nine 153 hp (110 kW) railmotors and trailers. The first was delivered in 1948, with additions to the fleet running through to 1955.

== Construction ==
The power units and controls were built by Walker Bros. and shipped out from Wigan England, the underframes were built by Thompsons of Castlemaine and the car bodies were built by Martin & King, in the Melbourne suburb of Armadale. Assembly took place at the Newport Workshops. The van bodies were constructed with composite wood and steel framework, and aluminium sheeting screwed to the frames.

The engine and trailing units were initially fitted with small plates below skirt level identifying each section as part of that specific railmotor set, i.e. 80RM, but these were removed as units were rotated through workshops and mixed with each other. Within a few years the identity of the 102 hp (76 kW) and 153 hp (114 kW) motors was marked only on the cabside door (with nothing on the saloon unit), and on the 280 hp (209 kW) railmotors only on one side of each motor unit with nothing on either saloon unit. Vehicle identities were occasionally further confused when cabside doors were swapped in later years.

The intended life of the Walker railmotors was only 10 years. However, most remained in service for up to 30 years. In 1981 the Central Highlands Tourist Railway (now the Daylesford Spa Country Railway) acquired 91RM, 32RM and 56MT with the transfer being carried out in March 1982. Restoration of 91RM began in January 1987, and it was certified for traffic in March 1990.

== Description ==
Each passenger unit was equipped with adjustable seating, internal heating, non-draught windows, water tanks for drinking or washing, along with ample luggage storage in overhead wire racks. The Walkers were the first railmotors in the Victorian Railways' fleet to provide hot water, this being heated by the engine-cooling system. At least when new, the engines did not cause any vibration in the passenger compartments. The lighting system was powered by the then-standard Victorian Railways' 24vDC supply, which utilised a belt-driven axle generator to charge batteries and 20-watt globes. Trailer cars were not fitted with their own power supply, instead drawing power via jumper cables from adjacent units; the exceptions being 54 and 56MT, which are thought to have had their own belt-driven axle generator to charge their own batteries.

The 280 hp (209 kW) railcars were fitted with fluorescent lighting, likely a first for the Victorian Railways; lighting in the 102hp, 153hp and trailer units was the then-standard 20W incandescent light bulbs. Trailers were fed power via jumper cables from the attached driving motor. Trailers 54MT and 56MT were provided with batteries interposed between the power feed and the lighting circuits. Originally each unit was delivered with a single, large headlamp at each end; 6RM was known to still have this by November 1957. Within a few years twin sealed-beam headlights were fitted to the 280hp units, and this was rolled out across the fleet by the mid-1960s. Bell communication was provided in most, but not all, 102hp motors and perhaps some trailers, for communication between the driver and guard (if present), and to request an upcoming stop.

The light construction of the vehicles proved problematic, with many engine units needing full rebuilds by 1954.

It has been reported that the 280 hp (209 kW) units had provision for multiple unit control, but that this feature was never utilised. As a result, when running in multiple each unit needed to have its own driver, the two communicating through the standard whistle codes used on locomotives. A trial run with two 280 h.p. units was made to Daylesford circa late 1952, with an experimental coupling made at Newport Workshops. Later tests with coupled railcars worked by two drivers were run to Wonthaggi and Wangaratta.

In later years the railcars' already poor riding qualities had deteriorated, especially due to their light construction. By the late 1970s the Walkers had reached the end of their lives, with a number of railcars being withdrawn from service during 1978 and 1979. By 1980 only 82RM, 85RM and 91RM remained in service. The last 280 hp (209 kW) Walker railmotor ran on 17 September 1980, with 82RM operating the 08:00 service from Melbourne to Woodend and return.

=== Liveries ===
Each unit was originally painted in all-over royal blue, with silver roofs, striping and highlighting. After the first of the B class diesels was delivered, the Walkers then in service were repainted, with gold replacing the silver. Over time, the roofs were repainted blue to hide grime, and the logos and striping were made simpler. To improve visibility at level crossings, the cars had thin orange stripes added in the 1950s, followed by a wide orange "dayglo" band over the top of the yellow stripe below window level. Dayglo was designed to look fairly normal in daylight, but to become reflective at night. These stripes were removed from 1968.

A number of internal themes were used, with some cars having ivory ceilings and green and brown walls; others had blue ceilings with brown walls. All cars were fitted with seats upholstered in brown leather.

== Classes ==
=== 102hp & 153hp ===
The final fleet included 13x 102 hp (76 kW) engine/driving units 1-13RM and 16x 153 hp (114 kW) engine/driving units 20-35RM which looked similar, though later 153hp units could be distinguished by the different motor unit windscreen shape.

==== Long and short-van passenger units ====
The 102hp and 153hp driving units shared between them a group of 27 passenger trailing units, each mounted on only one bogie, and pivoting over the associated motor unit. This left one motor unit of each type spare. The trailing units were not identified normally when in service, but some correspondence notes individual identities No.101 to No.112 and No.220 to No.234. This was marked on a small plate mounted on the door from the driver's compartment to the passenger saloon, on the side facing the driver. (Note: An earlier version of this article noted that the 102hp Walkers' passenger units were numbered No.100 to No.111, but the claim was unsourced.)

It is not clear whether the 102-associated and 153-associated trailing units could be interchanged across classes, though no difference between the two groups is immediately apparent from the general outline drawings. The passenger units were all identical with room for 18 1st class and 22 2nd class seated passengers plus 2 LT (2,032 kg) luggage, except for 100, 104 and 220, which had 18+27 seats and room for only 1.25 LT (1,270 kg) of luggage; their tare weight was a ton less than the rest of the fleet. The small-van passenger units could be identified externally by having six, rather than five, passenger windows between the van door and the passenger door.

Comparing handwritten amendments to the various diagrams for these railmotors, it seems likely that 1RM and 2RM were delivered with the small-van trailers, and that the latter trailer was transferred to 5RM at a later date e.g. during regular maintenance activities.

Recorded sightings include:

Date/s	Unit/s
1948 to February 1949	1RM and 2RM
July 1950	1RM and 5RM
November 1951	1RM and 2RM
June 1955 to June 1957	1RM and 5RM
October 1958 to October 1960	1RM and 3RM
August 1961 to September 1961	3RM and 5RM
January 1962 to July 1962	3RM and 8RM
November 1962 to June 1971	8RM and 13RM
March 1973	6RM and 8RM
1974 to August 1978	3RM and 6RM or 8RM

These sightings may give clues as to the specific allocation of van units No.101 and No.102, but it is not definitive.

Similarly, 20RM was probably originally allocated a small trailer, which later ended up being transferred to 21RM.

Newsrail April 1982 records the small-van units as "11, 12 and 20", and attached to 3RM as of 8 June 1976, and 31RM as of 1 January 1977.

==== 4RM General Motors unit ====
Between 1958 and 1960 4RM was re-engined, replacing its Gardner 102 hp (76 kW) engine with a General Motors 4082 engine (probably a 4/71) coupled to an Allison TCS2D534 torque converter. There were no external changes, but the internal arrangements were vastly altered. With the changes it was allowed a higher speed than other 102s, 50 mph (80 km/h) instead of 45 mph (72 km/h), and generally used on runs between Melbourne and either Seymour (Monday to Saturday 7:10pm down and 9:30 up) or Geelong (Friday evening Up theatre service).

=== 280hp ===
Separate to the paired units, railmotors 80-92RM consisted of two driving/sitting units, one either side of the power unit that gave its identity to the full consist. Originally, 80-91RM were in service and 92RM was spare without attached driving/passenger units.

One unit in each pair was fitted with seating for 38 1st class passengers, and the other had 56 2nd class passengers, for a total of 94 seats. Each was also capable of holding 1 LT (1,016 kg) of luggage; only the train crew were permitted to walk through the centre motor unit engine room.

Unlike the 102 hp (76 kW) and 153 hp (114 kW) variants, the driving/passenger units of the 280 hp (209 kW) series were classed A880-A891 for the 1st class units, and B880-B891 for the 2nd class units. It is not known whether the A and B units were unique in some way, or effectively mirrors of each other with different window spacing and internal arrangements; therefore it is not known whether an A+RM+A or B+RM+B unit could have worked, though it certainly never happened in practice.

=== Trailers ===
To go with the Walker railmotors (particularly the 153hp varieties), sixteen trailer cars were built. The first were delivered as class RMT, numbers 50 and 51; they were reclassed to MT in 1949, and further deliveries brought the class up to 64MT.

Each was mounted on two bogies with no driving stands, so they required a runaround at terminal stations. Stylistically, they matched the 102 hp (76 kW) and 153 hp (114 kW) railcars, and were a little less tall than the 280 hp (209 kW) type.

Each trailer had capacity for 16 1st, 22 2nd seated passengers and 2 tons of luggage, except 55MT fitted with 38 2nd-class seats instead of a mixture.

Like the motors, these trailers were not fitted with standard couplings so special arrangements had to be made when it was necessary to move one of the trailers with a normal locomotive.

Trailers were almost always allocated to work with 153hp motors; the only recorded instance of a 102hp Walker railmotor regularly working with a trailer was on the Kerang-Koondrook tramway from 5 February 1962; that line was relatively flat, had a very low track speed limit, and carried an average of sixty passengers each way per day in 1961 including Kerang school traffic.

== In service ==
=== Early trials ===
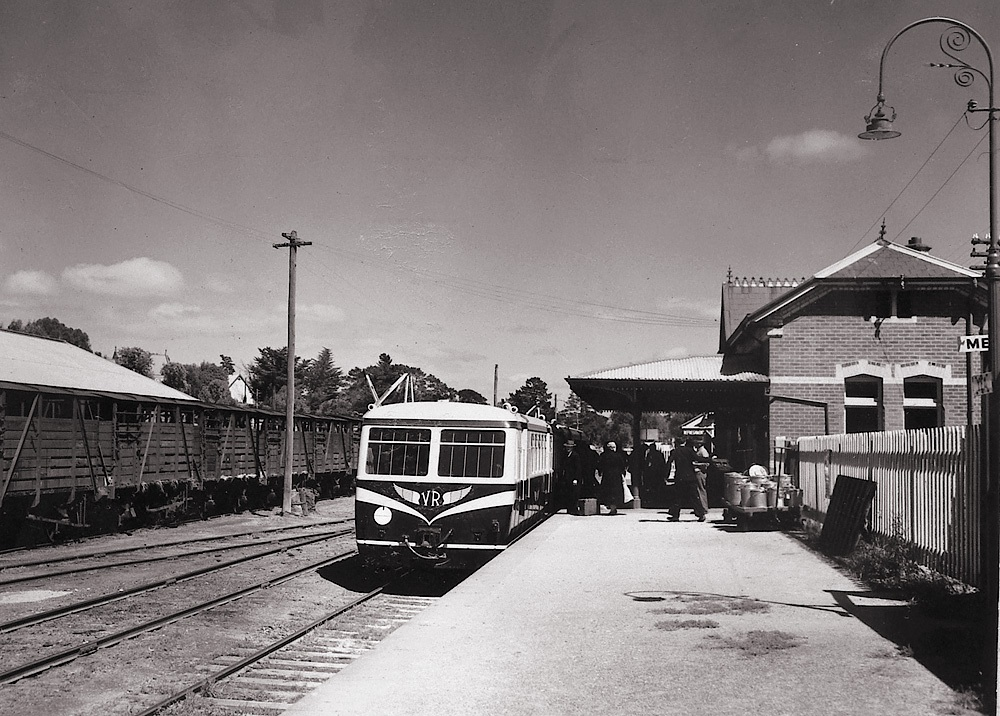
280hp Walker at Mansfield, November 1954

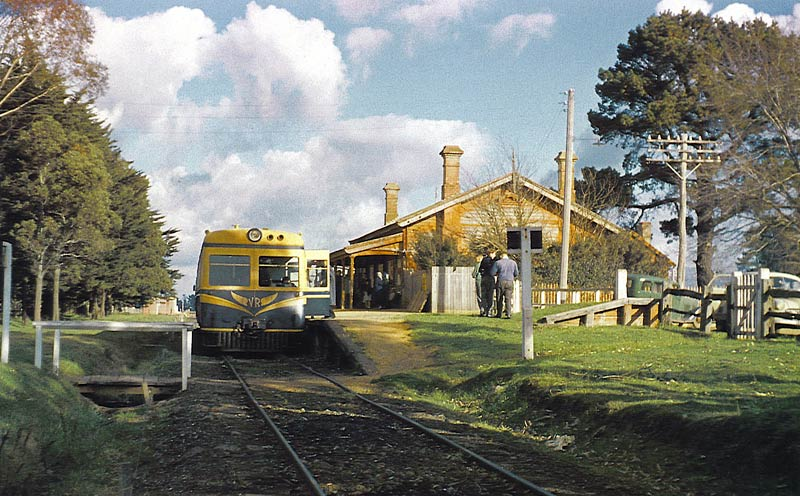
Walker railcar at Romsey

The first run was on 15 March 1948, between Heathcote and Wallan on the North Eastern line; this was with 102 hp (76 kW), 1RM. The first 153 hp (114 kW) unit ran from Spencer Street to Daylesford, until that roster was taken by the first of the 280 hp (209 kW) units - 80RM - on 6 June 1950.

1RM had made a test run to Kilmore and been put on display to schoolchildren there before it entered service; by May 1949 it had run 37,282 mi (60,000 km). 2RM entered service shortly after 1RM, having been inspected by the Governor at the time.

The 102hp Walker railmotors, in the year from the first entering service, operated on five routes: Wallan-Heathcote, Ararat-Hamilton, Ouyen-Pinnaroo, Rushworth-Girgarre and Numurkah-Picola. Each of these services replaced an existing AEC railmotor. The 153hp Walkers started service on the Melbourne-Daylesford line and were later superseded by the 280hp Walkers on the same line. Similarly, the Melbourne-Tallarook-Mansfield run was rostered for a Walker, probably a 153hp unit, from December 1948. By July 1950 the trains were running from Mansfield to Melbourne and return, once per day exccept Sundays.

The first 153hp rosters, as of December 1949, were Ballan-Ballarat, Ararat-Portland and Traralgon-Maffra.

In the period late 1951 – mid 1952, the 280hp Walkers began to develop cracked axles, necessitating their immediate withdrawal from service for rectification. During this time a number of 153hp railmotors were redeployed on the services that had been previously worked by the 280hp units, and about half the 102hp fleet (2, 4, 6, 8 and 11RM) were recalled from various regional branch lines to cover for 153hp rosters based in Melbourne.

=== Deployment by era ===
When the railcars entered service, some lines received a service boost that was ultimately short-lived. Examples for early uses of 102hp railmotors include:

From	To	Distance	District	Roster	Start	End	Notes
Seymour	Rushworth	44 mi (70.217 km)	North-eastern	102hp	1 August 1948	14 January 1959	
Seymour	Girgarre	57 mi (92.296 km)	North-eastern	102hp	1 August 1948	30 July 1952	
Numurkah	Picola	21 mi (33.263 km)	North-eastern	102hp	13 September 1949	21 October 1951	Replaced by Leyland railcar
Shepparton	Katamatite	34 mi (54.585 km)	North-eastern	102hp	13 September 1949	1 May 1953	Except 1 November 1952 to 17 November 1952 when cut back to Dookie
Wodonga	Tallangatta	26 mi (41.201 km)	North-eastern	102hp	10 October 1949	2 October 1961	
Dimboola	Rainbow	41 mi (66.576 km)	Western & South-western	102hp	4 May 1953	1 February 1954	
Piangil	Yungera	23 mi (36.261 km)	Northern & midland	102hp	2 December 1953	3 September 1954	
Hamilton	Casterton	48 mi (76.739 km)	Western & South-western	102hp	15 May 1954	31 July 1956	

The 102hp Walkers soon saw use on the Bendigo-Deniliquin and Ararat-Portland services, and by the time the 91RM was delivered, Mansfield, Wonthaggi, Woomelang and Wangaratta were also being served by the units. The long Glenrowan – Wangaratta section often saw the railcars exceed the 60 miles per hour (97 km/h) speed limit.

As at January 1953, 102hp Walkers were rostered on nine routes: Horsham-Goroke, Ararat-Hamilton, Ouyen-Pinnaroo, Maryborough-Ararat, Castlemaine-Maryborough, Wodonga-Tallangatta, Benalla-Yarrawonga, Shepparton-Cobram and Seymour-Rushworth. By 13 August 1956 Ballarat-Linton, Swan Hill-Piangil and Morwell-Mirboo North had been added, Shepparton-Cobram had been altered to Numurkah-Cobram, Seymour-Rushworth and Castlemaine-Maryborough had been removed, and, due to fuel shortages, Ararat-Hamilton had been suspended and replaced with a locomotive-hauled train. By 1962 the 102hp roster had been increased to ten routes. As of August 1962 the full list was Horsham-Goroke, Ararat-Hamilton, Ouyen-Pinnaroo, Swan Hill-Piangil, Kerang-Koonrook, Castlemaine-Maryborough, Benalla-Yarrawonga, Shepparton-Cobram and Nyora-Wonthaggi. This left two spare passenger units and three spare motor units within the 102hp series.

A snapshot of the Walker allocations in 1963 is given in the table below:

From	To	Distance	District	Roster	Notes
Ararat	Hamilton	66 mi (107 km)	Western & South-Western	102hp	
Ararat	Hamilton	66 mi (107 km)	Western & South-Western	153hp	
Ararat	Portland	119 mi (192 km)	Western & South-Western	280hp	
Ballarat	Ararat	60 mi (97 km)	Western & South-Western	102hp	
Ballarat	Linton	28 mi (45 km)	Western & South-Western	153hp	
Ballarat	Ballan	21 mi (34 km)	Western & South-Western	153hp	
Benalla	Yarrawonga	40 mi (65 km)	North-Eastern	102hp	
Bendigo	Deniliquin	100 mi (161 km)	Northern & Midland	153hp	
Bendigo	Cohuna	85 mi (136 km)	Northern & Midland	153hp	
Castlemaine	Maryborough	34 mi (55 km)	Northern & Midland	102hp	
Dimboola	Serviceton	62 mi (100 km)	Western & South-Western	153hp	
Echuca	Balranald	128 mi (206 km)	North-Eastern	153hp	
Kyabram	Echuca	21 mi (34 km)	Northern & Midland	153hp	School Train, with up to three trailers
Frankston	Mornington	13 mi (21 km)	Metropolitan	153hp	
Frankston	Stony Point	19 mi (31 km)	Metropolitan	280hp	
Geelong	Ballarat	52 mi (83 km)	Western & South-Western	280hp	
Horsham	Goroke	42 mi (68 km)	Western & South-Western	102hp	
Kerang	Koondrook	14 mi (23 km)	Northern & Midland	102hp	
Lilydale	Healesville	16 mi (25 km)	Metropolitan	153hp	
Lilydale	Warburton	24 mi (39 km)	Metropolitan	153hp	
Melbourne	Seymour	62 mi (99 km)	Metropolitan	153hp	Regular roster of 128hp modified 4RM
Melbourne	Mansfield	131 mi (211 km)	Metropolitan	153hp	
Melbourne	Werribee	20 mi (32 km)	Metropolitan	280hp	
Melbourne	Leongatha	79 mi (127 km)	Metropolitan	280hp	
Melbourne	Daylesford	75 mi (121 km)	Metropolitan	280hp	
Melbourne (Note: The 1963 Woomelang service may have started/ended at Ballarat.)	Woomelang	268 mi (432 km)	Metropolitan	280hp	Via Geelong
Melbourne	Wonthaggi	87 mi (140 km)	Metropolitan	280hp	
Morwell	Mirboo North	20 mi (32 km)	Eastern & South-Eastern	102hp	
Numurkah	Cobram	22 mi (35 km)	North-Eastern	102hp	
Nyora	Wonthaggi	30 mi (49 km)	Eastern & South-Eastern	102hp	
Ouyen	Pinnaroo	61 mi (98 km)	Northern & Midland	102hp	
Swan Hill	Piangil	27 mi (44 km)	Northern & Midland	102hp	
Traralgon	Maffra	34 mi (55 km)	Eastern & South-Eastern	153hp	
Wallan	Heathcote	44 mi (71 km)	North-Eastern	153hp	

Some of these rosters required multiple units.

As of 24 March 1976, nine railcars were based in Melbourne, for runs to Bacchus Marsh, Leongatha, Donald (in lieu of Woomelang), Seymour, Werribee, Daylesford and Kyneton. Most of these were rostered for 280hp units. A 153hp roster did exist for Benalla to Yarrawonga and that does not appear in the lists below, indicating that specific motor must have been under repair at the time, and that the 102hp motor listed as spare at Bendigo may not have been able to keep the schedule. Other 102hp Walkers were not in used because of line closures, such as to Heathcote, Goroke, Pinaroo, Balranald and Warburton.

=== Deployment by region ===
The Victorian Railways was divided into a number of administrative groups for different purposes, but one of the more common methods was by geographic region.

The Walker railcars served all five of these at different times. This article splits Walker deployment by the same regions, to help develop a narrative. The majority of 102hp Walker deployments appear to be branch lines from the North-eastern region, defined as the lines passing through Seymour station on the mainline to Albury and along the Goulburn Valley corridor to Shepparton and beyond. The 153hp Walkers, with trailers, were typically allocated to regional branch lines that would have had low patronage, except for the high levels of school student traffic. Examples included the Koondrook-Kerang (120hp), Swan Hill-Piangil, Kyabram-Echuca, Linton-Ballarat and Ballarat-Maryborough runs. 280hp Walkers seemed more centralised on trips based in Melbourne and running commuter or medium-distance regional trips, including a handful that are today considered part of metropolitan Melbourne. Patronage would have been a factor here, but some consideration must have been given to maintenance requirements, such as a desire to keep common spare parts in only a few depots.

==== North-eastern region ====
The first run served was the Wallan-Heathcote line from 15 March 1948. From 7 July 1949 it was extended to Melbourne, and by July 1950 the roster had changed to a 153hp unit, starting daily (Sundays excluded) from Heathcote with a return trip to and from Melbourne. Sometime after 13 April 1953 the service reverted to a 102hp motor, which ran through to the last service on 20 June 1965. The second 102hp railmotor roster was between Ararat and Hamilton, starting from 1 July 1948. (Note: The working time table of September 1948 shows the southbound Ararat-Hamilton service as a Walker and the northbound as an AEC; this is assumed to be an error.) The service connected at Ararat with a newspaper train from Melbourne and The Overland from Adelaide, and on weekends connections were made at Hamilton for trains to Melbourne. The service from Ararat was replaced with a steam train due to a fuel shortage between 28 November 1951 and 13 April 1953, though during April 1952, a 102hp Walker was based at Hamilton providing return trips to Ararat. Between 16 August 1954 and sometime before June 1957, a 153hp unit was rostered instead. As of October 1958, the 102hp motor was scheduled from Ararat at 9:20 am, Hamilton 11:25 am to 5 pm (1:45 pm Saturdays), returning to Ararat 7:10 pm (3:50 pm Saturdays), with no Sunday service. A later roster change saw a 153hp railmotor based at Ararat also working trips to Ballarat and Stawell on Sundays. The Walkers on the Portland line were replaced by Tulloch DRC railcars in the early 1970s, based at Portland. Those services connected at Portland with trains to Melbourne, and ran from Portland to Ararat via Hamilton; but Hamilton/Ararat service was retained, upgraded from a 102hp to 153hp unit. That service remained through to November 1974, but had been removed from the working time table a year later.

Seymour to Girgarre was a Walker roster by November 1948. By Easter of 1950 a Walker was running to Girgarre, with a Leyland working to Rushworth. By July 1950 the daily service, excluding Sundays, was from Rushworth to Murchison East, return to Girgarre in the morning, and reverse in the afternoons. On Monday, Tuesday, Wednesday and Saturday the morning service was extended to Seymour, and the same for the Saturday afternoon service. The railmotor was upgraded to 153hp with trailer for some trips in the early 1950s due to migrant camp traffic, but had reverted to 102hp by 29 June 1952. The service was trimmed to only link Rushworth, not Girgarre, by November 1954, and that timetable showed a passenger mail motor (essentially a seven-seater car, fitted with railway wheels) rather than a Walker. The service was cancelled after 13 January 1956.

The lines between Shepparton-Katamatie and Numurkah-Picola were run by alternating 102hp Walkers and AEC railmotors from 13 September 1949. Katamatite had one or two daily return services Monday to Saturday, and Picola only one daily service. During Easter 1950 the Picola line was made an AEC, and Katamatite a Walker. In July 1950 the Picola service was a three-day pattern based at Numurkah, with Monday to Wednesday and Thursday to Saturday consisting of four Picola and one Cobram return trips; three one-way trips were made the first day, five the second day (including Cobram), and two on the third. The 102hp was replaced by Leyland 52RM on 21 October 1951, reportedly due to the inferior ride quality of the 102hp. When 52RM cracked an axle it was replaced by classmate 53RM, which remained on the service until the last day of service on 30 July 1954. The Katamatite service was briefly cut back to Dookie between 1 November 1952 and 17 November 1952, and wholly withdrawn from 29 April 1953.

From 26 September 1949 the AEC of Shepparton-Cobram was replaced with a 102hp Walker. Within a few months the schedule was a daily return trip Monday to Friday, and two trips on Saturdays. During Easter 1954 a 153hp Walker with trailer was substituted on the Numurkah line, running in the region for six days. By July 1958 the 102hp Walker ran six Numurkah trips per week (four AM, two PM), as well as a Wednesday Shepparton return, and three weekly Strathmerton afternoon trips (one Monday, two Friday); this schedule was designed to connect with trains to and from Melbourne. The pattern remained in place through November 1973; the last railmotor service was on 8 November 1975, after which the Melbourne trains were extended to Cobram.

102hp motors were used between Wodonga and Tallangatta from 10 October 1949, with three return trips daily except Sundays, connecting with trains to and from Melbourne. The service was briefly extended to Darbyshire for track maintenance crews in October 1960, though was made available to the public. The last service was 30 September 1961, following completion of the Hume Dam expansion.

In July 1950 the Benalla-Yarrawonga service was worked by a PERM, which was replaced with a 102hp Walker from 6 January 1952. It was replaced with a 153hp Walker and trailer from 29 November 1952; the trailer was temporary, but the 153hp Walker remained until it was replaced by a 102hp unit by the 3 October 1960 working time table. The service at the time was two daily return trips, excluding Sundays, from Yarrawonga, plus a third on Thursday afternoons. From 2 September 1963 to May 1967 the Walker was replaced with a DERM. The 102hp Walker briefly returned until the start of 1968, when a 153hp Walker plus trailer was provided for passenger services; the 102hp was then used by trackworkers between Benalla and the Euroa-Creighton mainline section. From May 1968 the 153hp motor without trailer was used, and this stayed in place until 1976 when the refurbished 56RM (a DERM) was rostered; that remained until the last passenger service on 9 December 1978.

The July 1950 working time table included times for a 102hp Walker on the Wangaratta-Beechworth and Everton-Bright lines, but these continued to be served by mixed trains.

==== Northern & Midland region ====
Ouyen to Pinnaroo was given a Walker service by November 1948; it is not known whether it was a 102hp or 153hp roster, but the former is more likely. The service made three return trips per week, connecting with overnight trains between Mildura and Melbourne. When the Mildura Sunlight was introduced in 1957, the Walker roster was changed to Tuesday and Thursday return trips, Friday eastbound and Saturday westbound. After the Sunlight was replaced with The Vinelander in 1967 the former arrangement was reinstated, with return trips from Ouyen on Mondays, Wednesdays and Fridays. The service was deleted from 2 November 1968.

Around the middle of 1949 the Bendigo-Cohuna line was expected to receive a 153hp Walker. By 10 November 1951 the line was served by a 102hp unit, though this was not specified in the working time table and may have been due to shortages caused by axle problems with the 280hp units, whose rosters were instead being covered by 153hp units. Through to the end of passenger services on 11 June 1979 the Cohuna service was almost entirely 153hp units, with the occasional DERM.

As of January 1950 the Castlemaine-Maryborough line was served by locomotive-hauled passenger, mixed, and cargoods trains. A 153hp Walker had been allocated by 10 November 1951 with two return trips daily (except Sundays), with a trailer borrowed from the Ballarat service during holiday periods. As of September 1959 the service was being worked with a 102hp motor, which remained until the last of those was withdrawn and a 153hp Walker had to be substituted. The last run was 9 July 1977, by 24RM.

The line north from Swan Hill to Piangil and Yungera, near the border with New South Wales, was served by an AEC railmotor as of April 1952, but by 17 August 1953 this had been replaced with a 102hp motor. There was a single trip from Piangil to Swan Hill and return, daily except Sundays. From 2 December 1953 to 3 September 1954 it was extended to start and end at Yungera, but later that became a connection to a postal motor to and from Kooloonong. School trips between Swan Hill and Woorinen were added from 7 February 1961, with four rail motor stopping places established including one opposite the Swan Hill high school, at the Pye Street level crossing. All railmotor services were withdrawn on 24 December 1976.

When the Victorian Railways took over the Kerang-Koondrook tramway on 1 February 1952 they inherited the line's makeshift Ford railmotor, which became 45RM. It was replaced by a 102hp Walker from 4 February 1958 and sold privately a few months later. The 102's were permitted 20 mph (32 km/h) on the line, where all other trains were restricted to 15 mph (24 km/h). The service was a daily trip (except Sundays) from Koondrook to Kerang in the mornings and back in the afternoons, timed for students most of the year and retimed for better connections to Melbourne trains during the holidays. A trailer was added from 5 February 1962. This was the only instance of a 102hp Walker being rostered with a trailer, which was deemed necessary because the average service in 1961 carried 60 passengers; this would have been even higher during school term.

Instructions were published for scheduling of a 102hp Walker between Echuca and Balranald in November 1951, but the line at the time was only served by freight trains. The first Walker service had been introduced sometime between April 1952 and 17 August 1953, but this was probably a 153hp roster. The Walker, which also operated the Kyabram school train roster (noted below), made two return trips per week when the regular passenger train was not available. 102hp Walkers were used by February 1962 and through to 29 May 1967, though by November 1969 these had been substituted for a DERM because, being fitted with automatic couplers and more powerful engines, they could haul a small number of freight wagons. This was scheduled for Tuesdays only, collecting the wagons at Moulamein, just north of Echuca.

==== Western & South Western region ====
A 102hp Walker was allocated to shuttle trips between Ballarat and Beaufort from 24 January 1950 to 6 February 1951, after which it was replaced by a petrol-electric railmotor.

Between January 1950 and February 1950, the Horsham-Goroke line was upgraded from AEC to 102hp Walker, with a single return trip from Goroke daily except Sundays. Area residents advocated naming the train the "Tiger", "Bluebird" or "Blue Baby". The Saturday service had been abolished by October 1958, and the last run was on 16 April 1965.

By Easter 1950 (but after January 1950), the Ballarat-Maryborough-Ararat service had been converted from AEC to 102hp Walker; the service change officially started a month later on 1 May 1950. By November 1951 the Walker ran from Ararat to Maryborough, reversed then to Ballarat in the mornings, with the reverse trip in the afternoons, on Monday, Wednesday, Friday and Saturday. At the same time a 153hp motor was operating betweebn Castlemaine, Maryborough and Ballarat, supplementing a Ballarat to Woomelang service worked by a 280hp Walker. The 102hp roster portion between Maryborough and Ballarat was deleted from 2 December 1953. The service between Ararat and Maryborough remained until 4 May 1957. However, during school holidays when Linton school trains were not running, the 102hp Walker from that service would be used in lieu of a locomotive-hauled mixed train from Ballarat at 7:10 am to Maryborough, the return trip leaving Maryborough at 4:10 pm.

An early use of the newly refurbished DERMs, between Dimboola and Serviceton, was swapped for a 102hp railmotor from 6 March 1953, with a single trip from Serviceton to Dimboola and return daily except Sundays. A trailer was added to the roster before 13 August 1956; it was then downgraded to 102hp sans trailer from 13 March 1969, and restored to 153hp+MT from 1 July 1974, by which time the service had been extended to Horsham, connecting with the daily trains from and to Melbourne. The branch lines from Dimboola to Rainbow and Yaapeet were generally only served by freight trains, but a 102hp Walker was used as a postal motor between 4 May 1953 and 30 January 1954.

The Ballarat-Linton branch line was served by an AEC railmotor through to its temporary closure on 13 March 1953, due to bushfire damage, but when it reopened on 5 October 1953 a 102hp Walker had been provided. The service was daily from Linton to Ballarat and return on weekdays, except during school holidays (at least from the end of 1957, and possibly earlier) when the Motor was used on the Ballarat-Maryborough line, in lieu of a mixed train there. On 19 the 102hp Walker was replaced by a 153hp+MT set. Services continued until 1975 or 1976.

A 102hp Walker made a single daily return trip from Casterton to Hamilton and back, weekdays only, between 15 March 1954 and 31 July 1956.

==== Eastern & South-eastern region ====
A (probably) 153hp Walker in the Eastern region operated trains between Traralgon and Maffra in early 1950, and during Easter the service was upgraded to a locomotive-hauled train. The released railmotor, by now a 102hp unit, was then used on the Morwell-Mirboo North line from 22 December 1950 (excepting Easter 1952 when an AEC was returned). The service was a single daily return trip from Morwell to Mirboo North and back, daily except Saturday, until the last run on 7 September 1968.

A 102hp Walker was also briefly used on the Nyora-Wonthaggi line, from 29 June 1951 to 28 August 1951, after which it was replaced by a 280hp unit. From sometime between November 1954 and 6 September 1956 a 102hp was permanently based at Nyora, making four return trips to Wonthaggi per week. In October 1969 the motor base was changed to Wonthaggi, connecting at Nyora with through trains, with two return trips per day (one on Sundays). In the final months of the line's operation the 102hp Walkers had been withdrawn, so a 153hp Walker was substituted.

==== Metropolitan region ====
The 7:10 am daily (except Sundays) down train from Melbourne to Seymour was rostered as a 102hp Walker from May 1968 to May 1976, returning as the 9:30 am from Seymour. This train had been locomotive hauled in the 1950s and worked by a 153hp motor from 1958 to 1967. Notably, this train was often worked by 4RM with its higher power engine, which meant that motor was usually kept in Melbourne to provide additional capacity or replace a failed railmotor on some other trip. By May 1979 the Seymour train had been changed to a 280hp Walker, though it often operated as a DERM, DRC, and more recently with Sprinters.

The Frankston-Mornington route was rostered to work with a 153hp railmotor, and the Stony Point line was allocated a 280hp Walker.

==== School trains ====
The Kyabram school train was notable for having the longest-length train in the Walker roster. It operated with a 153hp Walker railmotor, but allowed for use of up to three trailers for a total of 71 LT (72 t). As of the mid-1960s the train left Kyabram at 7:37 am each school day, made about thirty intermediate stops at assorted towns and level crossings en route to Echuca, collecting as many as 200 passengers. (Note: A 153hp Walker and three trailers would have a total of 154 to 159 seats; the balance must have been standing passengers.) Many students rode bikes from home to their stop and left the bike clear of the track until they returned that afternoon. Individual carriages were allocated by gender and, if possible, by school to help manage the students' antics. Yates (2004) recalls two incidents; one where students locked the train guard in a parcels hamper; and another where "footprints mysteriously began to appear on the carriage ceilings." The whole train set had to be returned to Bendigo Workshops for repair every school holiday. As an example, the set that returned to service from the workshops for February 1974 was 27RM with trailers 62MT, 53MT and 50MT. 27RM had been the regular motor for the service at the end of the prior year, but within a few days it was replaced by 20RM. The train ran every weekeday from Kyabram, through Echuca to Echuca Wharf in the mornings, stabled at Echuca during the day then made the opposite trip in the afternoon. Based on the times provided in the May 1963 working time table, the in-service trips averaged only 19.4 to 22 mph (31 to 35 km/h) (for Down and Up trips respectively) because of all the intermediate stops, but the empty transfers were scheduled at an average speed of 40 mph (64 km/h). As of 1963 the train stabled overnight at Kyabram on Tuesday and Thursday nights, and at Echuca the rest of the time. By 1974 the normal practice was for the railmotor and trailers to stable overnight at Kyabram, with the crew from Echuca riding as passengers on the early morning trip from Echuca to Toolamba, and may have used part of another railmotor trip, a maintenance trolley or a taxi to return from Kyabram at the end of the day. Otherwise, the timetable was "almost identical" to the 1950 version, except that the pre-Walker service had used a Leyland railmotor in lieu; and the 1974 schedule left Kyabram at 7:47am.

While the Kyabram school train had ceased by 1976, the Ballarat-Maryborough roster included provision for attaching two trailers at Clunes on the Down (northbound) trip in the morning; these would continue through to Maryborough and return for detaching in the afternoon. The trailers were specifically allocated to Maryborough High School. The 1976 track diagram for Clunes shows a short, 220 ft (67 m) stub siding trailing into the platform track, which could have been used to stable the two trailers overnight and save the cost in fuel and time of taking them the extra distance to and from Ballarat every day. This siding had previously been the cattle loading point.

==== Track-laying trains ====
By April 1964 a 102hp or 153hp Walker was attached to the afternoon 280hp Walker that ran from Melbourne to Geelong, detaching at Little River then returning as an extra trip. This run was provided to serve track-laying gangs who were working along the corridor. This was similar to the earlier Tallangatta service extension to Darbyshire, and the later service between Gheringhap-Inverleigh which used a 153hp Walker and trailer.

=== Incidents ===
A number of incidents have been recorded involving Walker railmotors; the majority appear to be level crossing related. These instances may have meant damage to the motor units or the passenger units in each case, though the specific passenger unit is not identified.

==== 102hp ====
An unknown 102hp Walker derailed after striking an animal between Numurkah and Waaia, on 29 April 1950

2RM failed on the Ouyen-Pinnaroo run on 23 November 1958 and had to be replaced by a classmate forwarded from Maryborough. A few years later, circa June 1961, the same unit was damaged on a Tallangatta trip.

3RM was misrouted at Kerang on 4 May 1961 and collided with a rake of grain wagons in the station yard. On 9 December 1976 while running the Mornington service, it was hit by car at Nepean Highway level crossing.

6RM 26 November 1957 derailed at the Dimboola Road level crossing while on the Horsham-Goroke line. This was similar to a derailment of 9RM on 2 July 1952, at Donald Road (near Amphitheatre) on the Ararat-Maryborough leg of the then-Ararat-Maryborough-Ballarat roster. It was working the 2:15 pm Down trip.

Lastly, 13RM struck a cow and was derailed while running the 5 pm Hamilton to Ararat trip on 12 June 1957.

=== Withdrawal and scrapping ===
35RM with unit no.224 was the first to be scrapped, on 15 October 1970. Scrapping then continued at a fairly easy pace until 1977, when VicRail decreed that branch lines in general were to be closed, rendering the units without a purpose. By this stage four 102hp and two 153hp units had been scrapped. As such, 102 hp overhauls were stopped, with failed units being held awaiting scrapping instead. The same policy applied to 153 hp and 280 hp units from April the next year.

4RM was the last 102 hp unit in service, withdrawn in December 1978; it survived longer because its engine unit had been replaced with a General Motors unit, permitting a 50 mph (80 km/h) maximum speed and allowing it to closer match the timetables applicable to the higher-horsepower units.

Withdrawals of the larger units accelerated, and by the end of 1979 only two 153hp and three 280hp units, 22, 32, 82, 85 and 91RM, were still in service. The latter two of that list were withdrawn next; 85RM suffered a bearing failure and continued on to Ballarat North Workshops on one engine; however, its body condition was deemed too poor to be worth repairing, so it was transferred to Newport Workshops and was stored there. 82RM was the last of the 280 hp units to go, after running an 8:00 Melbourne to Woodend and return trip on 17 September 1980.

32RM ran with 56MT through to November 1980, when the engine was withdrawn on account of a much needed overhaul (which was started, but never completed by VicRail). 22RM and 64MT stayed in service, usually running the 9:11 am Melbourne to Leongatha and return trip on weekdays, occasionally forming a Sunbury trip or two after arriving back in Melbourne. On Saturdays the unit pair would run on the Werribee shuttles, and occasionally to either Bacchus Marsh or Seymour as railmotor shortages dictated. but eventually, the gearbox failed and the unit was withdrawn following its return from Leongatha on 1 April 1981.

== Preservation ==
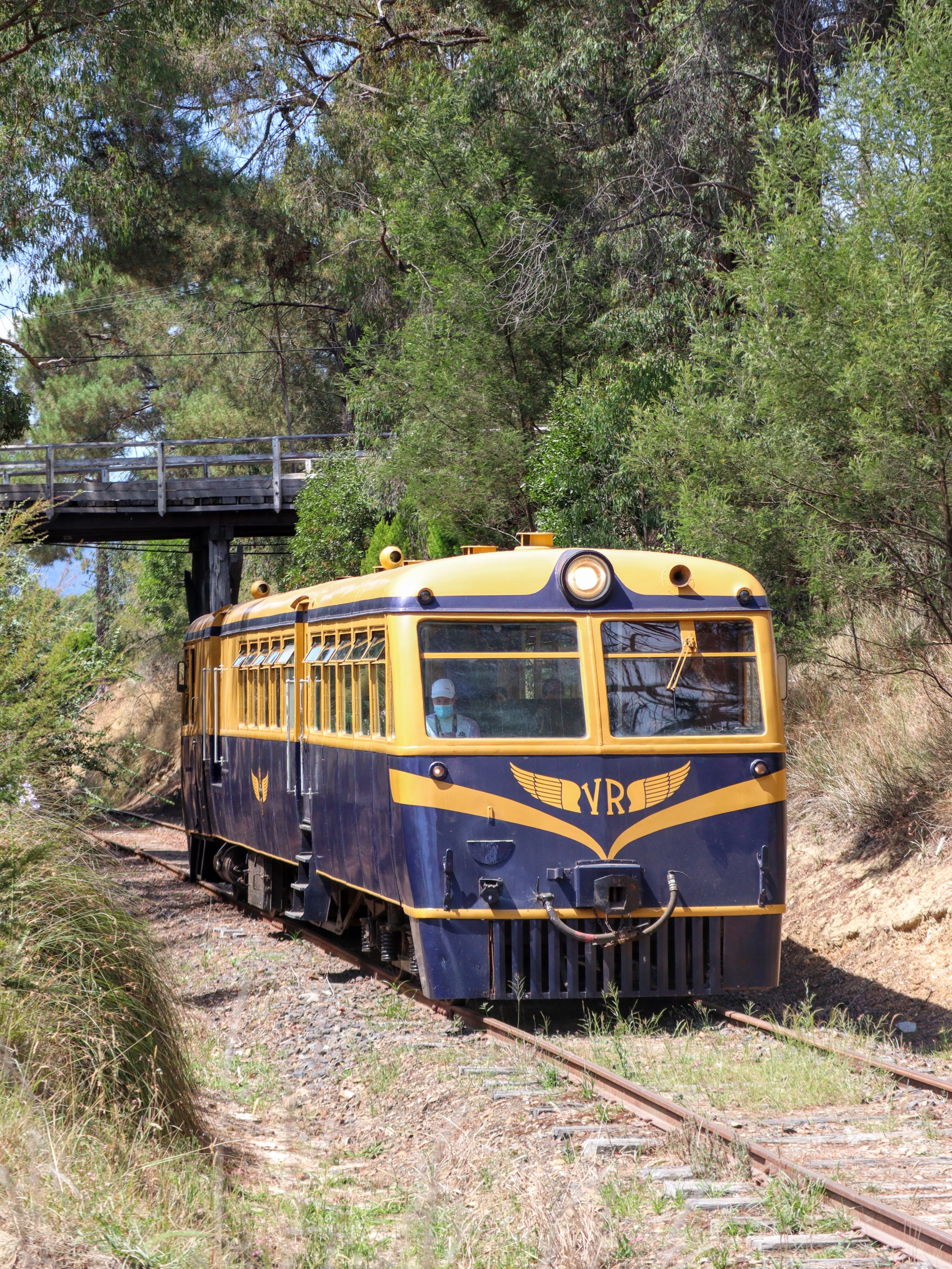
Restored Walker Rail Motor, 22RM, runs on the Yarra Valley Railway in Melbourne

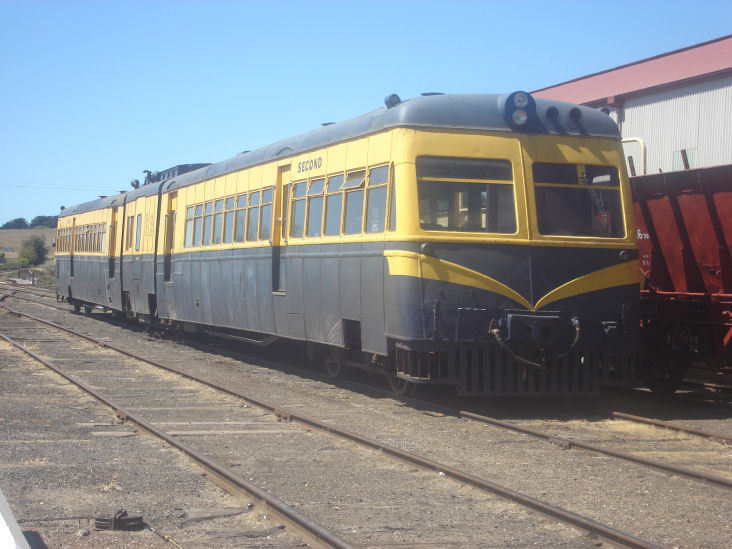
280 hp Walker Railcar at Daylesford

In 1981, two railmotors and a trailer – 32RM, 91RM and 56MT – were scheduled to be transferred to the SteamRanger Heritage Railway at Victor Harbor, South Australia. 91RM failed on the Ingliston Bank and the three ended up stored at Ballarat East. Later, the three units were purchased by the Central Highlands Tourist Railway, now the Daylesford Spa Country Railway. 7RM was being held at Newport for future use on the Victorian Goldfields Railway. 22RM was static in the Newport Railway Museum, with 85RM held for future addition, and 59MT was similarly allocated, but was badly vandalised, potentially to be replaced by 64MT. 82RM was stored at Wodonga for a proposed tourist service at Tallangatta.

It is thought that the passenger units which had been with 29RM and 31RM at time of scrapping had been sold for use as sheds somewhere in the Victorian countryside. Another, large-van passenger unit may exist at Emberton, having been removed from 1RM when it was scrapped in 1971.

As of 20 January 2025, the known remaining units are:

- 7RM – Stored at Daylesford.
- 22RM – with No.225 – Owned by VicTrack, allocated to Newport Railway Museum, sub-allocated to Yarra Valley Tourist Railway. In service.
- 24RM – Possibly with No.228. Stored in poor condition at Yarra Valley Tourist Railway (previously owned by Tallangatta Valley Steam Preservation Society at Huon).
- 28RM – Trailer exists in private ownership.
- 32RM – In service at Daylesford.
- 82RM – with No.887A and No.891B – Stored at Daylesford.
- 85RM – with two units unidentified – Stored at Daylesford.
- 91RM – with No.880A and No.887B – In service at Daylesford.
- 56MT – Stored at Daylesford.
- 58MT – Under restoration at the Yarra Valley Tourist Railway.
- 64MT – Location unknown.

== Individual vehicle histories ==
=== 102hp, 153hp and passenger units ===
Railmotor	Entered service	Withdrawn	Scrapped	Status 24 March 1976	Current Status	Notes
1RM	4 March 1948	1971	19 November 1971	Scrapped	Scrapped	
2RM	14 March 1948	8 April 1977		Swan Hill (for Piangil)	Scrapped	Sighted Mirboo North September 1968. Destroyed at Ravenswood 17 March 1976, but reconstituted with donor parts possibly from the motor unit of 11RM. The new unit remained in service until 8 April 1977, then was scrapped at Bendigo Workshops on 20 May 1977.
3RM	6 August 1948	3 April 1978 or 1 May 1978		Bendigo North Workshops	Scrapped	
4RM	15 February 1949	14 December 1978	12 June 1980	Melbourne	Scrapped	Fitted with GM motor, 128 hp.
5RM	1 June 1949	21 August 1973	24 February 1974	Scrapped	Scrapped	
6RM	23 June 1949	3 April 1978		Bendigo North Workshops	Scrapped	
7RM	22 July 1949	3 April 1978		Kerang (for Koondrook)		After withdrawal, stored at Newport Workshops with Steamrail Victoria. Transferred to Maldon on 12 July 1993. Stored, pending restoration at Daylesford Spa Country Railway
8RM	26 September 1949	3 April 1978		Bendigo (Spare)	Scrapped	
9RM	10 October 1949	17 March 1976	2 June 1976.	Bendigo (burnt out, awaiting scrapping)	Scrapped	Destroyed by fire at Ravenswood, 1 November 1975.
10RM	4 November 1949	1 May 1974 (year not clear)	June 1979	Melbourne	Scrapped	
11RM	20 December 1949	3 April 1978	30 April 1978	Maryborough (for Castlemaine)	Scrapped	Regular motor on Castlemaine-Maryborough section, as of 15 February 1974.
12RM	10 February 1950	9 December 1981		Scrapped	Scrapped	Newsrail December 1981 says withdrawn by 1977.
13RM	26 January 1955	3 April 1978		Newport Workshops	Scrapped	Original spare power unit
20RM	16 July 1948	20 February 1978	30 April 1980	Ararat (repairs)	Scrapped	Damaged in a derailment after hitting sheep. Accident occurred between Traralgon and Maffra.
21RM	16 September 1948	3 April 1978	N/A	Newport Workshops	Scrapped	21 June 1978 offered for sale.
22RM	15 November 1948	1 April 1980	13 February 1978	Newport Workshops (Spare power unit)	Allocated to Australian Railway Historical Society Museum at Newport; suballocated to Yarra Valley Tourist Railway.	Operational – Restored, paired with No.225.
23RM	5 November 1948	8 April 1977	5 May 1977	Healesville (for Lilydale)	Scrapped	
24RM	23 March 1949			Serviceton (for Horsham)	Stored at Yarra Valley Tourist Railway. In poor condition.	Sold to Tallangatta Valley Steam Preservation Society, 2 March 1983. Possibly paired with 228.
25RM	19 May 1949	26 November 1971	16 June 1972	Scrapped	Scrapped	Damaged at Benalla, 26 November 1971.
26RM	26 May 1952	8 April 1977	5 May 1977	Melbourne	Scrapped	
27RM	31 July 1952	1 May 1978		Mornington (for Frankston)	Scrapped	As of early 1974, operating with one door from 33RM. Offered for sale on 21 June 1978.
28RM	10 September 1952	1 May 1978	25 July 1980	Maffra (for Traralgon)	Motor unit scrapped, original trailer unit is in private ownership.	
29RM	6 October 1952	4 September 1979	1 July 1980	Melbourne	Scrapped	
30RM	20 November 1952	3 October 1973	22 June 1978	Wonthaggi (for Nyora)	Scrapped	
31RM	9 February 1953	21 December 1977	1 July 1980	Ballarat (for Linton)	Scrapped	Derailed between Lilydale and Coldstream on 19 February 1962.
32RM	24 March 1953	13 January 1981	N/A	Ballarat (for Maryborough)	Now at Daylesford Spa Country Railway	Operational - Restored in mid 1950s blue and gold livery. Paired with No.232.
33RM	8 July 1953	4 September 1979		Ararat (repairs)		
34RM	23 September 1953	1 May 1978		Newport Workshops		
35RM	3 September 1954	15 October 1970	15 October 1970	Scrapped	Scrapped	Original spare power unit.
No.101	4 March 1948					45 seats, reduced luggage capacity
No.102	14 March 1948	1978				
No.103	6 August 1948					
No.104	15 February 1949	1978				
No.105	1 June 1949	1978				45 seats, reduced luggage capacity
No.106	23 June 1949					
No.107	22 July 1949	1978				
No.108	26 September 1949					
No.109	10 October 1949	1978				
No.110	4 November 1949	1978				
No.111	20 December 1949	1978				
No.112	10 February 1950	1971				
No.220	16 July 1948	1978				45 seats, reduced luggage capacity
No.221	16 September 1948	1978				
No.222	15 November 1948	1978				
No.223	5 November 1948	1978				
No.224	23 March 1949	15 October 1970	15 October 1970	Scrapped	Scrapped	
No.225	19 May 1949	1980			Allocated to Australian Railway Historical Society Museum at Newport; suballocated to Yarra Valley Tourist Railway.	Operational – Restored, paired with 22RM.
No.226	23 May 1952	1977				
No.227	31 July 1952	1978				
No.228	10 September 1952	1979				Possibly paired with 24RM at Yarra Valley Tourist Railway.
No.229	6 October 1952	1981				
No.230	20 November 1952	1978				
No.231	9 February 1953	1977				
No.232	24 March 1953	1981			Now at Daylesford Spa Country Railway	Operational - Restored in mid 1950s blue and gold livery. Paired with 32RM.
No.233	8 July 1953	1979				
No.234	23 September 1953	1979				

=== 280hp and passenger units ===
Railmotor	Entered service	Withdrawn	Scrapped	Status 24 March 1976	Current Status	Notes
80RM	6 June 1950			Melbourne	Scrapped	
81RM	21 August 1950			Newport Workshops	Scrapped	
82RM	12 December 1950			Ballarat North Workshops	Now at Daylesford Spa Country Railway	Stored pending restoration. Paired with 887A and 891B. Circa 1983, was sold to Tallangatta Valley Group. Transferred Huon to Daylesford between on 15 January 1994 and 31 October 1994.
83RM	2 February 1951			Newport Workshops	Scrapped	
84RM	21 March 1951			Melbourne	Scrapped	
85RM	23 May 1951	13 February 1978		Newport (for Werribee)	Now at Daylesford Spa Country Railway	Stored pending restoration. Entered Historic Register circa 1984, allocated to Australian Railway Historical Society. Sighted at Nyora on 9 October 1994, still present by December 1998. Was previously at Moorooduc on the Mornington Tourist Railway, transferred to Daylesford circa 2017.
86RM	17 July 1951			Melbourne	Scrapped	
87RM	3 August 1951			Melbourne	Scrapped	
88RM	7 September 1951			Melbourne	Scrapped	
89RM	25 October 1951		1980.	Melbourne	Scrapped	
90RM	13 December 1951			Ballarat North Workshops	Scrapped	
91RM	30 December 1951			Crib Point (for Frankston)	Now at Daylesford Spa Country Railway	Sold into preservation circa 1984. Operational, paired with 880A and 887B.
92RM	21 October 1954			Newport Workshops (Spare power unit)	Scrapped	Original spare power unit only
880A	6 June 1950				Now at Daylesford Spa Country Railway	Operational, paired with 91RM and 887B.
881A	21 August 1950					
882A	12 December 1950					
883A	2 February 1951					
884A	21 March 1951					
885A	23 May 1951					
886A	17 July 1951					
887A	3 August 1951				Now at Daylesford Spa Country Railway	Stored pending restoration. Paired with 82RM and 891B
888A	7 September 1951					
889A	25 October 1951					
890A	13 December 1951					
891A	30 December 1951					
880B	6 June 1950					
881B	21 August 1950					
882B	12 December 1950					
883B	2 February 1951					
884B	21 March 1951					
885B	23 May 1951					
886B	17 July 1951					
887B	3 August 1951				Now at Daylesford Spa Country Railway	Operational, paired with 880A and 91RM.
888B	7 September 1951					
889B	25 October 1951					
890B	30 December 1951					
891B	30 December 1951				Now at Daylesford Spa Country Railway	Stored pending restoration. Paired with 887A and 82RM.

=== Trailers ===
Railmotor	Entered service	Withdrawn	Scrapped	Status 24 March 1976	Current Status	Notes
50MT	18 October 1948			Bendigo North Workshops		Entered service as 50RMT, recoded circa 1949
51MT	7 December 1948			Melbourne		Entered service as 51RMT, recoded circa 1949
52MT	25 February 1949			Linton (for Ballarat)		
53MT	24 June 1949			Bendigo North Workshops		
54MT	9 July 1949			Ballarat loco depot		Fitted with belt-driven axle generator and batteries
55MT	30 July 1949		1979	Clunes (for Maryborough)		All 2nd class, 38 seats
56MT	5 February 1952 (Note: Newsrail February 1982 says 5 July, not 5 February.)			Melbourne	Preserved Daylesford.	Fitted with belt-driven axle generator and batteries
57MT	11 August 1952		30 June 1977	Melbourne		
58MT	17 September 1952			Healesville (for Lilydale)		27 April 1983 – Sold to Tallangatta
59MT	24 October 1952		1982	Bendigo North Workshops		
60MT	4 December 1952			Melbourne		
61MT	17 February 1953			Melbourne		
62MT	25 November 1953			Bendigo North Workshops		
63MT	23 December 1953			Clunes (for Maryborough)		
64MT	18 June 1954			Frankston (for Crib Point or Mornington)	Preserved Healesville, formerly Huon.	13 October 1983 – Sold to Tallangatta
