= Hitachi (Australian train) =

Melbourne suburban electric multiple unit train

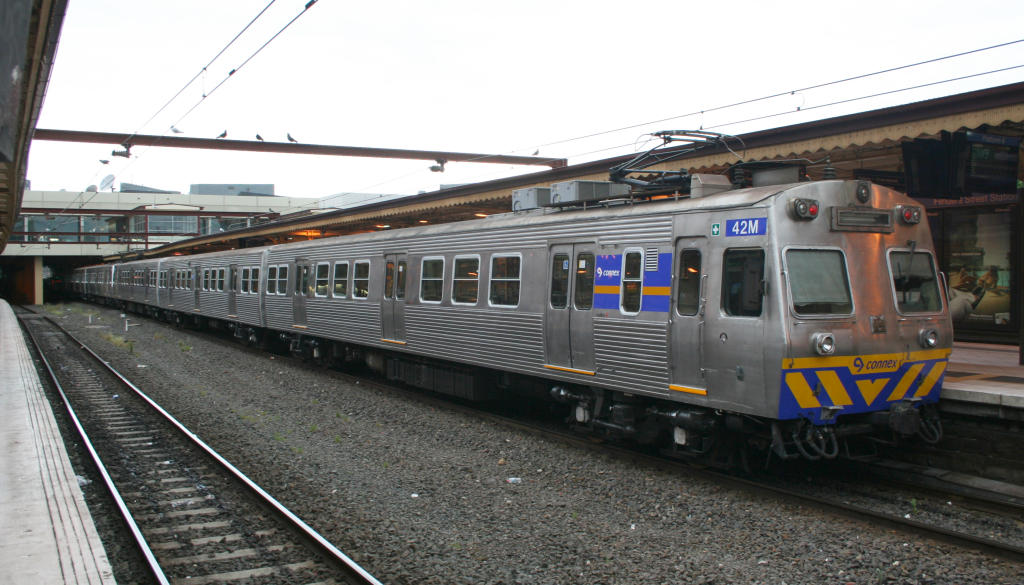
- A refurbished Hitachi at Flinders Street station, November 2007

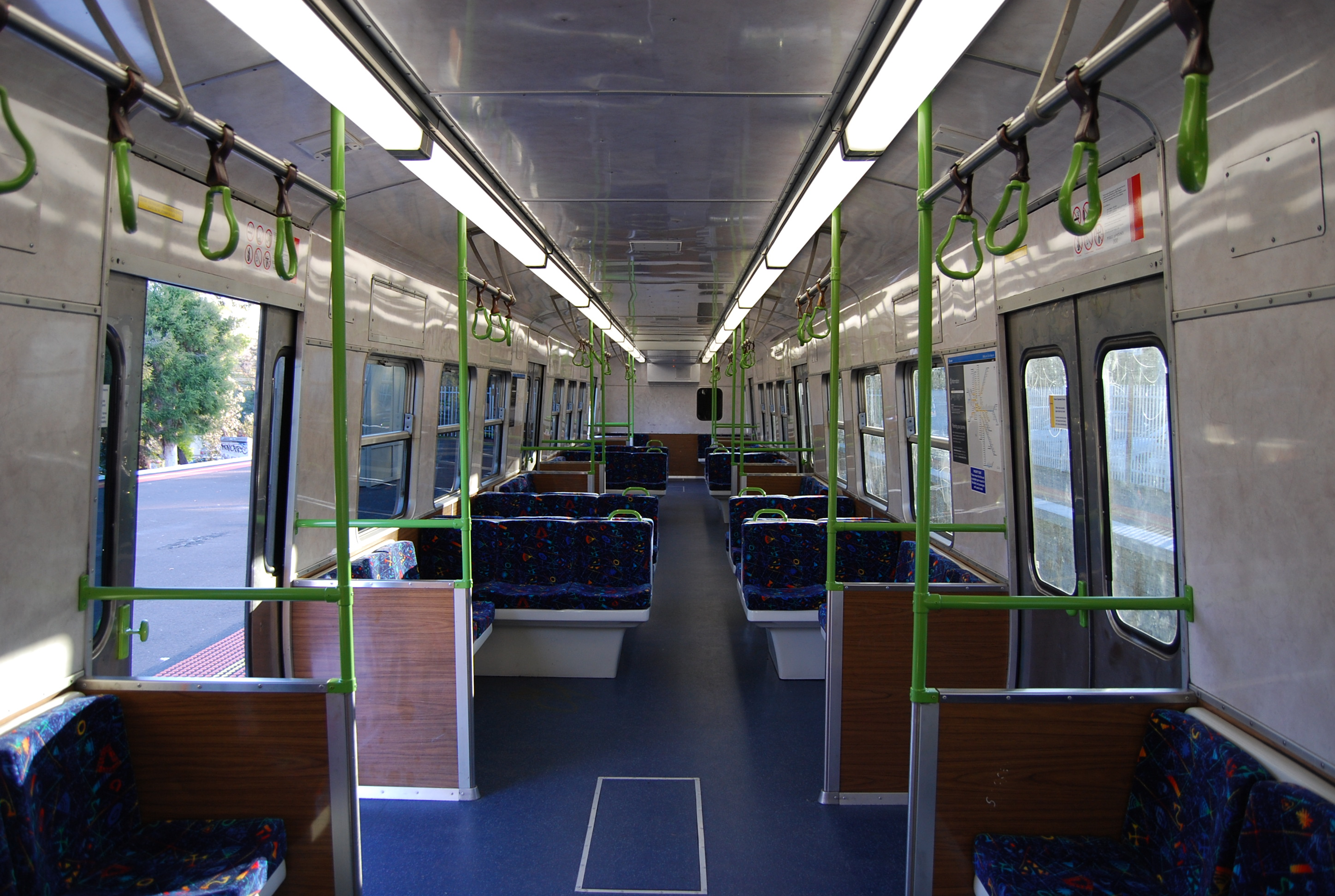
- Refurbished Hitachi interior, 2009
- Stock type: Electric Multiple Unit (EMU)
- In service: December 1972 – September 2008; November 2008 – April 2014
- Manufacturers: Commonwealth Engineering (electrics); Martin & King, Bayswater (bodies) and Somerton (motor car fit-out); Newport Workshops (trailer car fit-out)
- Replaced: Swing Door and Tait
- Constructed: 1972–1981
- Refurbished: 1992; 2007–2009
- Scrapped: 2003–2023
- Number built: 118 (3 car sets)
- Number preserved: 48 (3 car sets)
- Successor: X'Trapolis 100, Siemens Nexas
- Formation: 6 cars per unit (M-T-M-M-T-M)
- Fleet numbers: 273–300 (Motors), 1901–2017 (Trailers), 1–237 (Former Motor Numbers), 301–368 (Former Driving Trailers)
- Capacity: 536 seated (6 car)
- Operators: Historically Victorian Railways and successors, MTA, PTC, M>Train, Connex and Metro Trains Melbourne
- Depot: Newport Workshops (late 2015)
- Line served: All Melbourne suburban

Specifications
- Car body construction: Fluted stainless steel
- Car length: 23.406 m (76 ft 9.5 in) over couplers
- Width: 2.972 m (9 ft 9.0 in)
- Height: 3.759 m (12 ft 4.0 in), not including pantograph
- Floor height: 1,194 mm (3 ft 11.0 in)
- Maximum speed: 116 km/h (72 mph)
- Weight: 41 tonnes (40 long tons; 45 short tons)
- Traction motors: 4 × Hitachi HS 834 Springbourne (150 hp or 110 kW) per M car
- Power output: 450 kW (603 hp) per M car 1,790 kW (2,400 hp) per 6 car set
- Acceleration: 0.85 m/s^{2} (1.9 mph/s)
- Electric systems: 1,500 V DC (nominal) from overhead catenary
- Current collection: Stone-Faiveley 'V'-type pantograph (original builds); Metropolitan-Vickers 'Diamond'-type pantograph (used as replacements)
- Coupling system: Janney coupler
- Track gauge: 1,600 mm (5 ft 3 in) broad gauge

The Hitachi (also known as Silver trains, Martin & King or Stainless Steel) is a retired electric multiple unit train that operated on the Melbourne suburban railway network between 1972 and 2014. Electrical equipment was supplied by Commonwealth Engineering, to designs by Hitachi of Japan, leading to their official name today, although no Hitachi-supplied components were used in their construction. They were the last suburban trains in Melbourne without air conditioning. A total of 355 carriages were built between 1972 and 1981, including a replacement carriage for one written off while the fleet was still being delivered.

== Configuration ==
Based on a successful trial of longer Harris trailer cars built between 1967 and 1971, the Hitachi used carriages that were 75 feet (23 m) long, an increase from the standard 59-foot (18 m) length of earlier suburban cars. The revised carriage configuration enabled a six-car Hitachi to seat 560 passengers, up from 540 for a seven-car Harris, and allowed a maximum load of 1,500 passengers, 300 more than a Harris train.

As delivered, Hitachi trains were composed of three types of carriage: driving motor, trailer and driving trailer, coded M, T and D respectively. The cars were arranged in sets of M-T-T-M and M-D, which could be arranged together to create a six-car set. Early M and D carriages were provided with nose doors beside the driver's cab, allowing passengers to move between coupled units on a train. That feature did not last long, and instructions were soon issued to lock the doors to the cab area to prevent unauthorised access. The nose doors also tended to leak and generate draughts, so that feature was omitted from later carriages, and the door was sheeted over on existing ones.

All but one of the 68 D carriages (353D having been written off after a collision at Pakenham on 16 April 1980) had been converted into T carriages by the late 1970s, to form symmetrical M-T-M units for the opening of the City Loop. Those units could be doubled to make six car sets, configured as M-T-M-M-T-M, which became the de facto configuration in the 1990s.

The 237 motor carriages were numbered 1M to 237M, and the 117 trailer carriages, 1901T to 2017T. On 15 August 2009, the remaining Hitachi carriages were renumbered to allow for the second order of X'Trapolis trains, which also started from 1M. The remaining Hitachi M cars were renumbered from 273M up to 300M, although the new numbering did not reflect the age of each car. The numbering reflected which T car was in each set, the lowest-numbered T car received the lowest-numbered M cars, in order of which M car was already the lowest. For example, 2007T was the highest-numbered T car, so 23M was renumbered to 299M, because it was lower than 233M, which was renumbered to 300M.

== Trials, early use and adaptations ==
The first to Hitachi train to operate in revenue service, on 24 December 1972, was four-carriage set 1M-901T-902T-2M, on the St Kilda line.

Weekends in February and March 1973 saw the first four carriages being tested and advertised to the public on demonstration trips. On the afternoon of 6 March 1973, the set returned to the Workshops, where the consist was altered by swapping out 902T for 903T, and adding 301D-3M. Later, 301D was noted as having entered service with drawbars at both ends, preventing its use as a leading driving trailer. The six-carriage set was then used for brake tests between Seaford and Frankston on 8 March 1973.

A seven-car Silver train ran from Newport Workshops to Jolimont Workshops on Thursday 14 February 1974, with in-service pair 4M-305D used to transfer 4-car set 15M-911T-910T-14M, about to enter service, with an additional carriage, 902T, attached to the rear.

As originally introduced, the Silver fleet was going to use marker lights as route indications at all times, in contrast to previous fleets, which used destination discs in daytime and marker lights at night. Inadequate visibility of the marker lights during daylight led to that instruction being cancelled. Consequently, in 1973, the only daytime route indication was the destination rolls at each end of trains, and staff were expected to memorise the relevant rosters. Daylight use of the marker lamps was expected to be reintroduced from 7 February 1974 but, from February 1974, the trains were gradually fitted with route indication disc brackets. Most of the fleet had been equipped by 7 March 1974.

The fitting of shunter's steps to the ends of carriages began around March 1974, enabling division of 6-car sets into a 2- and 4-car set. Additionally, subject to special instructions regarding the locking of all doors, Hitachi trains were permitted to stable at outstations "for a few months" prior to that time.

An investigation found that people preferred a new, contoured type of seat over the original slab type, with 82.6% of those surveyed being in favour of the new design.

When the sets were reconfigured from four- and two-car consists to uniform three-car sets, most of the motor and driving cars had their end doors sealed and the internal doors removed, but 30M was noted with the internal door still fitted despite the external change. It was later noted that the external doors had only been fitted to cars 1–22M and 301–31D, and that no cars were outshopped from Newport Workshops during July 1974, possibly to accommodate the design changes including a wider driver's cabin which had been a complaint of the early units.

15M had been used to test radio equipment in the early 1980s with a special compartment fitted. The compartment, empty, was still present as at 17 July 1986.

== Service ==
Intended to replace the first generation of Swing Door and Tait electric trains, the stainless steel Hitachi was the first Melbourne suburban train to feature heated carriages and power-closing doors, operated by the guard and opened by hand. The M and D carriages were built by Martin & King, and the T carriages by Victorian Railways at their Newport Workshops.

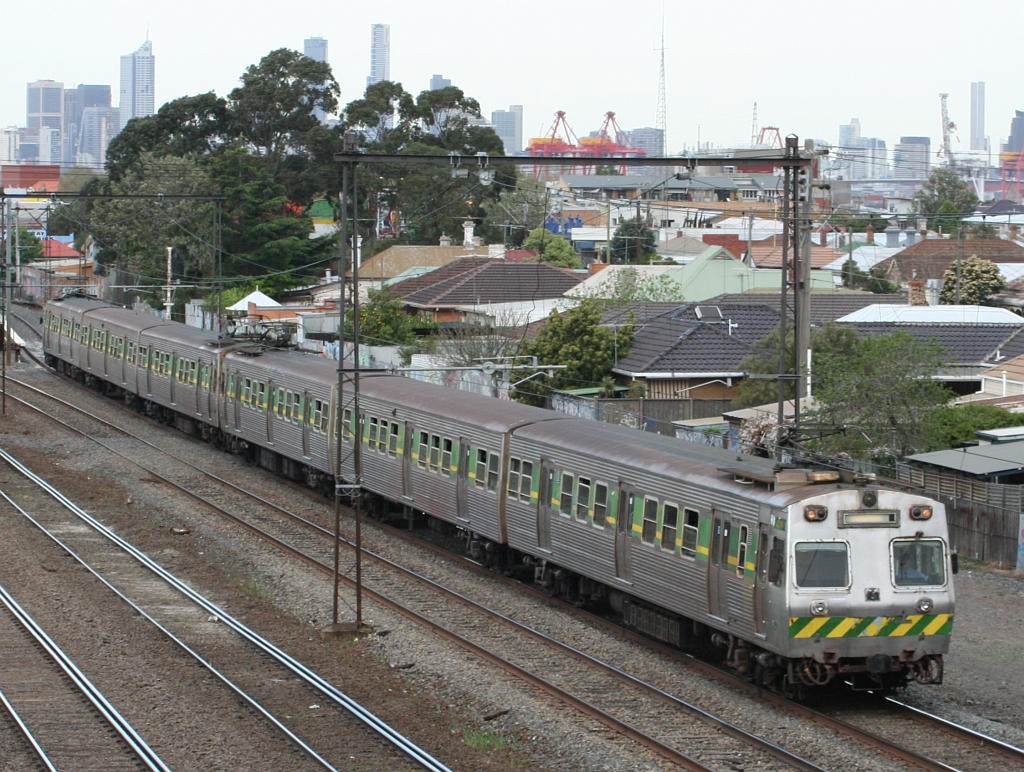
Hitachi in The Met livery near Middle Footscray

Hitachi trains originally had an unpainted, silver stainless steel livery, with carriage numbers applied to the sides. They received green and gold side stripes following the introduction of the Metropolitan Transit Authority. Side logos were altered after their re-branding as The Met, and were again altered with the privatisation of metropolitan rail services as Hillside Trains (later Connex), and Bayside Trains (later M>Train), with the latter also having branding applied to the front.

As at July 1987 the MetRail working timetable listed 234 M type motor cars, 91 regular trailers and 26 trailers converted from D cars, still fitted with isolated cabs and D type seating, for 117 total three-car sets. By this stage three motor cars had been withdrawn.

When the carriages were refurbished by Connex, they were returned to their original silver colour, with Metlink logos added near the saloon doors, Connex blue and gold striping on the front of the leading cars, and two blue and gold side panels near the driver's cab. The passenger seats also received new fabric, similar to that of Alstom-refurbished Comeng trains. With the takeover of Connex by Metro Trains, the Connex logos were covered by Metro stickers.

Beginning in 1992, the Hitachi fleet received internal, external, and cab upgrades, at the PTC's Ballarat North and Bendigo Workshops. The refurbishment included the replacement of existing rubber or carpet flooring with vinyl, the replacement of panels above the seats with a new anti-vandal material, and the substituting of the wood-grained upper panels and bone-coloured roof with off-white panels. New seat pads were provided on repainted and strengthened seat modules, luggage racks and advertising boards were removed, windows and doors overhauled, including the door-closing motors worked by air, along with a general clean of the exterior and the application of new green and gold stripes. The refurbishment of over half of the Hitachi M cars also included improved air-flow in the driver's cab and double-thickness windscreens, with aluminium replacing the original rubber surrounds. The work on the M cars had been completed by early 1994. After the upgrades were effected, M cars which had not been upgraded were no longer allowed to lead a train in revenue service, effectively making them B units.

Starting in late 2007, Hitachi sets were further modified to meet union requirements for driver's cab air conditioning, along with a refurbished interior. They were also re-stickered in Connex livery. In 2008, the remaining seven 6-car trains were again modified, and a more powerful driver's air-conditioning system replaced the small vents on the roof. However, three other "leading" cars (9M, 89M and 225M, now 277M, 281M and 296M respectively) were not modified and so were relegated to being in the centre of trains sets.

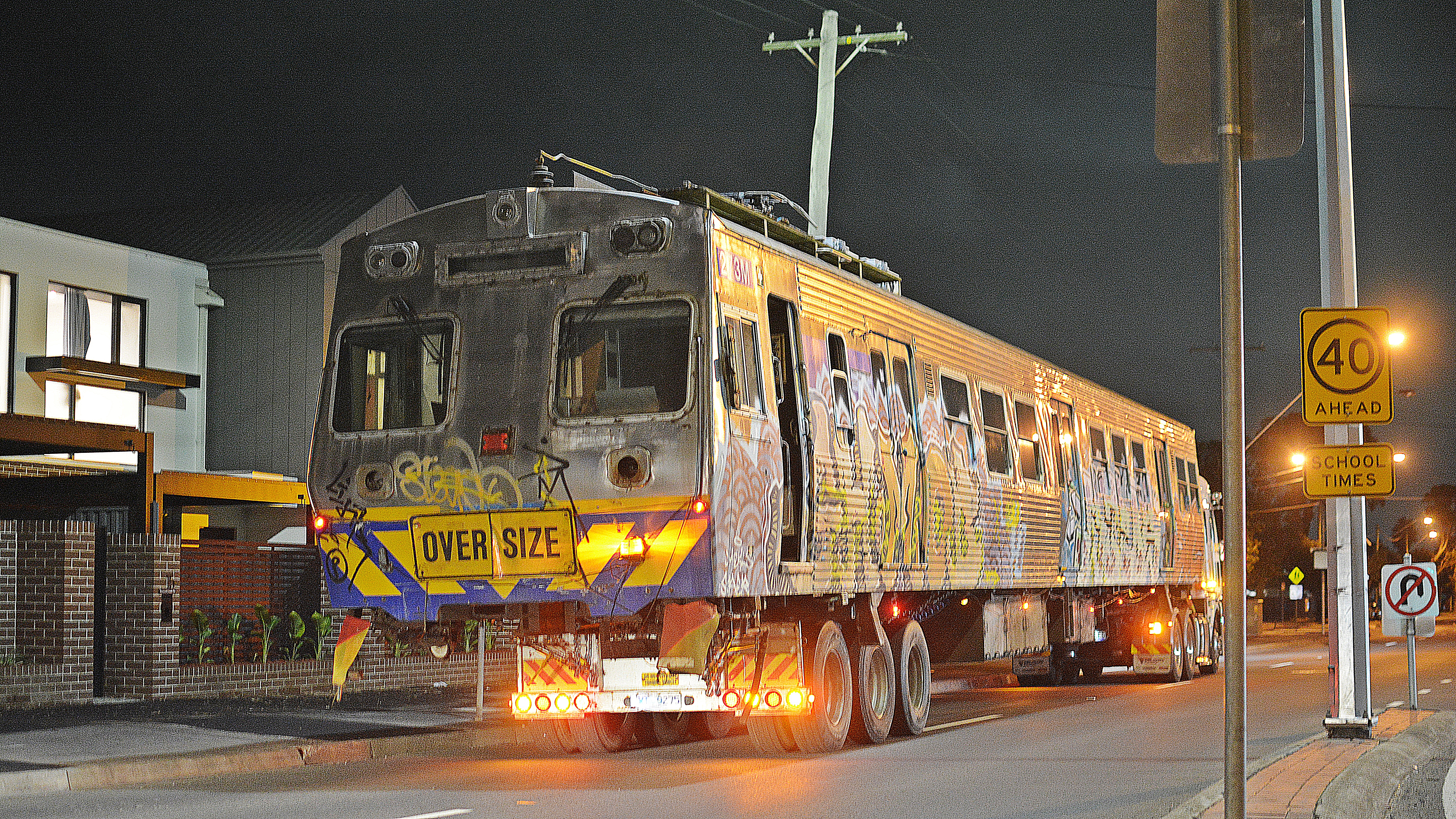
Hitachi 273M, loaded on a truck to Molong NSW

== Retirement ==
New X'Trapolis 100 and Siemens Nexas trains were progressively introduced from 2002 to replace the ageing Hitachi fleet. The X'Trapolis and Siemens trains have features such as push-button-operated doors and air conditioning, the lack of the latter feature making the Hitachis unpopular with passengers. A majority of the sets were withdrawn between 2002 and 2005, and were either scrapped, sold to private buyers across Australia, stored, or acquired by railway museums and preservation groups. Three Hitachi motor carriages were lifted and fixed to the roof of Easey's Restaurant in Collingwood, although only one carriage is part of the restaurant.

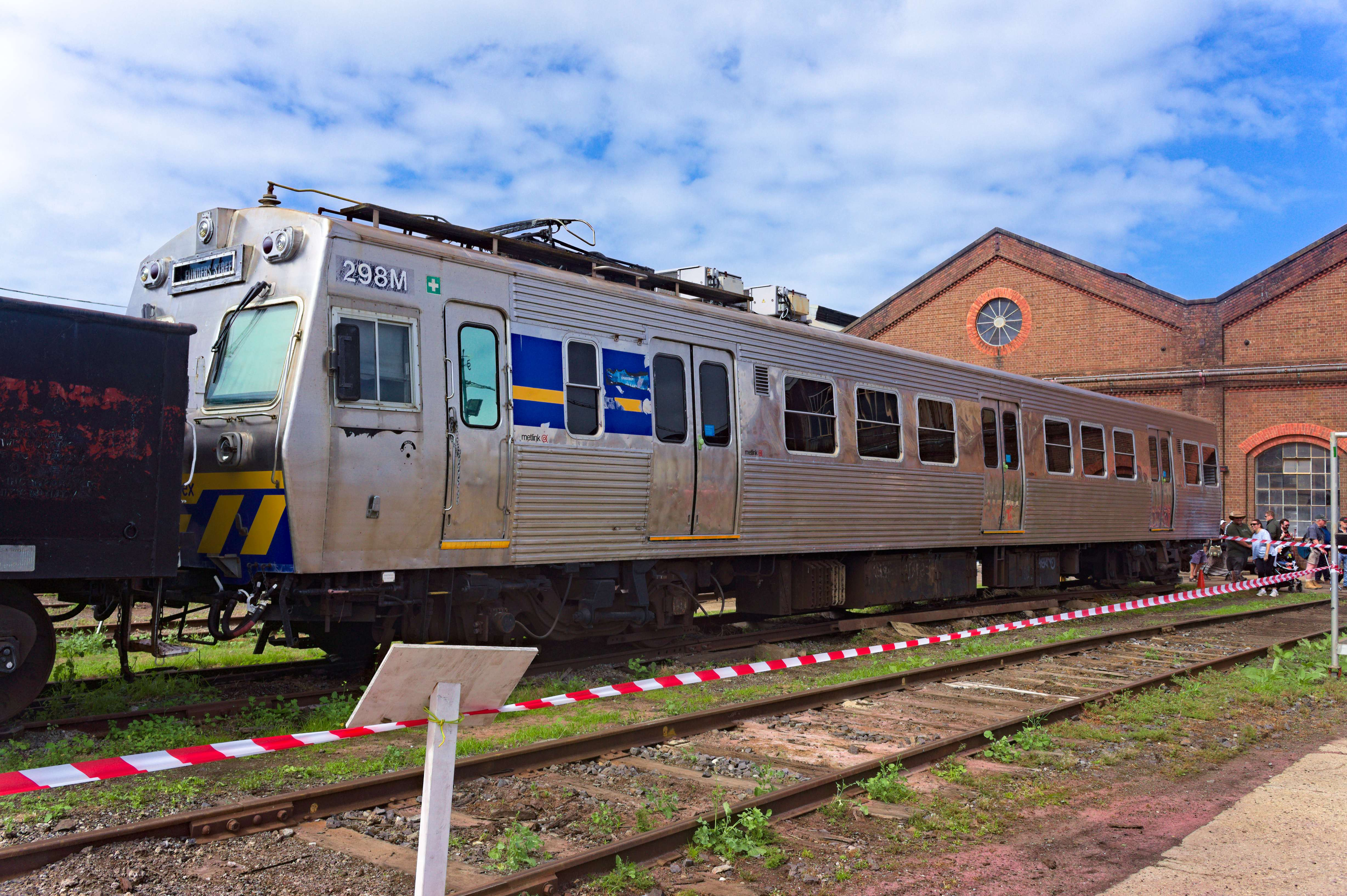
Hitachi 298M at Newport Workshops in March 2026

The final six 6-carriage trains were to be withdrawn after the 2006 Commonwealth Games, but instead received a minor refurbishment and remained in revenue service until December 2013, due to a significant increase in train patronage. In February 2007, at which time 31 trains in the new Siemens Nexas fleet were out of service due to braking problems, it was reported that the Victorian Government was negotiating to lease one withdrawn 6-carriage set from rail preservation group Elecrail, and repurchase another three carriages from a private seller to supplement the fleet. In April 2007, an additional three 3-car Hitachi trains were bought back from Australian businessman John Horne to provide spare parts for the fleet. The Elecrail set re-entered service in December 2007.

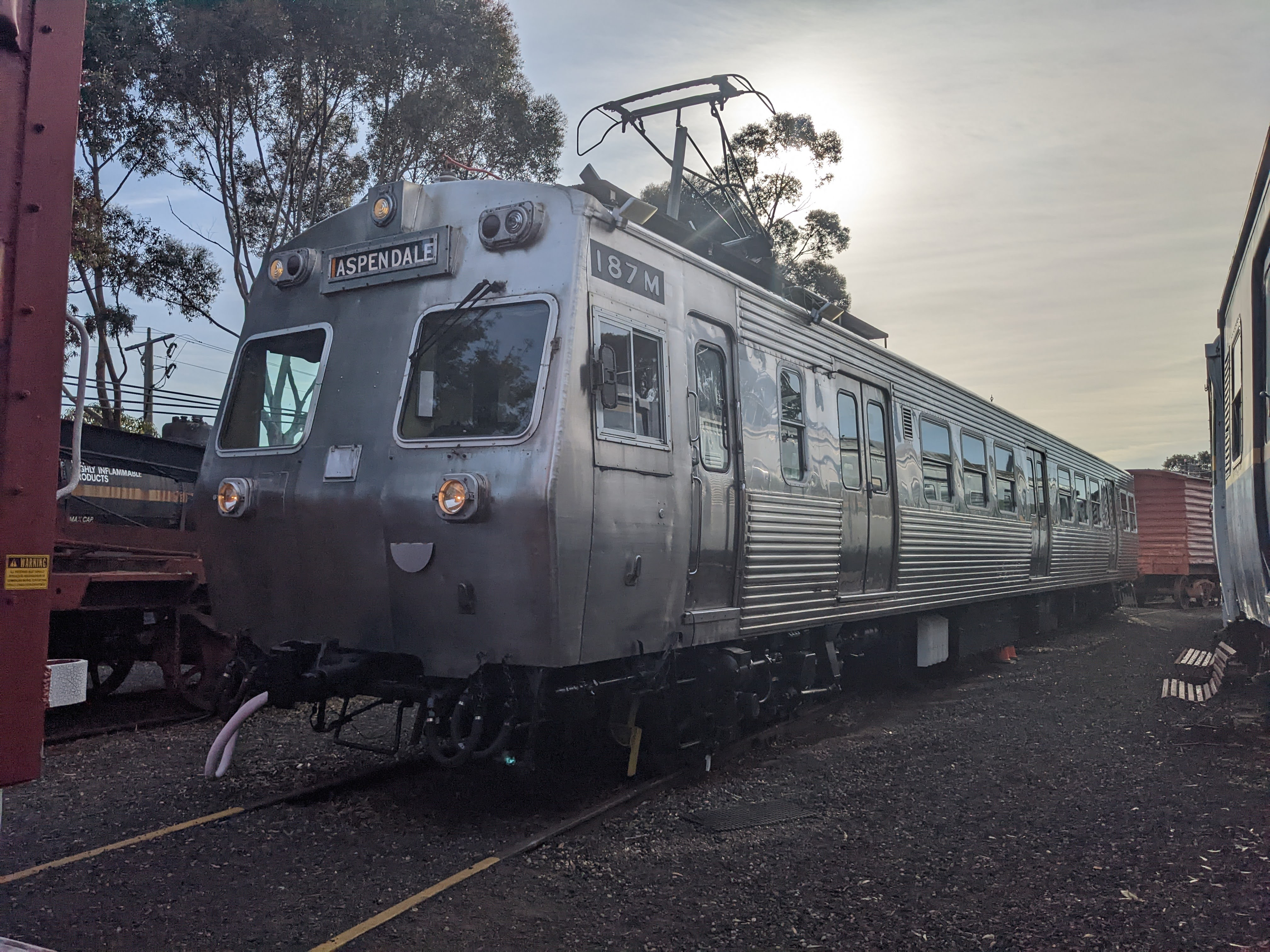
187M in its original unpainted livery preserved at the Newport Railway Museum

In September 2008, Transport Safety Victoria withdrew the remaining trains from service due to concerns over corrosion around the doors and floor. A series of tests were carried out before the trains were sent to Ballarat North Workshops for repair work. It was decided to proceed with the repairs, costing approximately $2 million, because the trains were required for a new timetable starting in November 2008.

In April 2014, a farewell tour for the Hitachi trains was held, organised by Elecrail in cooperation with Metro Trains. The tour encompassed the Craigieburn, South Morang and Sunbury lines. During the event, Public Transport Victoria confirmed that Hitachi trains would no longer be used in revenue service in Melbourne.

M car (187M), as modified by the PTC, is on static display at the Newport Railway Museum. One 3-car set (3M, 304D and 178M) has been preserved and is actively having works undertaken to restore it to a fully Operational standard by 707 Operations. M car (3M) has been preserved with its original unmodified cab, while M car (178M) has been preserved with a Connex refurbished cab. 1946T has been preserved in an Operational condition at the Mornington Tourist Railway. The remaining carriages were progressively sold to private owners or scrapped.
