= Martin & King =

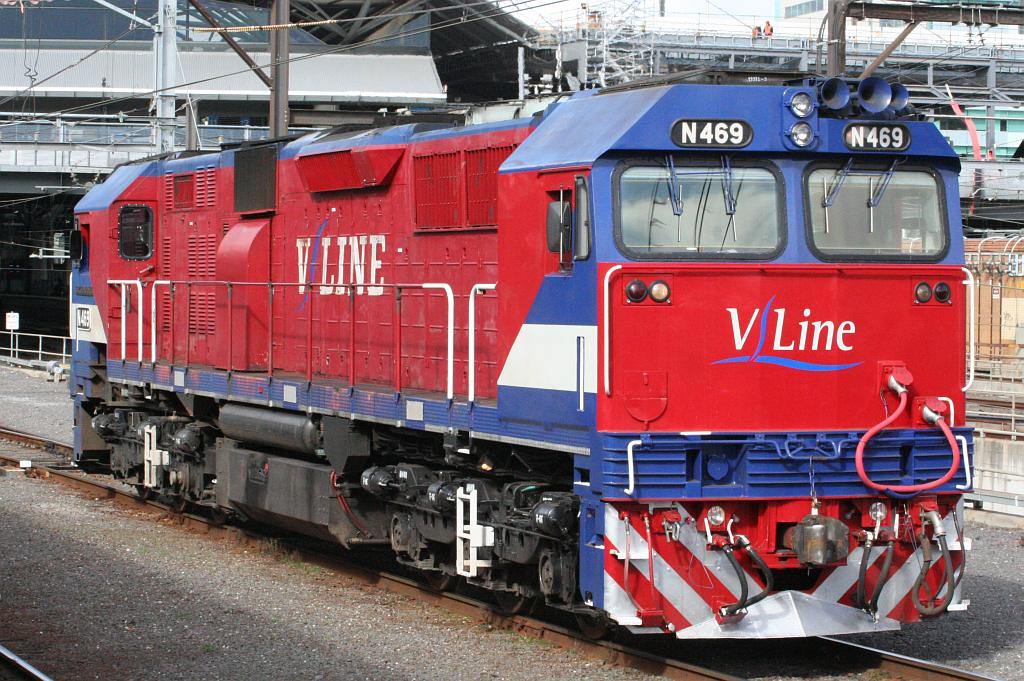
- V/Line N class locomotive at Southern Cross station, August 2006
- Industry: Motor body manufacturer Railway locomotive & rolling stock manufacturer
- Headquarters: Somerton
- Parent: Clyde Engineering

Martin & King was a manufacturing company based in Clayton, Victoria, Australia. The company originally specialised in making motor vehicle bodies and railway locomotives and rolling stock.

== History ==
The company was initially based in the Melbourne suburb of Armadale from at least 1948, later opening a plant to manufacture railway rolling stock at Clayton in the 1950s. In 1959, a new plant was opened at Somerton, which was provided with its own railway siding. Clyde Engineering acquired a controlling interest in the company in 1954. The Somerton plant is today occupied by Downer Rail.

== Products ==
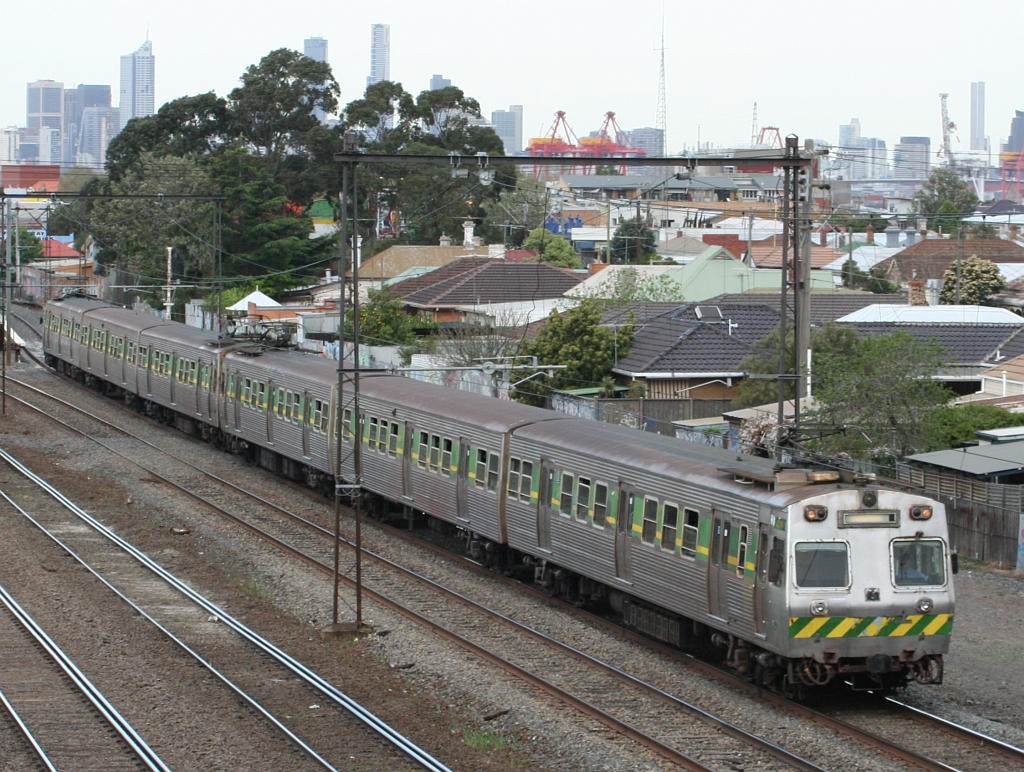
Hitachi suburban train in Middle Footscray, September 2006

- Bodywork for Buick cars (late 1930s)
- Body for the Reo Speed Tanker trucks (1937)
- Assembly of Jowett Javelins (1952)
- Assembly of Volkswagen Beetles (1954)
- Ford 103E utility (1955)
- Melbourne's Harris suburban trains ('T' car bodies) (1950s)
- Victorian Railways 102hp Walker railmotors (1948)
- Victorian Railways 153hp Walker railmotors (1948)
- Victorian Railways 280hp Walker railmotors (1950)
- Melbourne's Hitachi suburban trains (fitting out of 'M' and 'D' cars) (1970s)
- V/Line N class diesel locomotives (1985)
- V/Line P class diesel locomotive rebuilds (from flat top T classes) (1980s)
