= AEC railmotor =

Victorian railcar

A.E.C. railmotor
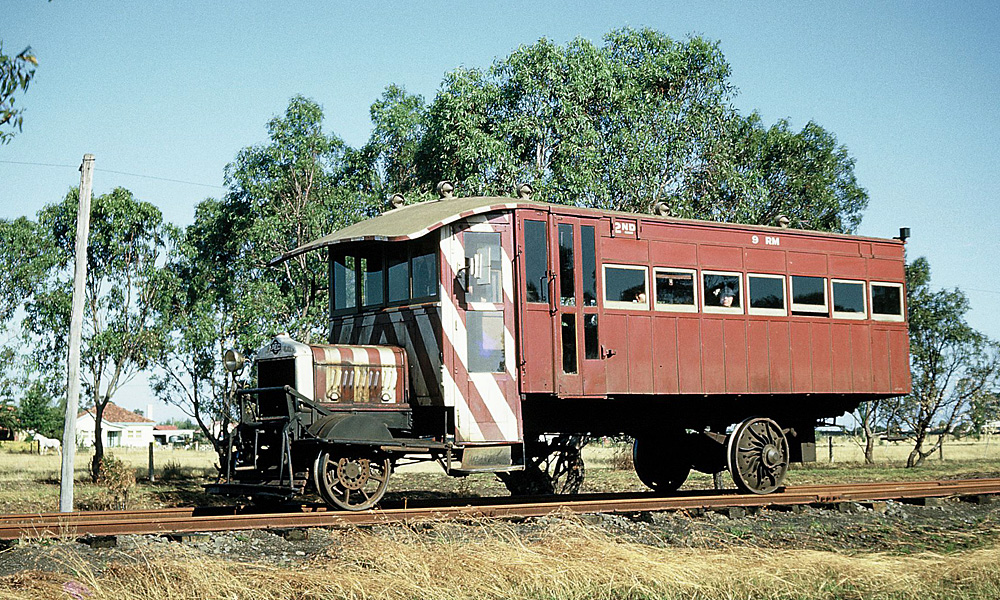
- AEC railmotor near Fawkner
- In service: 1922–1954
- Manufacturers: Associated Equipment Company (Chassis & Engine); Victorian Railways (Body)
- Designer: Victorian Railways
- Assembly: Victorian Railways
- Built at: Newport Workshops
- Constructed: 1922–1925
- Number built: 19
- Number scrapped: 19
- Design code: RM
- Fleet numbers: 1–19
- Capacity: 32 to 37 passengers

Specifications
- Prime mover: Petrol
- Engine type: Petrol engine
- Power output: 45 hp (34 kW)
- Track gauge: 5 ft 3 in (1,600 mm)

The AEC railmotor was the first successful railmotor built for the Victorian Railways. 19 vehicles were constructed from 1922 to 1925, along with 24 trailer vehicles built to a similar design.

== Design ==
Four different internal layouts were used, providing for different traffic.

Railmotor	First Class	Second Class	Railmotor	First Class	Second Class
AEC 1	0	37	AEC 10	32	0
AEC 2	0	37	AEC 11	32	0
AEC 3	0	37	AEC 12	0	37
AEC 4	0	37	AEC 13	0	37
AEC 5	0	37	AEC 14	10	22
AEC 6	0	37	AEC 15	32	0
AEC 7	10	22	AEC 16	32	0
AEC 8	32	0	AEC 17	32	0
AEC 9	11	21	AEC 18	10	22
			AEC 19	32	0

== Construction ==
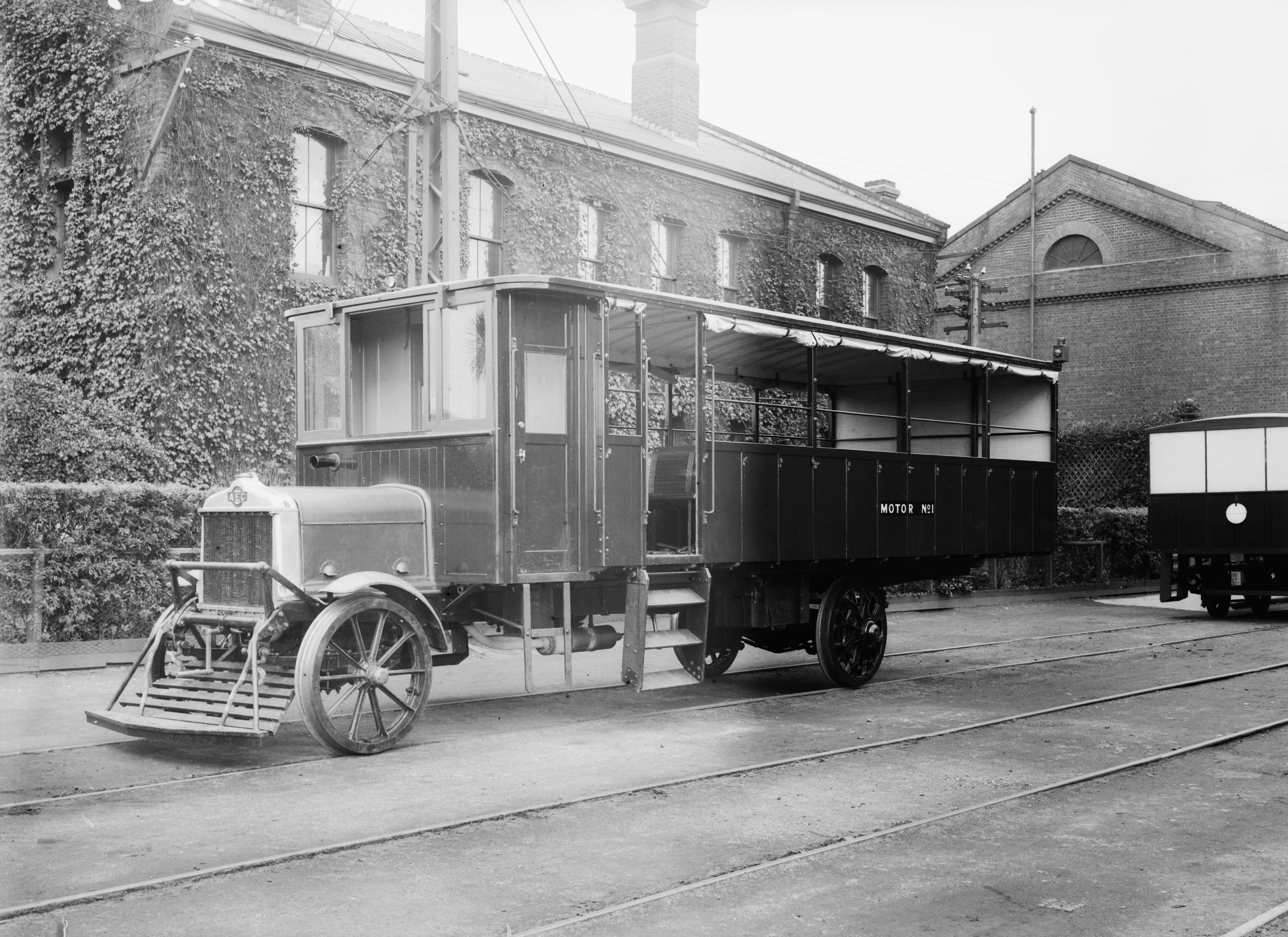
First AEC railmotor, photographed at Newport Railway Workshops

Over the first four months of 1922, a new type of train was constructed at Newport Workshops for the purpose of providing a local service to the Mildura region. Tenders had been invited for a motor chassis designed for a 5-ton lorry road service, but without the steering gear, tyres, front wheels and stub axles, for conversion to the first of the new type of what is now called a rail motor. The successful tenderer was the Associated Equipment Company, who provided the chassis with a four-cylinder petrol engine generating 45 hp (34 kW) at 1000rpm. Conveniently, the motorised axle was already suited for fitting railway wheels at the 5'3" gauge. The worm drive had been designed for a maximum speed of 17 miles per hour, so the gear ratio was changed from 8.25:1 to 4.5:1 to increase the maximum speed to about 35 miles per hour.

The original vehicle frame, measured between the front of the driver's seat and the end, was 14'9". The chassis frame members were cut at roughly the midpoint, with 4 feet spliced in, and a further 2'10" added to the end. The shaft from the gearbox to the universal joint powering the rear axles, and the brake rods to the rear axle, were also extended by four feet. The leading axle used 30 inch diameter wheels with waste-lubricated axle boxes. The overall wheelbase was 18 ft 2 3/8"in, and the railway wheels were attached by heating, fitting and allowing them to shrink to a tight fit on the axles, then using studs to secure them. The leading wheels did not have brakes fitted. The motor car was not capable of reversing except at very low speeds, so special turntables were necessary at each end of the sections where it would operate.

Standard railway equipment added to the design included a cowcatcher, horn and exhaust whistle, speedometer, electric lighting generator and battery, and a spring on the throttle control to shut off petrol if the driver ever let go; the latter is a very early form of dead-man's switch.

The body was built at 22'7" long, 9' wide and 6'7" internal clearance, with seating of maple battens on angle irons for 43 passengers. Two Oregon stringers, 4" x 4" cross-section, were carried directly on the chassis frame channels, with transverse bearers at 1' 8 7/8" centres. The sides were open, with canvas blinds provided in lieu of windows both to minimise weight and allow for use in hot climates. In addition to the electric headlights, the driver had his own internal light, and four more were provided in the passenger compartment.

Passengers would enter at the front and pass the driver, who would collect fares; a ticket box was placed behind the driver's seat, with a booking window provided as well. When the railmotor was stopped at level crossings and other locations without platforms, the driver could use a lever to lower steps down to ground level; this was interlocked to only permit the clutch to operate when the steps were retracted to within the loading gauge. Similarly, the doors were released by the driver.

A matching trailer, 1MT, was constructed at the same time to provide capacity for additional passengers and any luggage. This vehicle had a body 16' 2 1/2" long, with a 12-passenger compartment plus the parcels and brake equipment area. When the trailer was in use a Guard was provided, and they were responsible for the collection of fares. The Guard also had to be competent to relieve the Driver in case of emergency. An electrical plug was provided between the motor and trailer units to power lighting in the trailer, as well as permitting bell signal communication between the two employees.

The motor car when empty weighed 6.2 tons, and the trailer 4.25 tons. When fully-loaded, the combined car and trailer could achieve 10 miles per hour up a 1 in 50 grade, or 30 miles per hour on a level section of track. A trial run was made to Ferntree Gully on 21 April 1922, and another to Lancefield on 1 June 1922. The Minister for Railways, who had been a passenger on the latter trial, had noted the motor performed well even on the steeper 1:50 grades, whereas the Mildura line would have none steeper than 1:110.

Following a successful six months of operation on the Mildura suburban service, six more motor cars were constructed along with seven trailers (including a replacement for the original). These cars had windows along the sides, upholstered seats, an altered roof profile, and a new design for the guards over the front wheels. In May 1923 Motor No.1 returned to Newport for overhaul and conversion to the new design, being replaced by Motor No.2, starting service on 18 May 1923.

== In service ==
=== Mildura, Merbein and Red Cliffs (1922-1928) ===
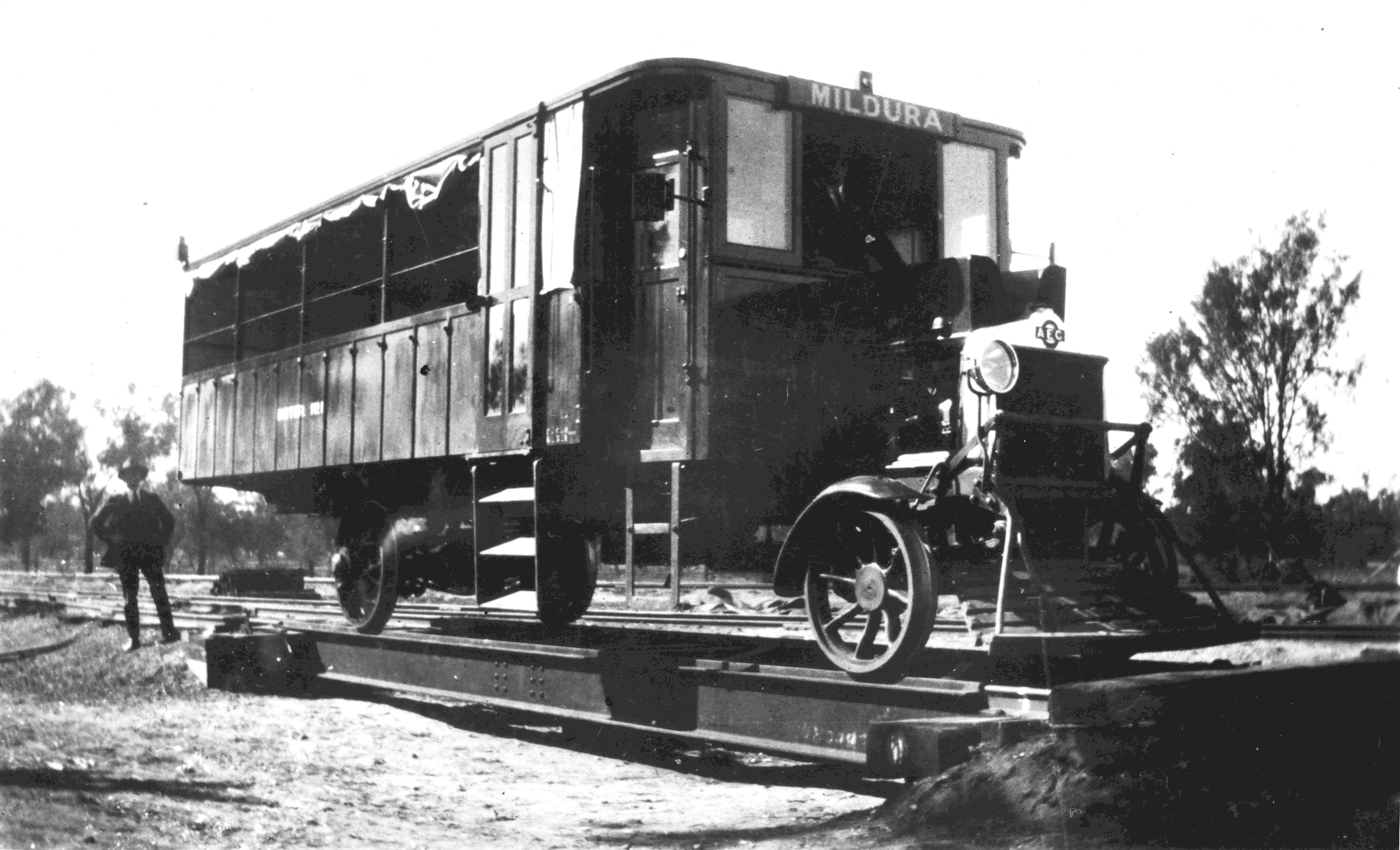
Mildura AEC rail car

Motor No.1 and Trailer MT1 entered service on the Mildura, Merbein and Red Cliffs lines on 26 June 1922. Light-weight turntables were provided at Merbein and Red Cliffs, special tickets were printed, and Red Cliffs was opened as a Train Staff and Ticket location on 25 April 1922. On 20 June 1922, Motor No.1 departed Newport Workshops, with overnight stops at Maryborough and Woomelang before arriving Mildura at 4:45pm. Both the driver and guard on that trip were permanently transferred to Mildura as the crew for the new service. Local trials were then conducted on 23 and 24 June, and local services began on Monday 26 June 1922.

The initial timetable was considered experimental, with intermediate stops in Mildura at 14th Street and at River Road, Merbein. (These were the first two Rail Motor Stopping Places in Victoria, though numbering of such stops was a later affair.) The initial timetable is provided below, though the 8:35am Monday service to Red Cliffs and return 9:10am was added on 2 July 1922, a week after the service had begun:

Day	Railmotor services					Steam services		
Mildura to Merbein
Monday	5:50am	7:20am			4:07pm	1:45pm		
Tuesday		7:20am			4:07pm	1:45pm		
Wednesday	5:50am	7:20am		9:00am	4:07pm	1:45pm		
Thursday		7:20am			4:07pm	1:45pm		
Friday		7:20am			4:07pm	1:45pm		
Saturday	5:50am	7:20am				9:05am	1:00pm	6:30pm
Merbein to Mildura
Monday	6:35am	8:05am		4:50pm		3:30pm		
Tuesday		8:05am		4:50pm		3:30pm		
Wednesday	6:35am	8:05am		4:50pm		3:30pm		
Thursday		8:05am		4:50pm		3:30pm		
Friday		8:05am		4:50pm		3:30pm		
Saturday	6:35am	8:05am		4:50pm		10:05am	1:30pm	7:05pm
Mildura to Red Cliffs
Monday	8:35am	1:00pm		5:23pm		7:30am		
Tuesday		1:00pm		5:23pm		7:30am		
Wednesday		1:00pm		5:23pm	6:00pm	7:30am		
Thursday		1:00pm		5:23pm		7:30am		
Friday		1:00pm		5:23pm		7:30am		
Saturday			1:20pm	5:23pm		7:30am	2:05pm	10:30pm
Red Cliffs to Mildura
Monday	9:10am	1:45pm			6:06pm	8:15am		
Tuesday		1:45pm			6:06pm	8:15am		
Wednesday		1:45pm			6:06pm	8:15am		
Thursday		1:45pm			6:06pm	8:15am		
Friday		1:45pm			6:06pm	8:15am		
Saturday			2:00pm	6:00pm		8:15am	5:40pm	11:10pm
Sunday						8:15am		

Fares on the new service ranged from 1 to 2 shillings; these were higher rates than the same on steam-hauled trips, which used the normal distance based formula. During the final trip on the fourth day of service, the alloy-steel driving shaft broke on the approach to Mildura and a replacement had to be provided from Newport Workshops. In the meantime, the service was maintained with steam haulage.

In August 1922 the Mildura local service was extended to Yatpool on Saturdays with an additional steam train, as no turning facility had been provided for the rail motor there. A new trailer, with twice the capacity, was also provided by the end of the year. Following the success of the service, six additional railmotors to an improved design were ordered, and additional trips were added in August along with three more stopping places, at Cowra Avenue, McCracken's Crossing, and an unnamed crossing at 344 1/2 miles between Irymple and Red Cliffs. However, from 30 October 1922 the Thursday afternoon service from Mildura to Merbein and return was cancelled, and passengers were no longer permitted to travel in the guard's van of the 5:45pm goods from Mildura to Ouyen. The summer schedule was introduced from 11 December 1922, with 20 return Merbein and 13 return Red Cliffs railmotor services per week, in addition to the steam services. By the end of the year, 100 additional passengers per day were being carried. In February 1923 a fifth Stopping Place was added, where the railway intersected with Eighth Street and San Mateo Avenue in Mildura. Following a deputation to the Railway Commissioners in April 1923 the fare structure of the railmotor trips was brought in line with the steam trips, though separate tickets continued to be issued to track patronage on each mode. Steam trains were permitted to stop for passengers at the Railmotor Stopping Place at 344 1/2 miles from July 1923, contingent on them only using the provided "Mallee-style" carriage which had low level steps. This location was named Sunnycliffs from 1 September 1924.

Railway Refreshment Rooms were opened at Ouyen and Birchip leading to another timetable change in August 1923, which then saw 19 weekly return railmotor services to Merbein, and 12 weekly return railmotor services to Red Cliffs, in addition to the steam service (7 and 10 respectively). In March 1924 the Saturday afternoon and evening railmotors to Merbein was replaced with a steam-hauled service. A new Red Cliffs returm railmotor service was provided on Friday night from 26 September 1924, and another Friday evening trip to Merbein was introduced from 3 October. Two more stopping places were provided on the Red Cliffs line around the end of 1924, at Koorlong Avenue and at Ginquam Avenue, and another in March 1925 at the 343 1/2 mile post. Many of the Stopping Places were also provided with lamps, and the River Road stop had a shelter provided. Later the same year two more Stopping Places opened, at The Ridge between 14th street and River Road, and at Morpung Avenue between Irymple and Ginquam Avenue, for a total of eleven stops between Merbein and Red Cliffs.

In 1925, AEC Railmotor No.2, still rostered on the Mildura line, was modified with a standard way-bill clip installed above the speedometer in the driver's cabin as a place to store Train Staff Tickets, which drivers had previously kept in their pocket; this had caused delays when surrendering the ticket for cancellation to permit the following train to operate over the same section. Ironically, by the time the clip had been fitted, the relevant safe working system was just about due for replacement with Electric Staff, which did not use paper tickets as train authorities; and these clips were not sighted fitted to any of the other railmotors which may have had use for them.

This was around the time that road buses had been introduced in competition with the local rail service, and lower patronage meant the trailer was "rarely seen". Merbein residents at the time were critical of the Government for issuing tickets Melbourne to Merbein on the Saturday evening train, which terminated at Mildura Sunday morning without a connecting railmotor service being provided; this was used as an example of a road bus collecting passengers who otherwise would have used the train.

From 27 June 1925, a two-month trial saw an additional 9am service from Mildura to Red Cliffs and return on Tuesdays to Saturdays, and an additional Saturday mid morning service to Merbein. On 24 August 1925, Motor and Trailer 2 were replaced with set 18. In late October 1925 the afternoon Red Cliffs return trip was cancelled following the end of football season. From 14 November the Saturday night Merbein service was moved to earlier in the evening, and from 8 December the Monday to Friday night Red Cliffs service was shifted to late afternoon.

By the end of 1926 patronage had fallen significantly, with tickets from Mildura to Merbein down fro, 609 in 1925 to 457 in 1926, to Red Cliffs from 575 to 291, and to Irymple from 370 to only 66 rail passengers. This was attributed to the improved roads and therefore improved bus service, which was also able to serve other towns not along the rail corridor such as Cardross, Birdwoodton and Merbein South.

From 6 March 1927 a Sunday morning railmotor to Merbein was provided, connecting with the Saturday night train from Melbourne. On 12 March 1927, the railmotor ordinarily used on the Ouyen to Murrayville and Pinnaroo line was extended to Mildura as an experimental service for shopping trips, and this was permanently added to the weekly timetable from 15 October the same year. Fares were also cut by about a third at this time, and return tickets were issued for more destinations in lieu of pairs of single tickets; these return tickets could be used across multiple days. From 21 March 1927 the railmotor service was 23 weekly Merbein trips (including Sunday morning) and 57 weekly Red Hills trips, plus steam services. With such a high frequency, up to three AEC railmotors could be seen in Mildura, four times per day between 4pm and 7:45pm before the Ouyen railmotor departed. From 9 May the Merbein evening and late night services on Mondays and Wednesdays were shifted about half an hour earlier. Fares were further reduced from 25 June, but the Sunday morning Merbein service was cancelled from 2 October, and the Monday and Wednesday evening and night services were deleted from 31 October.

From 27 February 1928 the service was significantly curtailed, one of the railmotors and two crew members transferred elsewhere. At this time the weekly railmotor service was 17 Merbein and 18 Red Cliffs return trips. The service was finally shut down from 10 November 1928, with that motor repaired in Melbourne then redeployed for a Maryborough service. The extended Ouyen Shopper service persisted until 30 September 1930. From December 1928, a replacement service was provided with a 12 hp rail trolley, fitted with a light roof, for transport of light, perishable goods between Mildura and Merbein, which remained until 4 July 1967.

=== Other services ===
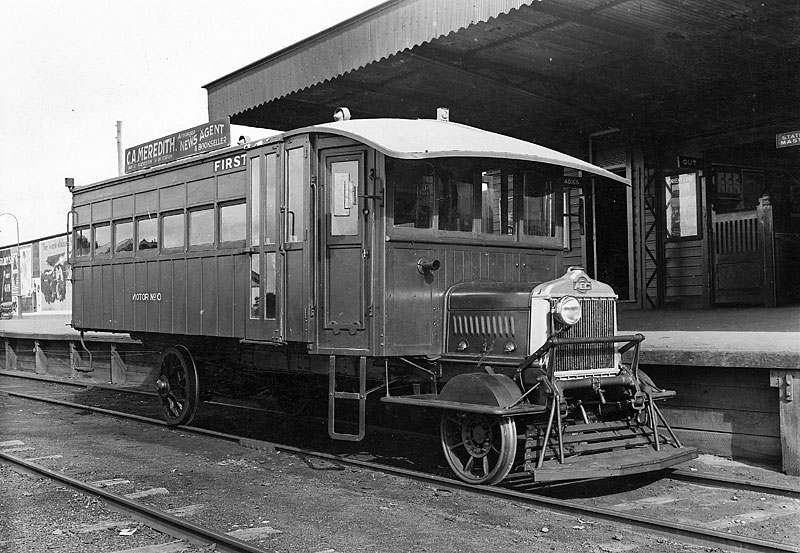
10 RM At Mornington

- AEC railmotors were used on the Reservoir – Whittlesea shuttle service from 1924 until 1931.
- On the Outer Circle line, a pair of AEC railmotors coupled back to back operated the Deepdene Dasher service from Riversdale to Deepdene from 15 August 1926 until 10 October 1927, after which the service was replaced by buses.
- A single AEC railmotor operated a shuttle service on the Upfield line, between Fawkner and Somerton (just south of the site of the current Roxburgh Park station), from 1928 until 1956. A turntable for the railmotor was installed at Fawkner and Somerton.

== Withdrawal & preservation ==
The AECs were progressively withdrawn in the early 1950s as the new Walker railmotors came into service.

None survive into preservation.

== See also ==
- Victorian Railways
- Associated Equipment Company
