= Victorian Railways M class =

Class of Australian 4-4-0T locomotives

Type and origin
- Power type: Steam
- Builder: Beyer Peacock, Phoenix Foundry
- Serial number: 40, 210-240, 312-320 (Even only)
- Total produced: 22
Specifications
- Configuration
  - Whyte: 4-4-0T
- Gauge: 1,600 mm (5 ft 3 in)
Career
- Operators: Victorian Railways

The Victorian Railways M class were 4-4-0T (tank) steam locomotives for suburban passenger service in Melbourne, a pattern engine being supplied in 1879 by Beyer, Peacock & Company. Twenty-one further locomotives of this model were built by the Phoenix Foundry of Ballarat, in three batches, from 1884 to 1886. They were numbered 40 (pattern engine), 210-240 (even numbers only), and 312-320 (evens only), and were classed M in 1886.

Because their relatively small coal bunker proved inadequate for the rapidly expanding suburban network of the 1880s, they were rebuilt between 1901 and 1905 at the Newport Workshops as 4-4-2T locomotives. They were given an enlarged bunker of 3.05 tonnes (3.00 long tons; 3.36 short tons) capacity on extended frames supported by a trailing radial axle, and the cylinder diameter was increased from 17 to 18 inches (430 to 460 mm). At the same time, the opportunity was taken to replace the troublesome leading Bissell truck with one of the design being used successfully on the contemporary A class and D class locomotives. The rebuilt locomotives were regarded as equivalent to the Victorian Railways' ubiquitous E class 2-4-2T suburban engines for rostering purposes, and were known as the M^{E} class, although the original 'M' class plates carried on the locomotives were not altered.

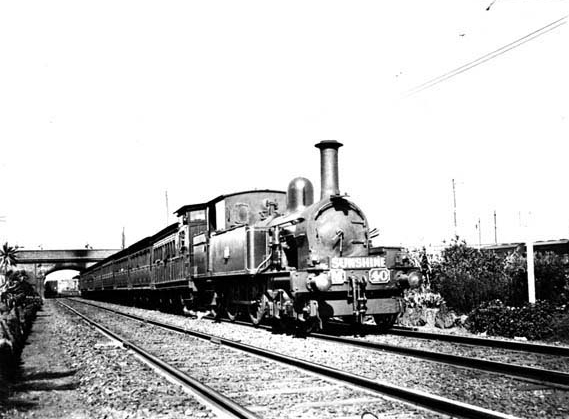
No.40 departing North Melbourne

The re-built engines proved very successful in service, and withdrawals did not commence until 1913, following the introduction of the larger D^{DE} (later D^{4}) class suburban tank engines from 1908. The last M^{E} locomotives were scrapped in 1922, having been rendered surplus by the conversion of suburban lines to electric traction from 1919 onwards. None have been preserved.
