= Phoenix Foundry =

Former Australian manufacturing company

The Phoenix Foundry was a company that built steam locomotives and other industrial machinery in the city of Ballarat, Victoria, Australia. Over 30 years they built 352 locomotives for the Victorian Railways, of 38 different designs.

== History ==
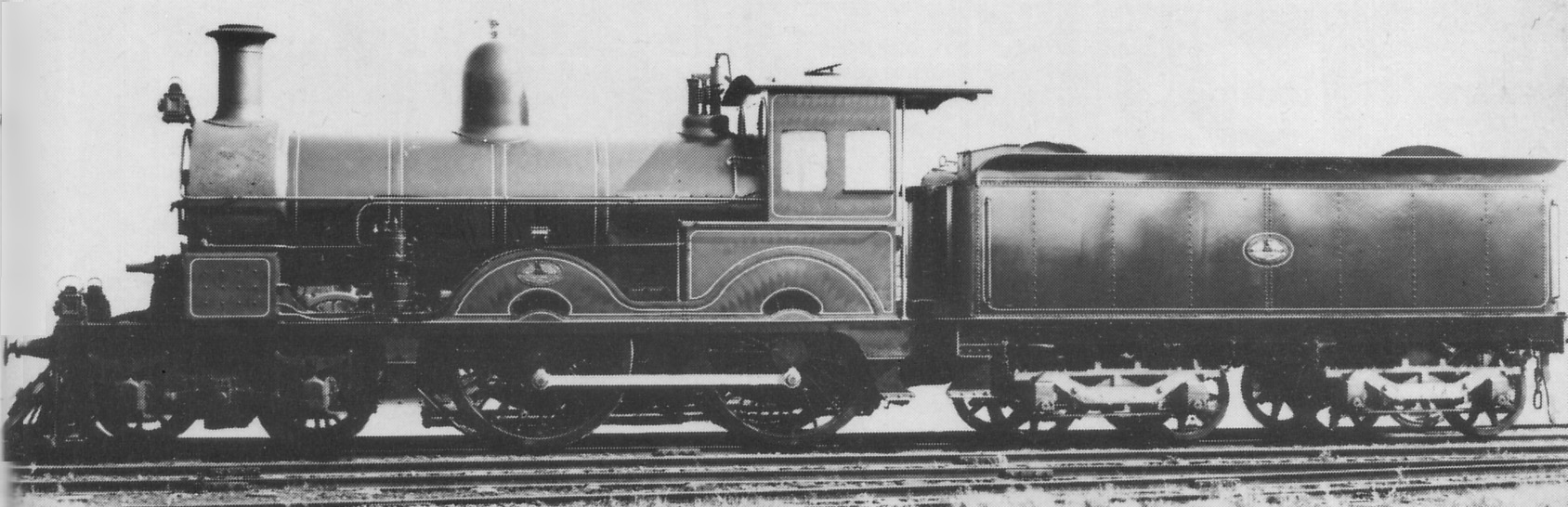
AA class locomotive of 1900

The Phoenix Foundry was established in 1854 to build mining machinery and was incorporated as the Phoenix Foundry Co. Ltd. in 1870.

The company was established by iron-founder William Shaw, moulder Robert Holden, and engine-smiths Richard Carter and George Threlfall. The business prospered, and by November 1861 it employed 96 men, producing a wide range of products. From around 1858 the employees were working an eight-hour day while doing as much work as English workers did in ten hours. In 1871 Phoenix completed the locomotive named Governor Weld which was the first steam locomotive to operate in Western Australia. Also in August 1871 the foundry successfully tendered for the first Victorian Government railway locomotive contracts, with the first locomotive being delivered on 27 February 1873, and by 1884 over 350 men were employed. Modernisation of the works was carried out after Shaw visited Britain in 1871 and 1885, with the workshops becoming the most advanced in the Southern Hemisphere. The hundredth locomotive was completed in April 1883 and the two hundredth by October 1887. The majority of locomotives built were duplicates of imported 'pattern engines' designed and built overseas by other companies.

Problems arose in 1889 when Shaw attempted to enforce a non-union shop, which resulted in conflict with the employees. Further trouble arose regarding the foundry's relationships with the Victorian Railways (VR), with a tender war erupting between Phoenix and the VR Newport Workshops for the construction of Dd class 4-6-0 light-line locomotives. A Royal Commission was appointed in October 1904 to resolve the question of the 'real costs' of production. The Commission found in favour of Newport, which could produce a locomotive for £3,364 - some £497 cheaper than Phoenix's cost, and noted that Phoenix was making a 23 percent profit on each locomotive. Phoenix received no further orders from the VR beyond the seven members of the Dd class which were delivered in 1904. The works lasted another year until the directors entered voluntary liquidation.

== Locomotives ==
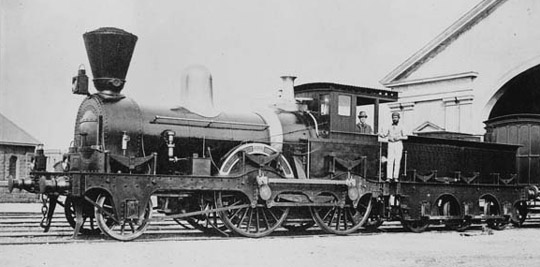
B class with original spark-arresting funnel

Locomotives built by the Phoenix Foundry for the Victorian Railways included:

- O class 0-6-0 goods: 131 to 143 (odd numbers). Built 1878–1879. Last one scrapped in 1922.
- B class 2-4-0 passenger 186 and 188. Built 1880–81. Scrapped in 1914 and 1911 respectively.
- F class 2-4-0 passenger 126 to 144 (even numbers) and 166 to 184 (even numbers). Built 1876–1879. Last one scrapped in 1925.
- Q class 0-6-0 goods: 83 to 101 (odd numbers). Built 1873, first locomotives by Phoenix. Last one sold in 1908.
- U class 0-6-0 goods: 107 to 123 (odd numbers). Built 1874. Last one scrapped in 1908.
- T class 0-6-0 goods: 249 to 283 (odd numbers). Built 1884.
- '1st' K class 2-4-0 passenger 114 to 124 (even numbers). Built 1874. Last one scrapped in 1905.
- '1st' H class 4-4-0 passenger 146 to 160 (even numbers). Built 1877. Last one scrapped in 1916.
- M class 4-4-0 tank passenger 210 to 240 (even numbers) and 312 to 320 (even numbers). Built 1884–86. Last one scrapped in 1922.
- 'Old' R class 0-6-0 goods: 157 to 195 (odd numbers). Built 1881–86. Last one scrapped in 1944.
- '1st' C class 4-4-0 well tank passenger 42, 262 to 276 (even numbers) and 306 to 310 (even numbers). Built 1882–83. Last one scrapped in 1916.
- '1st' S class 4-6-0 goods: 197 to 215 (odd numbers). Built 1883. Last one rebuilt to W class in 1908.
- D class 4-4-0 passenger: 82, 92, 122, 242, 244, 248, 250, 260, 322 to 344 (even numbers). Built 1887–88. Last one scrapped in 1928.
- '1st' X class 0-6-0 goods: 353 to 381 (odd numbers). Built 1886–87. Last one scrapped in 1920.
- E class 2-4-2 tank suburban passenger: 346 to 394 (even numbers). Built 1889–90. Last one scrapped in 1920.
- E class 2-4-2 tank suburban passenger: 12, 34, 36, 428 to 460 (even numbers). Built 1892–94.
- 'New' A class 4-4-0 passenger: 396 to 424 (even numbers). Built 1889–91. Last one scrapped in 1925.
- Y class 0-6-0 goods: 383 to 441 (odd numbers). Built 1889.
- Z class 2-4-0 tank passenger motor engine: 522 and 524. Built 1893, scrapped in 1910 and 1911.
- E class (3rd series) 0-6-2 tank goods: 462 to 470 (even numbers). Built 1893 as EE class, reclassed as E class (3rd series) in late 1920s.
- V class (2nd series) 2-8-0 goods: 501 to 529 (odd numbers). Built 1901–02, last scrapped in 1930.
- A^{A} class 4-4-0 passenger: 20 locomotives: 530 to 558, 562 to 570 (even numbers). Built 1900–03, last scrapped in 1940.
- D^{D} class 4-6-0: 7 locomotives, 602 to 610 (even numbers), 632, 634. Built 1904. Last one (Dd 634, renumbered D1 505) withdrawn in August 1941 and later scrapped.

== Engineering heritage award ==
The foundry received an Engineering Heritage Marker from Engineers Australia as part of its Engineering Heritage Recognition Program.

== See also ==
- James Martin (South Australian politician) had similarly named foundry in South Australia, similar competition from State government railway workshop.
