= AA class =

AA class may refer to:

- NZR AA class, 4-6-2 steam locomotives
- Victorian Railways AA class, 4-4-0 steam locomotives
