= Victorian Railways V class =

Class of Australian 2-8-0 steam locomotives

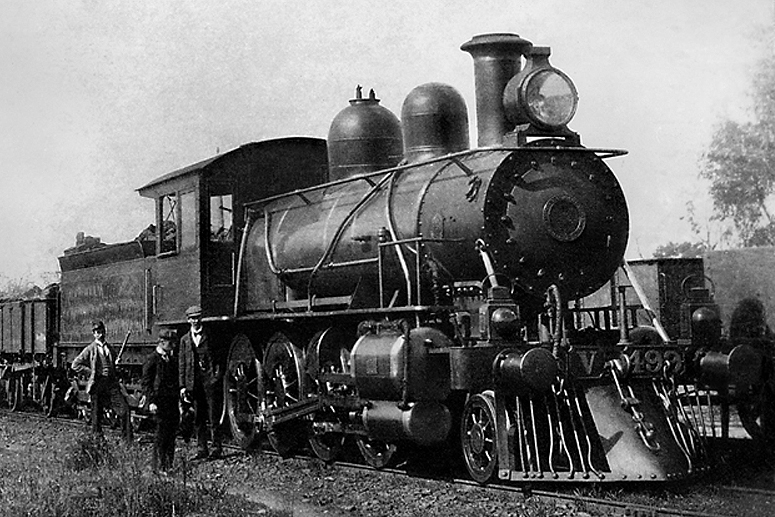
Type and origin
- Power type: Steam
- Builder: Baldwin USA, Phoenix Ballarat
- Serial number: 200-204, 206, 210-215, 509, 513, 515, 517
- Total produced: 16
Specifications
- Configuration
  - Whyte: 2-8-0
- Gauge: 1,600 mm (5 ft 3 in)
- Length: 14.78m
Career
- Operators: Victorian Railways

The Victorian Railways V Class is a steam locomotive, used on the Victorian Railways in the period 1900-1930.

== History and description ==
In 1899, the Victorian Railways (VR) imported from the Baldwin Locomotive Works, Philadelphia, USA, a pattern locomotive for a new design of all-lines heavy goods engine. It was the largest that the VR system had operated up to then, and was typically American in design. It had a 2-8-0 ("Consolidation") wheel arrangement, with four cylinders arranged according to the Vauclain compound system of propulsion.

The maker's number was 17396 and the pattern locomotive entered service on 30 May 1900 as V Class number 499. Test runs were made with coal trains between Melbourne and Nyora in South Gippsland, where the locomotive quickly demonstrated its worth. It also made a test run to Upper Ferntree Gully, where damage was caused to the cleaning and lagging of the low-pressure cylinder, due to it striking the platform, which in those days had an inside curve.

Resulting from the success of those tests, tenders were called for the provision of another 14 consolidation locomotives. Eight were to be built as simple expansion engines and the remaining six were to use the compound system. Offers were received from Baldwin, and two local firms, the Phoenix Foundry Co. Ltd. and Robinson Bros. & Co. Ltd. After much deliberation and negotiation, the Phoenix Foundry was awarded the contract to build an additional 15 V class 2-8-0s, with all to be built as Vauclain compounds. The 15 locomotives were delivered in monthly intervals between late 1901 and the end of 1902. They were given the road numbers 501 to 529 (odds only) and carried the Phoenix builder’s numbers 325 to 339.

The adoption of the 2-8-0 wheel arrangement was a dramatic departure from the standard 0-6-0 goods type, very commonly used up to that time. With an engine weight of over 50 long tons (56 short tons; 51 t), the V class was 30% heavier than the then-largest goods locomotive, the Victorian Railways Y class 0-6-0, yet an axle load of 12 long tons 12 cwt (28,200 lb or 12.8 t) allowed the V class to travel on all lines around Victoria.

The V class was soon to be seen on many parts of the VR system, although the heavily-graded South Gippsland line seemed to be a favourite stamping ground, as were the lines radiating from Maryborough and Bendigo. The locomotives were also employed on excursion trains to the hills east of Melbourne during the holiday periods, and Upper Ferntree Gully would always have a fair number of the class running there. They were also seen in the Yarra Valley.

The locomotives were of American design and construction methods, with bar frames, overhead equalised springing and very spacious steel cabs. They had an elegant look, brought about by the flared copper-top chimney and large brass steam dome cover. When built, they were painted in the then-standard VR green livery and were kept in immaculate condition, in accordance with standards of the era. During the early 20th century they were painted in Canadian Pacific Red, and then, in the 1920s, the entire class received the standard livery adopted at that time – all-over black.

The boilers were a conventional type with round-topped firebox and a working pressure of 200 psi (1,379 kPa). The boiler barrel was 4 feet 8 inches (1,422 mm) in diameter, 13 feet (3.96 m) long between the tubeplates, and there were 198 brass boiler tubes, 2 inches (51 mm) in diameter. The smokebox extended well forward of the blast pipe and chimney, to provide space for a spark arrestor, and baffle plates that were the forerunners of the self-cleaning smokebox.

The driving position was on the right-hand side, with the valve gear controlled by a ‘Johnson Bar’ lever and ratchet system. The regulator was a typical American pull-out lever with notched sector plate and graduation. The regulator itself was of the balanced, conically-seated type which, in later years, became the standard for locomotives from the 2-8-2 X-class and onward. When new boilers were fitted to the class, the regulator was changed to the rotating shaft type, with a British-style double-ended lever.

With their wheel 2-8-0 arrangement, the V class were Victoria’s first eight-coupled locomotives, pre-dating the much larger C class 2-8-0s by some 18 years. The 2-foot-6-inch (762 mm) diameter leading wheels were arranged in a Bissel truck, the springs of which were compensated to the heading pair of driving wheels. The 4-foot-6-inch (1,372 mm) driving wheels were coupled to two outside 22-inch (559 mm) diameter and 26-inch (660 mm) stroke low-pressure cylinders, with two 13-inch (330 mm) diameter by 26-inch (660 mm) stroke high-pressure cylinders.

To get the locomotive moving, a hand-controlled high-pressure steam valve was provided, by means of which the driver could admit a proportion of high-pressure steam into the low-pressure cylinders. Although it was intended by its designers as a starting device only, the direct steam valve was consistently misused by drivers to help them over heavy grades, at the expense of operating efficiency and of their fireman. According to the Vauclian notes, the locomotives were to be driven on the reversing lever in such conditions, but that was clearly not a practice used by VR staff at the time. Due to the consequent high cost of maintenance, the entire class was rebuilt as simple expansion locomotives between 1912 and 1913.

With a total wheelbase of only 48 feet 6 inches (14.78 m) the V class could be turned on the 50-foot (15.24 m) turntables at many branch line termini. The total length over the buffers was 57 feet 7 inches (17.55 m), giving the impression that they could only just fit onto the turntable.

As the original boilers came to the end of their lives, new ones were built. However, they were fitted with a standard steam dome, and the safety valves and whistle were mounted over the firebox. The new dome covers were mild steel pressings and were identical with those of the A2 class. The new boilers were provided when each locomotive was converted to simple expansion operation, V513 and 515 being the last two to be converted.

The V class continued to operate until their boilers were condemned. V513 was the first to be scrapped, in June 1924, and, ironically, the last to be cut up was the class leader V499 (later V200). Most of the V class lasted until the 1923 renumbering and were given the consecutive numbers 200-215.

Even though the then VR Engineer-in-Chief, Thomas Higinbotham, had recognised as far back as 1875 that American-designed locomotives had many good features, they were not widely adopted by the VR. Improved front-end performance, bar frames, flexible suspensions and leading wheels to "steer" locomotives around curves, were only embraced many years after the introduction of the V-class American import.

== Replica build project ==
The Victorian Steam Locomotive Company, based in Maldon and associated with the Victorian Goldfields Railway, was undertaking a project to build a replica of the Vauclain compound V Class locomotives. The locomotive was to be numbered V499 after the class leader, but was intended to be a representation of the V class collectively, rather than a replica of this original Baldwin-built locomotive.

By the end of 2022, the project had ceased, for unknown reasons, and the various parts were distributed.
