= Victorian Railways X class (1886) =

Class of Australian 0-6-0 locomotives

Type and origin
- Power type: Steam
- Builder: Phoenix Foundry
- Serial number: 185-199
- Build date: 1886-1887
- Total produced: 15
Specifications
- Configuration
  - Whyte: 0-6-0
- Gauge: 5 ft 3 in (1,600 mm) Victorian broad gauge
- Driver dia.: 5 ft 0 in (1,520 mm)
- Wheelbase: 37 ft 4 1/2 in (11.392 m)
- Length: 48 ft 9 1/2 in (14.872 m)
- Height: 13 ft 5 3/4 in (4,108 mm)
- Axle load: 14 long tons 3 cwt (31,700 lb or 14.4 t)
- Loco weight: 41 long tons 14 cwt (93,400 lb or 42.4 t)
- Tender weight: 25 long tons 14 cwt (57,600 lb or 26.1 t)
- Total weight: 67 long tons 8 cwt (151,000 lb or 68.5 t)
- Fuel type: Coal
- Fuel capacity: 70 long cwt (7,800 lb or 3,600 kg)
- Water cap.: 2,220 imp gal (10,100 L; 2,670 US gal)
- Boiler pressure: Original: 140 psi (965 kPa) Reboilered 1900: 155 psi (1,069 kPa)
- Heating surface
  - Firebox: 103.76 sq ft (9.640 m^{2})
  - Tubes: 1,313.76 sq ft (122.052 m^{2})
  - Total surface: 1,416.96 sq ft (132 m^{2})
- Cylinders: 2
- Cylinder size: 18 in × 26 in (457 mm × 660 mm)
Performance figures
- Tractive effort: Original: 14,040 lbf (62.5 kN) at 100 psi Reboilered 1900: 17,410 lbf (77.4 kN) at 80% boiler pressure
Career
- Operators: Victorian Railways
- Numbers: X353-X381 (odd only)
- First run: 3 August 1886
- Last run: 19 November 1920 (34.3 years)
- Disposition: 15 scrapped

The Victorian Railways X class was a class of 0-6-0 mainline goods locomotives operated by the Victorian Railways between 1886 and 1920.

== History ==
First class using the new Victorian Railway letter classification system.

=== Production ===
Built by the Phoenix Foundry, Ballarat in 1886/87, these were large engines of the English tradition featuring a low footplate and a continuous coupling rod splasher similar to the 'Old' A class. They had a steel cab with cutaway side sheets and a small side window which remained unaltered during their life. The tenders also were similar to the 'Old' A's in design and capacity; a six wheel type with narrow tanks to make space above the footplate for the springs. They were painted in bright green and white outlines, with polished brass dome cover and copper chimney cap.

=== Regular service ===
Although they were classed as a main line goods engine, they were regularly assigned to extra and excursion passenger traffic, even working express rosters at times, including the Adelaide Express as far as Stawell and some Gippsland trains to Warragul. They also operated race and showgrounds traffic on the Flemington Racecourse line. In 1894, 13 were allocated to North Melbourne and two to Ballarat probably for working the Adelaide Express.

=== Design improvements ===
They were fitted with cow-catches and Westinghouse air-brakes in the 1890s.

Several were used in tests with water and coal economy devices:

- No. 353 was fitted with 'Alve's hot air apparatus' in 1893, which was fitted around the chimney. It had large air ducts to the ashpan to preheat the primary air supply to the firebox and thus aid combustion. This was a short-lived experiment of dubious benefit.
- Nos. 355 and 357 were fitted with Knorr's feed water heaters in 1894.
- No. 353 was fitted with Knorr's feed water heater and an Alve's hot water pump in August 1895.
- Nos. 355 and 379 had Adam's vortex blast pipes installed during 1889 and 1891 in an attempt to improve drafting and front-end efficiency.

Reboilering in 1900-03 raised the working pressure from 140 psi to 155 psi, and the cylinders were rebored to 18 1/2 inches in diameter in 1914-17 with an increase in tractive effort to 18390 pounds. In 1916 the working pressure was reduced to 145 psi, dropping the tractive effort to 17203 pounds.

=== Accidents ===
- 4 November 1886 - X359 damaged in accident.
- 11 January 1888 - X381 damaged in accident.
- 4 February 1888 - X365 ran away on Sunbury Bank.
- 14 January 1889 - X365 damaged in accident.
- 8 February 1889 - X355 damaged in accident.
- May 1889 - X373 damaged in accident.
- 18 October 1889 - X355 derailed and turned over embankment near Seymour.
- 24 February 1890 - X359 and X365 damaged in accident.
- July 1890 - X371 damaged in accident.
- 9 June 1898 - X381 damaged in accident.
- 2 November 1907 - X369 damaged in accident.
- 5 October 1916 - X359 damaged in collision at Melbourne Yard.
- 15 August 1918 - X375 damaged in accident at Newmarket.

=== Withdrawal ===
All the locomotives were removed from the Victorian Railways register between 1917 and 1920

== Fleet summary ==
Key:	In Service	Preserved	Stored or Withdrawn	Scrapped

Locomotive	Builder No.	Entered service	Withdrawn	Scrapped	Status	Notes
X353	185	3 August 1886	8 September 1920		Scrapped	
X355	186	20 August 1886	8 September 1920		Scrapped	
X357	187	1 October 1886	26 April 1919		Scrapped	
X359	188	5 November 1886	28 June 1919		Scrapped	
X361	189	22 November 1886	8 September 1920		Scrapped	
X363	190	6 December 1886	25 August 1917		Scrapped	
X365	191	20 December 1886	20 March 1920		Scrapped	
X367	192	12 January 1887	25 January 1917		Scrapped	
X369	193	3 January 1887	10 May 1919		Scrapped	
X371	194	10 February 1887	10 September 1917		Scrapped	
X373	195	14 March 1887	19 November 1920		Scrapped	
X375	196	5 April 1887	26 April 1919		Scrapped	
X377	197	10 June 1887	28 June 1919		Scrapped	
X379	198	24 May 1887	22 November 1919		Scrapped	
X381	199	20 June 1887	8 September 1920		Scrapped	
