= Sunshine rail disaster =

Severe Australian train accident in April 1908

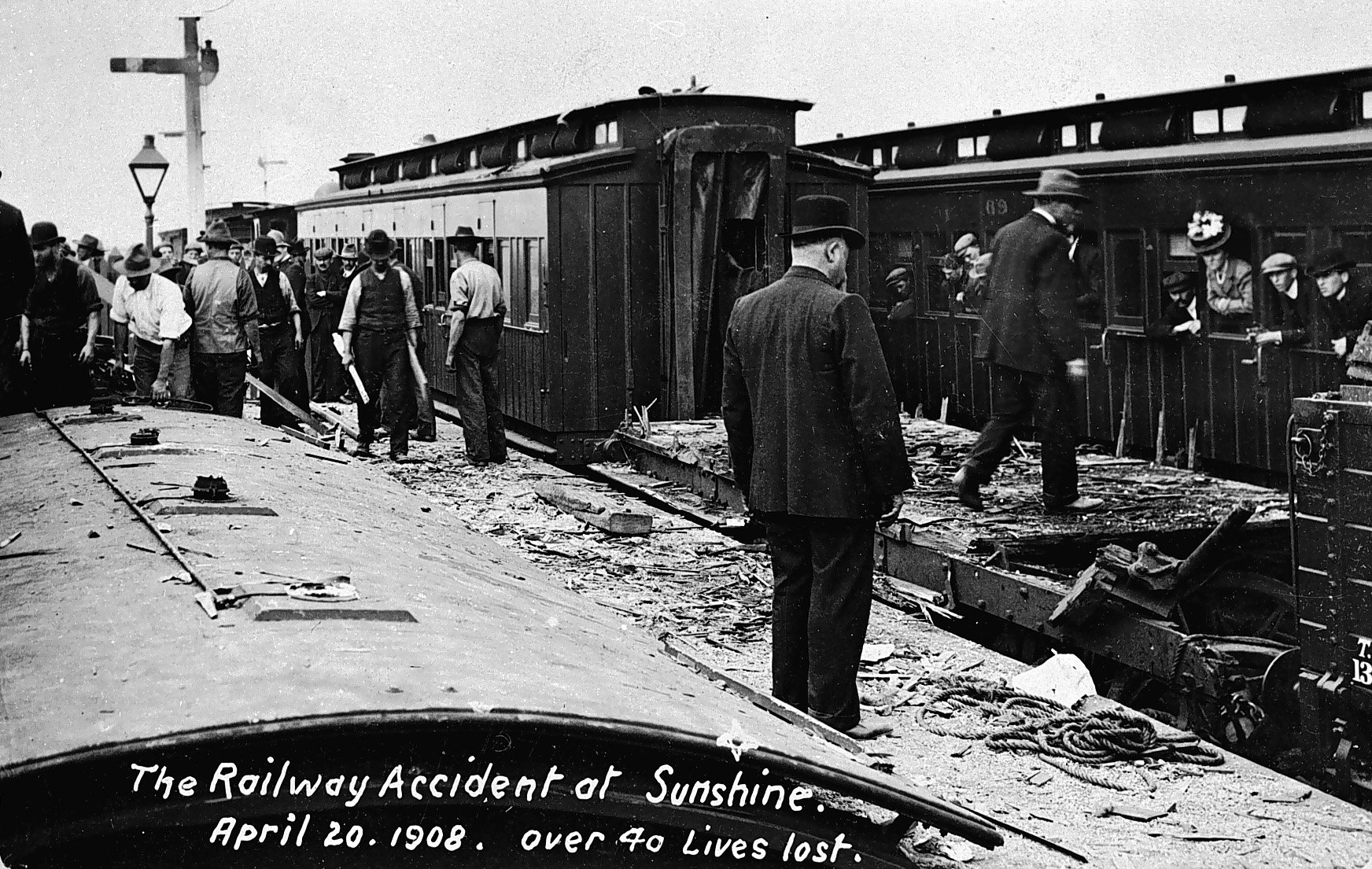
- One of the destroyed carriages after the accident. The intact roof of a carriage can be seen on the left.

- Location within Melbourne

Details
- Date: 20 April 1908; 10:50 pm
- Location: Sunshine, Victoria; 13.5 km (8.4 mi) NW from Melbourne
- Coordinates: 37°47′17″S 144°49′57″E
- Country: Australia
- Line: Bendigo railway line Ballarat railway line
- Operator: Victorian Railways
- Incident type: Rear-end collision
- Cause: Signal passed at danger due to brake failure on Bendigo train.

Statistics
- Trains: 2
- Deaths: 44
- Injured: 400+

On 20 April 1908, at the junction at Sunshine railway station (in Sunshine, Victoria, Australia) a Melbourne-bound train from Bendigo collided with the rear of a train from Ballarat. 44 people were killed and over 400 injured, almost all of them from the Ballarat train, as the Bendigo train was cushioned by its two locomotives.

A temporary mortuary was set up at Melbourne's Spencer Street Station to deal with the dead and wounded, who were transported from Sunshine by special relief trains. The disaster is Victoria's worst railway accident in terms of deaths, and is Australia's second-worst after the 1977 Granville rail disaster.

The subsequent coronial inquiry found that the two drivers of the Bendigo train as well as the Sunshine stationmaster had a manslaughter case to answer, although all three were later acquitted by the Supreme Court of Victoria.

== Crash ==
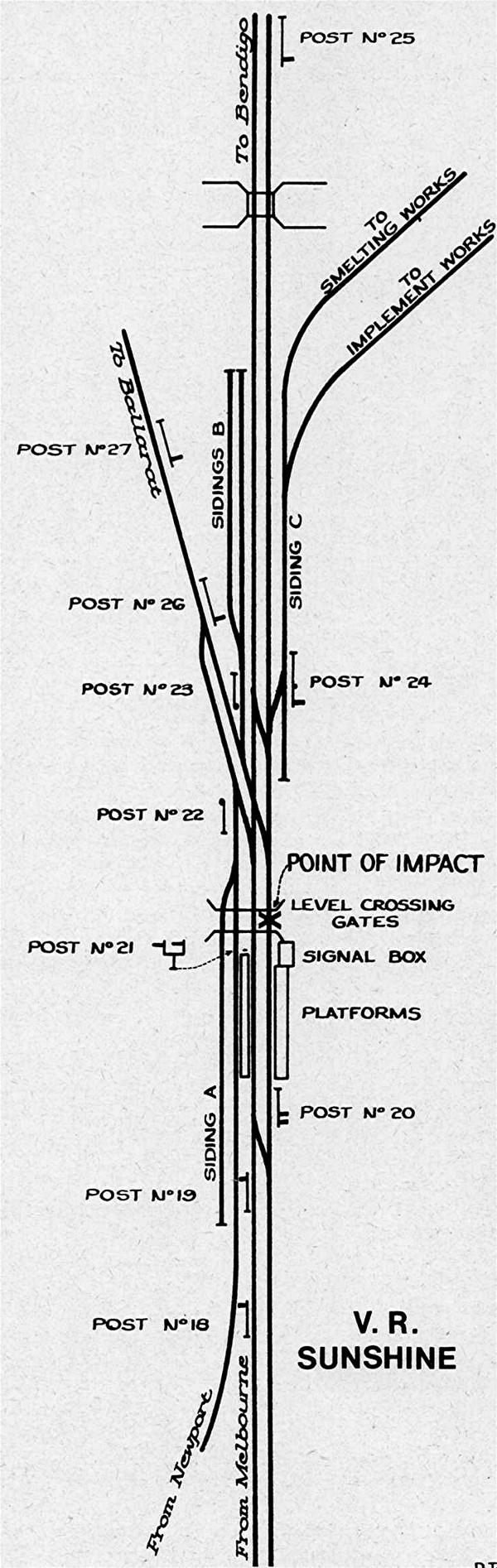
Diagram of track layout and signals at the time of the accident, showing distant (no. 25) and home (no. 24) signals

At 6:30 p.m. and 7:15 p.m. on 20 April, two heavily loaded passenger trains left the regional cities of Ballarat and Bendigo respectively. 20 April was an Easter Monday and therefore the end of a long weekend in Victoria. Fine weather had encouraged large numbers of people to leave Melbourne by train on the Saturday, and many were returning on the Monday evening. As a result, both trains were crowded, and the Ballarat train had been extended beyond its normal length.

The Ballarat train was drawn by two locomotives – A^{A} 534 and 'Old A' 202, and consisted of a post van, guard's van and 11 passenger carriages. The Bendigo train was drawn by A^{A} 564 and A^{A} 544, and consisted of a post van, horse box, 6 passenger carriages and a guard's van.

The Ballarat train reached Sunshine at 10:47 pm, 43 minutes behind schedule, and, because of the extra carriages, was too long for the platform at Sunshine. The driver allowed passengers at the front of the train to disembark, then moved the train forward so the rear carriages were at the platform.

The Bendigo train was also running late, and its driver, Leonard "Hell-fire Jack" Milburn – a nickname which his colleagues later denied had any connection to recklessness or speed – was under instructions to operate the train as an express unless passengers needed to alight.

The Ballarat and Bendigo lines were both controlled by absolute block signalling from the Sunshine signalbox. At Sydenham, the preceding signalbox on the Bendigo line, Milburn was given a "line clear" signal, because the Sunshine signaller had indicated the line was clear up to and through the station. The distant signal, 970 yards from the point of impact, and the home signal, 283 yards from the point of impact, were set at danger. (Note: Distances from diagram in The Age (22 April 1908).)

Milburn stated the following day that when he sighted the distant signal set to danger, he applied the brakes, but they did not have any effect. He subsequently set the locomotive in reverse and applied as much power as possible in an attempt to slow the train.

As the Ballarat train began to move away from Sunshine, it was struck by the Bendigo train. The impact destroyed the guard's van and four rearmost carriages of the Ballarat train, but only caused minor damage to the front of the Bendigo locomotive. Debris from the collision was thrown across both tracks and platforms of the station.

== Aftermath ==
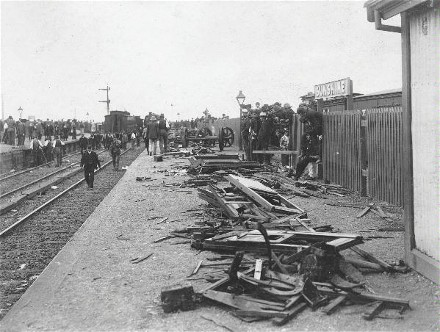
The wreckage on the platform on the morning following the accident

Immediately after the crash, lighting gas escaping from the damaged carriages caused a fire, which was extinguished by bystanders and the volunteer Sunshine fire brigade. The fire delayed attempts to rescue injured passengers trapped inside the train. Rescue efforts were further hampered by the lack of available equipment such as axes or stretchers, which had to be sourced from areas surrounding the station.

Uninjured occupants of the two trains and railway officials (including the drivers and firemen of both trains) began to extricate others from the wreckage immediately after the crash. In addition, a number of local residents who had seen or heard the accident ran to the station to assist with the rescue efforts.

Immediately after news of the crash reached Melbourne, railway officials began organising a relief train to carry supplies and rescue workers, as well as 4 doctors, to the scene of the crash. According to the Chair of the Railways Commissioners, Thomas Tait, the train left Spencer Street Station at 11:30p.m. and arrived at Sunshine at 12:17 a.m. Conflicting reports indicate that the train did not arrive until 12:45 a.m. or later, and Tait later denied that there had been undue delay in the response.

At 12:20 a.m., the undamaged front section of the Ballarat train left Sunshine carrying survivors of the crash. A second casualty train departed at 2:10 a.m. carrying 10 bodies as well as injured passengers requiring medical attention, and a third left at 3:35 with 22 bodies on board.

When casualty trains arrived at Spencer Street, most of the badly injured were taken to the Melbourne Hospital, while the dead were placed in waiting rooms for identification.

After all the bodies had been recovered from the wreckage at Sunshine, work began immediately to clear the railway line, and one line was reopened by 7:00 a.m. the morning after the accident. The Victorian Coroner visited the crash site through the morning of 22 April.

== Coronial inquiry ==
The inquiry began in the following May and did not conclude until July. Conflicting evidence was given as to the adequacy of the brakes on the lead locomotive of the Bendigo train. It was given in evidence that a report had been made the previous January that the siting of the home signal (protecting a train standing at the platform) was poor. That report went on to say, however, that the starting signal (at the Melbourne end of the platform) could be seen further out.

The driver of the lead locomotive on the Bendigo train had been working for 12 hours and 25 minutes at the time of the accident. He stated that the brakes had been working satisfactorily as far as St. Albans, the prior station. He applied the brakes gently upon passing the distant signal; about 200 m from the Home signal, however, "the train shot me forward as though the brakes had come off" and "the train appeared to run into the engine". Realising that his train was not going to stop prior to reaching the Home signal, the driver put the locomotive into reverse and opened the steam regulator to apply as much power as possible.

Conjecture exists as to whether the Sunshine Stationmaster had acted in accordance with the regulations then in force in accepting the Bendigo train from Sydenham whilst the Ballarat train was standing at his station. He had 20 years of service, including 20 months at Sunshine, but was alone. He had been continuously on duty for 10 hours without relief prior to the accident. He had applied repeatedly, but in vain, for qualified assistance.

== Result ==
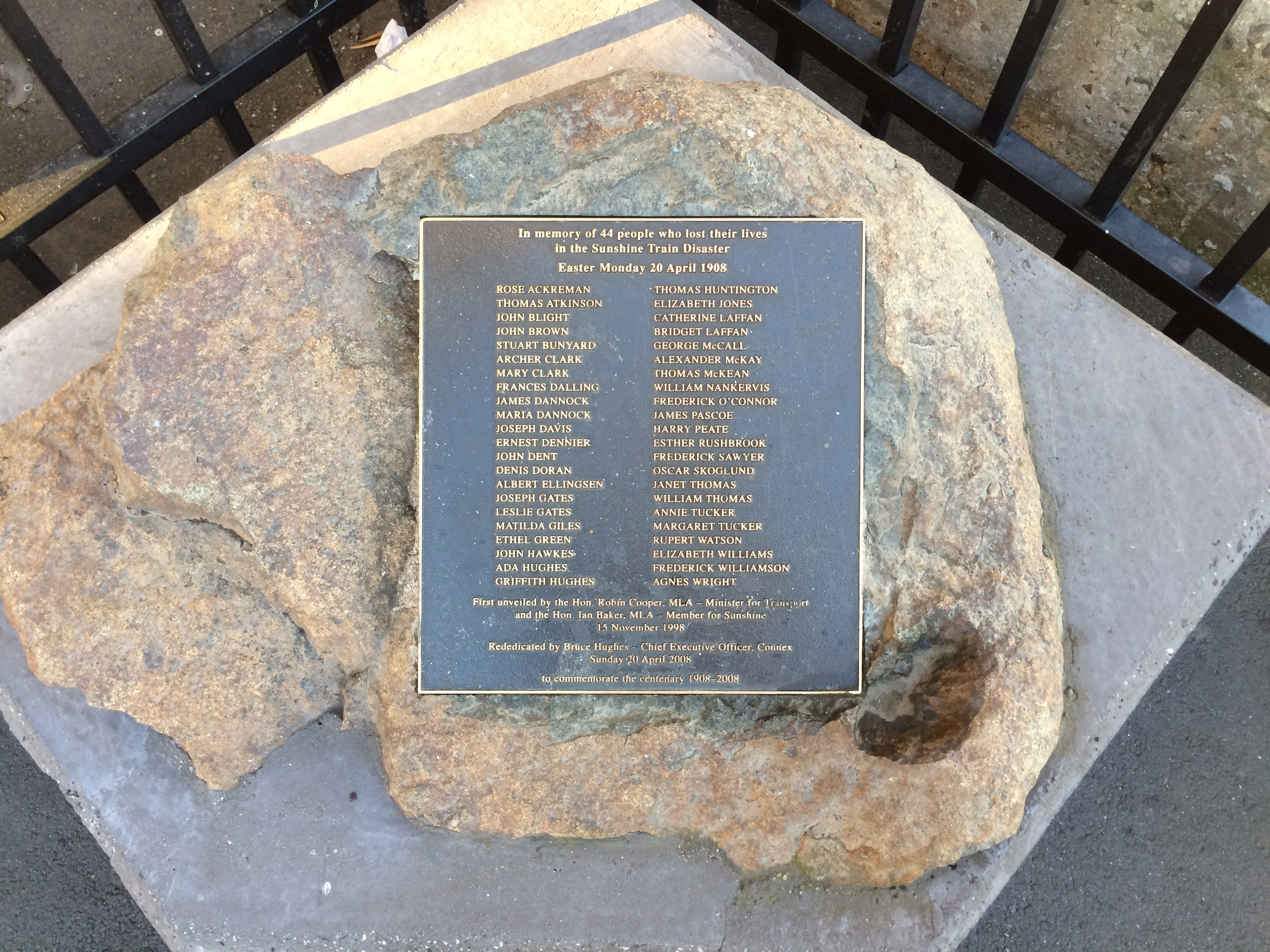
Memorial plaque commemorating the incident at Sunshine platform 1

The Coronial jury found that the drivers of both locomotives on the Bendigo train, together with the Stationmaster at Sunshine, had a case to answer. The charge of manslaughter against the stationmaster was later dropped; however, the drivers appeared before the Supreme Court from 24 September on that charge. The trial lasted two weeks.

In his summing up, the judge addressed the Court to the effect that the Crown case was that the driver of the lead locomotive had deliberately run past the distant signal at too great a pace and, expecting that the passage through the station would be clear, he found the home signal at danger and a train at the platform too late to stop clear. The judge concluded, however, that not one word of aspersion on a man's character had been suggested. The jury agreed with the judge's view and brought in a verdict of not guilty for both drivers of the Bendigo train.

== Compensation ==
The Victorian Railways Commissioners admitted liability and paid claims aggregating £125,000 by way of compensation. In addition, there was another £50,000 damage to rolling stock and tracks, plus the costs of the inquest and subsequent legal proceedings, which were borne by the State.
