= Victorian Railways B class (1861) =

Class of Australian 2-4-0 steam locomotives

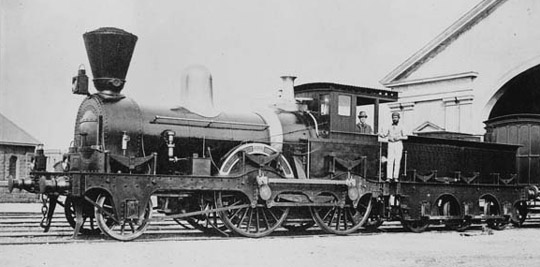
- B class with original spark-arresting funnel
Type and origin
- Power type: Steam
- Builder: Beyer, Peacock & Company, Manchester, UK (19); R and W Hawthorn, Newcastle upon Tyne, UK (13); Phoenix Foundry, Ballarat (2)
- Serial number: Beyer, Peacock: 231 - 237, 261 - 266, 1034 - 1039; R and W Hawthorn: 1138 - 1144, 1155 - 1160; Phoenix Foundry: 65 - 66
- Build date: 1861 - 1880
- Total produced: 34
Specifications
- Configuration
  - Whyte: 2-4-0
- Gauge: 5 ft 3 in (1,600 mm) Victorian broad gauge
- Leading dia.: 3 ft 6 in (1.07 m)
- Driver dia.: 6 ft 0 in (1,830 mm)
- Tender wheels: 3 ft 6 in (1.07 m)
- Wheelbase: 35 ft 8 1/2 in (10.884 m)
  - Coupled: 7 ft 9 in (2,360 mm)
  - Tender: 10 ft 9 in (3.28 m)
- Length
  - Over couplers: 45 ft 11 in (14.00 m)
- Height: 13 ft 6 in (4.11 m)
- Axle load: 14 long tons 6 cwt (32,000 lb or 14.5 t); 1904 diagram: 13 long tons 10 cwt (30,200 lb or 13.7 t); 1914 diagram: 13 long tons 12 cwt (30,500 lb or 13.8 t)
- Loco weight: 37 long tons 2 cwt (83,100 lb or 37.7 t); 1904 diagram: 35 long tons 6 cwt 2 qr (79,130 lb or 35.89 t); 1914 diagram: 36 long tons 10 cwt (81,800 lb or 37.1 t)
- Tender weight: 26 long tons 0 cwt (58,200 lb or 26.4 t); 1914 diagram: 26 long tons 7 cwt 2 qr (59,080 lb or 26.8 t)
- Total weight: 63 long tons 2 cwt (141,300 lb or 64.1 t); 1904 diagram: 61 long tons 6 cwt 2 qr (137,370 lb or 62.31 t); 1914 diagram: 62 long tons 17 cwt 2 qr (140,840 lb or 63.88 t)
- Fuel capacity: Rebuilt 1865: 70 long cwt (7,800 lb or 3,600 kg)
- Water cap.: 1,400 imp gal (6,400 L; 1,700 US gal); Rebuilt 1865: 1,915 imp gal (8,710 L; 2,300 US gal); 1904 diagram: 2,150 imp gal (9,800 L; 2,580 US gal); 1914 diagram: 2,100 imp gal (9,500 L; 2,500 US gal)
- Firebox
  - Grate area: 15.27 sq ft (1.419 m^{2})
- Boiler pressure: 130 psi (896 kPa); 1904 diagram: 102: 120 psi (827 kPa); 46 - 52, 56 - 74, 78, 80, 84, 86, 90, 94, 96, 104 - 112, 186, 188: 130 psi (896 kPa); 54, 76, 88: 140 psi (965 kPa); 1914 diagram: 186: 130 psi (896 kPa); 56, 76, 88: 140 psi (965 kPa)
- Heating surface
  - Firebox: 113.66 sq ft (10.559 m^{2})
  - Tubes: 901.62 sq ft (83.763 m^{2})
  - Total surface: 1,015.28 sq ft (94 m^{2})
- Cylinders: 2, inside
- Cylinder size: 16 in × 24 in (406 mm × 610 mm); 1904 diagram: 17 in × 24 in (432 mm × 610 mm)
Performance figures
- Tractive effort: 9,633 lbf (42.85 kN) at 100 psi 1904 diagram - 140psi: 10,790 lbf (48.0 kN); 1914 diagram - 140psi: 14,025 lbf (62.39 kN)
Career
- Operators: Victorian Railways
- Number in class: 34
- Numbers: Numbers at delivery: 32-51, 64-69, 82-87 (never ran with these), Numbers in service: 46-96, 102-112, 186-188 (even only)
- Nicknames: Overarmers
- Delivered: 1861
- First run: July 1862
- Last run: 9 June 1917
- Withdrawn: 1884 - 1917
- Disposition: All scrapped

The Victorian Railways B class was a class of 2-4-0 passenger locomotives operated by the Victorian Railways (VR) between 1862 and 1917, built by various builders. The B class locomotives are regarded as the first mainline VR motive power, and were highly successful in passenger operations.

== History ==
Victorian Railways initially numbered passenger and goods locomotives separately, the engines were delivered with numbers 32–51, 64–69, 82–87. This system was changed before these locos entered service to odd numbers for goods locomotives and even numbers for passenger locos with these locomotives taking the even numbers 46–96, 102–112, 186–188. This odd and even system remained in use until 1912. In 1886, they were allocated to Class B.

=== Production ===
The first order for seven locomotives was placed with R and W Hawthorn in February 1861 and in April 1861 for seven locomotives of the same design with Beyer, Peacock & Company. These were extended to, a further six from Hawthorn in October 1861 and a further six from Beyer Peacock in January 1862. The thirteen locomotives built by Beyer Peacock (builder's numbers 231–237, 261–266) arrived in Port Phillip mid 1862, while the thirteen locomotives built by Hawthorn (B/n 1138–1144, 1155–1160) arrived in Port Phillip late 1862.

In June 1871, further order for six locomotives was placed with Beyer Peacock (B/n 1034–1039) which arrived May 1972. The average of the imported locos was a cost of £3688-13-9 each. A further two were locally built by the Phoenix Foundry of Ballarat in 1880 (B/n 65–66).

=== Design features ===
The B class locomotives were easily recognisable by their use of external frames and bearings, with coupling rods mounted outside the frames, earning them the nickname "overarmers".

They featured an unusual design of firebox, which had two separate chambers, each with its own firedoor, divided by a water space that effectively acted as a thermic syphon, and joined at the tubeplate. The two fireboxes were designed to be worked separately, with one fire being built while the other was burning. That configuration was designed to extract the maximum heat from the wood fuels the VR used in its early years. However, the last two locomotives, built in the 1880s, had a conventional single firebox.

They used a 2-4-0 wheel arrangement, which provided greater traction on the new, more heavily graded Geelong–Ballarat railway and the Melbourne-Bendigo-Echuca railway, as opposed to the 2-2-2 arrangement previously selected for the relatively level Geelong line

=== Regular service ===
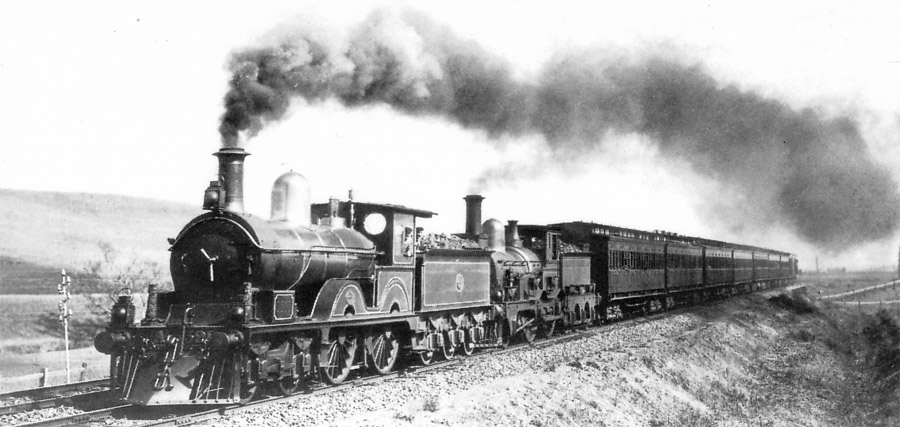
The Sydney Express circa 1900, with a New A class locomotive leading a B class locomotive

None of the locomotives had arrived in time for the opening of the Geelong to Ballarat line in April 1862, and passenger services on the line had to be worked by suburban saddle tank locomotives (later designated as L class) until the arrival of the first of these new main line locomotives in July 1862. They were initially used on passenger trains to cope with the steeper 1 in 50 grades of the Geelong–Ballarat railway, the Melbourne-Ballarat railway and the Melbourne-Bendigo-Echuca railway.

B50 was selected to haul the first Victorian Railways Royal Train in 1867, taking Prince Alfred Duke of Edinburgh to Ballarat, Bendigo and Castlemaine. The Royal Train was recorded running the 45 miles (72 km) between Melbourne and Geelong in as little as 52 minutes.

B88 had the honour of leading the first VR train to Albury on 14 June 1883. In 1894, they were allocated; two at Stawell; six at Melbourne; five at Bendigo; three at Geelong; six at Ballarat; four at Benalla; three at Seymour; and three stored. While the B class locomotives were highly successful on the expensively engineered 1860s mainlines for which they were designed, they were less suited for the more cheaply built extensions to the VR system. Future VR express passenger locomotives were to use a four-wheel leading bogie to steer the locomotive, and from 1884, a class of 4-4-0 locomotives (later classed 'Old A') began to supplement, and eventually supersede the B class.

Despite the delivery of the Old A, and the later and increasingly larger 'New A' and AA class 4-4-0s of 1889 and 1900 respectively, the entire B class (other than a couple of accident write-offs) lasted into the 20th century, with their roles ranging from double heading on express passenger trains to shunting duties. The last two in service (B56 & B76) spent their final days shunting carriages at Spencer Street Station and North Melbourne yards, and were withdrawn for scrapping in May and June 1917.

=== Design improvements ===
Over the years they were fitted with various alterations to the cabs. There were also various upgrades over the years; with constant improvements to safety — these including things like updates to safety valves (and domes), smokeboxs and chimneys (with spark arrestors), cowcatchers, and brakes.

B 50 and B 108 were used in comparative trials of the Woods hydraulic brake and the Westinghouse air brake systems in January 1884, leading to the Westinghouse system being adopted as the standard.During the 1880s, the locomotives' boiler pressure was increased from 130 psi (900 kPa) to 140 psi (970 kPa), and their cylinder bore increased from 16 to 17 inches (410 to 430 mm), with those rebuilt after 1896 being fitted with 17.5 inches (440 mm) cylinders. These changes led to considerably increased tractive effort.

=== Accidents ===
- 1860's - B78 ran away on Warrenheip Bank and through dead end Ballarat
- c.November 1876 - B82 cut rail in halves without derailing
- 2 April 1884 - B82 & B92 damaged beyond repair in a head-on collision on the Geelong line between Little River and Werribee
- 18 August 1884 - B72 boiler exploded at Warrenheip, locomotive was repaired and returned to service
- 1889 - B56 broke tender axle
- 1890 - B56 broke tender axle
- July 1895 - B88 collided with O69 at Spencer Street
- 13 April 1904 - B110 derailed when it pushed a rake of coal wagons off the end of the coal stage at Seymour and was left suspended by its tender, resting on the wreckage of the wagons below

=== Withdrawal ===
B82 and B92 were accident write-offs in 1884. The remainder were withdrawn between 1904 and 1917. An unknown boiler from either a B or O class was used until 1941 to power the refrigeration plant at Spencer Street where ice was made for T vans.

== Fleet summary ==
Key:	In service	Preserved	Stored or withdrawn	Scrapped

Locomotive	Previous numbers	Builder no.	Entered service	Withdrawn	Scrapped	Status	Notes
B46	32	231	August 1862	24 September 1904		Scrapped	
B48	33	232	August 1862	14 May 1904		Scrapped	
B50	34	233	August 1862	20 August 1904		Scrapped	Royal train for the Duke of Edinburgh - 17 October 1867
B52	35	234	July 1862	7 April 1906		Scrapped	
B54	36	235	August 1862	26 March 1910		Scrapped	
B56	37	236	August 1862	10 May 1917		Scrapped	
B58	38	237	August 1862	26 April 1906		Scrapped	
B60	46	261	March 1864	7 May 1904		Scrapped	
B62	47	262	July 1863	24 September 1904		Scrapped	
B64	48	263	September 1863	30 June 1909		Scrapped	
B66	49	264	March 1863	8 August 1904		Scrapped	
B68	50	265	April 1863	29 April 1905		Scrapped	
B70	51	266	March 1863	30 March 1907		Scrapped	
B72	39	1138	January 1863	8 October 1904		Scrapped	
B74	40	1139	January 1863	13 August 1904		Scrapped	
B76	41	1140	January 1863	9 June 1917		Scrapped	
B78	42	1141	January 1863	15 April 1905		Scrapped	
B80	43	1142	October 1863	21 July 1906		Scrapped	
B82	44	1143	1863	2 April 1884	2 April 1884	Scrapped	Destroyed in accident
B84	45	1144	August 1863	1 April 1905		Scrapped	
B86	64	1155	July 1864	8 October 1904		Scrapped	
B88	65	1156	July 1864	15 August 1914		Scrapped	
B90	66	1157	October 1864	15 October 1904		Scrapped	
B92	67	1158	1863	2 April 1884	2 April 1884	Scrapped	Destroyed in accident
B94	68	1159	May 1863	17 June 1911		Scrapped	
B96	69	1160	October 1863	15 December 1908		Scrapped	
B102	82	1034	May 1872	25 April 1908		Scrapped	
B104	83	1035	May 1872	14 November 1908		Scrapped	
B106	84	1036	June 1872	16 March 1907		Scrapped	
B108	85	1037	June 1872	16 January 1909		Scrapped	
B110	86	1038	June 1872	9 March 1907		Scrapped	
B112	87	1039	July 1872	28 March 1908		Scrapped	
B186	-	66	May 1881	15 August 1914		Scrapped	Exhibited at the Melbourne International Exhibition - 1880
B188	-	65	October 1880	30 September 1911		Scrapped	
