= Victorian Railways E class =

Class of Australian 2-4-2 steam locomotives

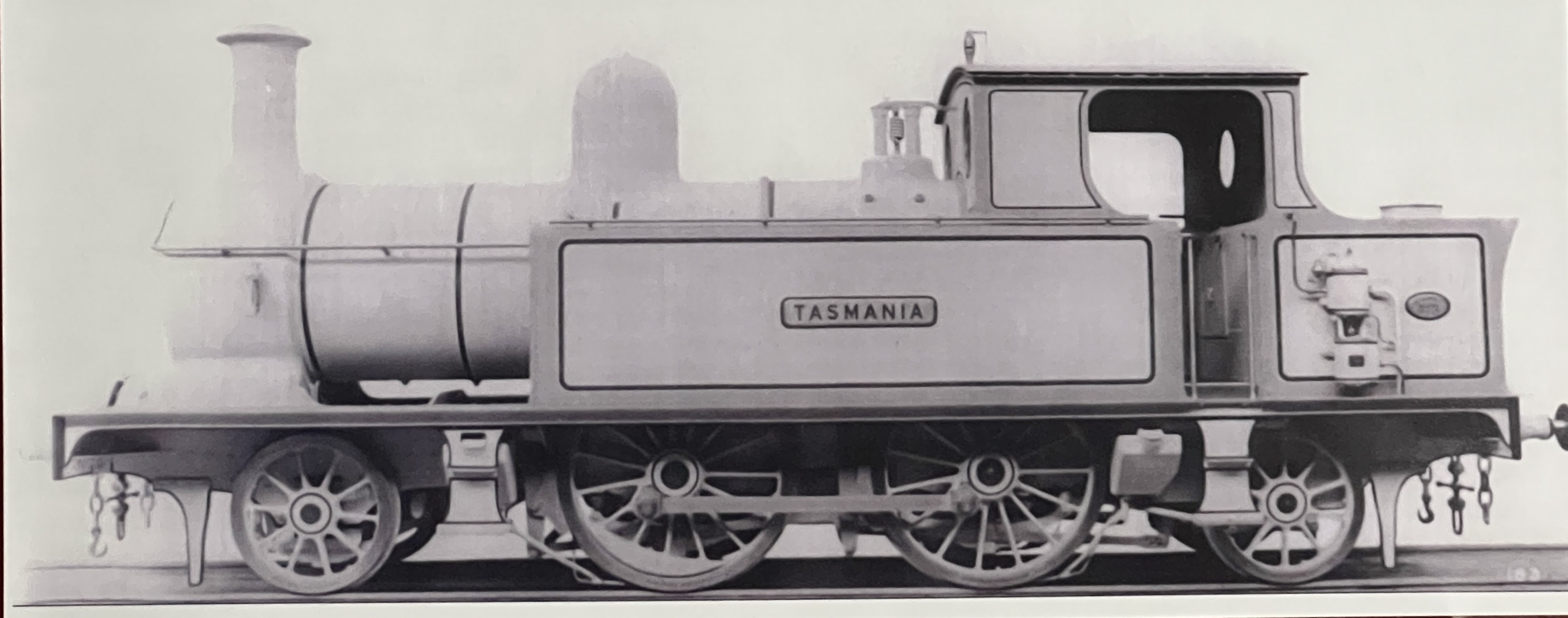
- Builders photo of Tasmania, 1888
Type and origin
- Power type: Steam
- Designer: Edward Alexander Jeffreys
- Builder: Kitson & Company, David Munro & Co, Phoenix Foundry
- Build date: 1888-1894
- Total produced: 71 (E 2-4-2T) + 5 (EE 0-6-2T)
- Rebuilder: Victorian Railways, Newport Workshops
- Rebuild date: 1898-1923
- Number rebuilt: 24
Specifications
- Configuration
  - Whyte: 2-4-2T (71) & 0-6-2T (5), later 24x 2-4-2 converted to 0-6-2.
- Gauge: 5 ft 3 in (1,600 mm)
- Driver dia.: 5 ft 0 in (1,524 mm)
- Wheelbase
  - Engine: 20' 10" (E 2-4-2) 20' 7" (EE 0-6-2)
  - Coupled: 6' 8" (E 2-4-2) 14' "2 (EE 0-6-2)
- Length: 33 ft 8 in (10.26 m)
- Height: 12 ft 9+1/2 in (3,898.9 mm)
- Axle load: 16 long tons 8 cwt (36,700 lb or 16.7 t)
  - Coupled: 16 long tons 8 cwt (36,700 lb or 16.7 t)
- Loco weight: 2-4-2: 53 long tons 8 cwt (119,600 lb or 54.29 tonnes) 0-6-2: 55 long tons 0cwt (110,000 lb or 55.88 tonnes)
- Fuel type: Coal
- Fuel capacity: 2 long tons 10 cwt (5,600 lb or 2.5 t)
- Water cap.: 1,600 imp gal (1,900 US gal; 7,300 L)
- Boiler pressure: 2-4-2: 100 lb per sq in (later 160 lb per sq in) 0-6-2: 140 to 170 lb per sq in (depending on the engine)
- Heating surface
  - Firebox: 83.50 sq ft (later 83.40 sq ft)
  - Total surface: 1,054.50 sq ft (later 1,072.08 sq ft)
Career
- Operators: Victorian Railways, South Australian Railways
- Numbers: E 2-4-2T: 426 (Kitson), 346 to 394 (even numbers, Phoenix Foundry), 12, 34, 36, 428 to 460 (even numbers, Phoenix Foundry) and 472 to 520 (even numbers, David Munro), later unclassed 236 (ex E506).
- Delivered: E 2-4-2T: 1888; EE 0-6-2T: 1893
- First run: E 2-4-2T: 1889; EE 0-6-2T: 1893
- Last run: E 2-4-2T: 1954; EE 0-6-2T: 1970
- Preserved: E 2-4-2T: Unclassed 236; EE 0-6-2T: E369, E371
- Scrapped: 1915-1967
- Current owner: VicTrack Heritage, Victorian Goldfields Railway.
- Disposition: 1 original E class and 2 EE class preserved, remainder scrapped

The E class is a class of suburban tank steam locomotive that ran on Australia's Victorian Railways (VR).

== History ==
During the late 19th century, Victorian Railways had ended up with a mixed fleet of locomotives of various designs, which had caused maintenance difficulties. To solve this, Richard Speight, a VR commissioner who had worked for the Midland Railway, set out a program to adopt standardized locomotive designs based on British practices. Tasked with designing locomotives for the scheme was Edward Alexander Jeffreys, who designed 5 classes of locomotive for Victorian Railways, all using standard parts. These would become the D class and New A class 4-4-0s, the New R class and Y class 0-6-0s, and the E class 2-4-2T.

After the design for Jeffreys' 2-4-2T design was finalised by VR, a contract was awarded to the Phoenix Foundry of Ballarat for construction of 45 locomotives, while an example was built by Kitson & Co of Leeds in 1888 for the Melbourne Centennial Exhibitions at the Royal Exhibitions Building, built to Jeffreys' original design without the local changes done by VR. The engine, named Tasmania, was displayed alongside an example of Jeffery’s 0-6-0 goods engine design (later Y class) named Victoria, also built by Kitson. In 1889, Tasmania entered service as E426.

Although considered to be a prototype due to it being the first E class delivered, Tasmania did not serve as the pattern engine of the class, as the Phoenix Foundry examples were already ordered by the time it was built.

In April 1890, Victorian Railways awarded another contract to David Munro & Company of South Melbourne. They would finish their first locomotive in 1892 and built more locomotives until the last one was completed in 1894.

Seventy engines were eventually built locally. They were numbered 346 to 394 (even numbers, Phoenix Foundry), 12, 34, 36, 428 to 460 (even numbers, Phoenix Foundry), and 472 to 520 (even numbers, David Munro).

Phoenix delivered five additional locomotives designated as the E^{E} class, numbered 462, 464, 466, 468, and 470. These had a new wheel arrangement of 0-6-2T, specifically designed for shunting use. After evaluation, engines 482 and 496 in 1898, followed by 490 and 478 in 1906-1907, were converted to the same format, although the latter two used 170psi boilers and 18-inch cylinders in place of the earlier 140psi boilers and 17-inch cylinders.

E426 (the Kitson locomotive) was the first E class to be withdrawn in 1915, and two more units in 1917. Melbourne's suburban electrification project made the 2-4-2T engines quickly obsolete. Between 1919-1923, twenty were converted to match the nine existing shunters' 0-6-2T configuration (all bar 494 upgraded to 18-inch cylinders), while another twenty-five were withdrawn. Of the latter group, twenty were sold to the South Australian Railways to become their second M class. An additional eighteen were withdrawn in 1924, leaving only a single 2-4-2T type in service.

In the 1923 locomotive renumbering scheme, the E^{E} class engines were reclassified in the 350-379 group. By 1929, this had expanded to 390, and the group was reclassified as E.

The original 2-4-2T engines were intended to take numbers 236-245 without a class letter. However, only one engine survived long enough to have the new number applied. Thus, 506 became 236.

== Class table ==
Builder	No.	Type	On register	E	Convert	Renumber	New E^{E} no.	Reclass as E	Sold to SAR	New M no.	Off register	Notes
Kitson	3088	2-4-2T	1889	426							1915	Pattern engine
Phoenix	251	2-4-2T	1889	346							1920	Damaged in accident 1891. Phoenix No.252 was not of this class.
Phoenix	253	2-4-2T	1889	348	1923	1923	380	1929			1959	
Phoenix	254	2-4-2T	1889	350					1920	256		
Phoenix	255	2-4-2T	1889	352					1920	262		
Phoenix	256	2-4-2T	1890	354							1924	
Phoenix	257	2-4-2T	1890	356							1917	
Phoenix	258	2-4-2T	1890	358							1924	
Phoenix	259	2-4-2T	1890	360							1924	
Phoenix	260	2-4-2T	1890	362	1922	-	362	1931			1954	
Phoenix	261	2-4-2T	1890	364	1922	-	364	Unknown			1955	Collision with engine M 316, 1903
Phoenix	262	2-4-2T	1890	366					1921	267		
Phoenix	263	2-4-2T	1890	368							1924	Accident 1890, derailed 1900, collision 1902
Phoenix	264	2-4-2T	1890	370	1922	-	370	1929			1959	
Phoenix	265	2-4-2T	1890	372					1920	257		Fitted with Gibson patented link-motion 1893; in Richmond 1908 accident
Phoenix	266	2-4-2T	1890	374	1921	-	374	1930			1961	At Ararat 1915-1916; first engine (with E386) painted red and chocolate livery in 1903.
Phoenix	267	2-4-2T	1890	376	1921	-	376	1930			1955	
Phoenix	268	2-4-2T	1890	378	1922	-	378	Unknown			1951	
Phoenix	269	2-4-2T	1890	380					1921	268		
Phoenix	270	2-4-2T	1890	382							1920	
Phoenix	271	2-4-2T	1890	384					1921	269		
Phoenix	272	2-4-2T	1890	386					1921	270		First engine (with E374) painted red and chocolate livery in 1903.
Phoenix	273	2-4-2T	1890	388							1924	
Phoenix	274	2-4-2T	1890	390	Unknown	-	390	Unknown			1955	Assume upgraded, else it would have been renumbered 237-245 range?
Phoenix	275	2-4-2T	1890	392							1920	
Phoenix	276	2-4-2T	1890	394							1924	
Phoenix	290	2-4-2T	1892	12							1924	
Phoenix	291	2-4-2T	1892	34	1921	1925	350	1929			1953	
Phoenix	292	2-4-2T	1892	36					1921	266		
Phoenix	293	2-4-2T	1892	428	1922	1925	351	1929			1954	
Phoenix	294	2-4-2T	1892	430					1921	271		
Phoenix	295	2-4-2T	1892	432							1924	
Phoenix	296	2-4-2T	1892	434					1920	258		
Phoenix	297	2-4-2T	1892	436	1923	1923	377	Unknown			1962	
Phoenix	298	2-4-2T	1893	438	1923	1923	381	1929			1954	Casualty at Jolimont 1901 with E 494
Phoenix	299	2-4-2T	1893	440					1920	263		
Phoenix	300	2-4-2T	1893	442							1924	Ran off end of siding, Hawthorn, 1899
Phoenix	301	2-4-2T	1893	444							1924	
Phoenix	302	2-4-2T	1893	446					1920	264		
Phoenix	303	2-4-2T	1893	448							1924	
Phoenix	304	2-4-2T	1893	450							1920	
Phoenix	305	2-4-2T	1893	452					1920	259		
Phoenix	306	2-4-2T	1893	454	1920	1923	352	1931			1954	
Phoenix	307	2-4-2T	1893	456					1921	272		
Phoenix	308	2-4-2T	1893	458					1921	273		
Phoenix	309	2-4-2T	1893	460							1917	
Phoenix	310	0-6-2T	1893	462	As built	1923	353	1929			1954	17in cylinders from new.
Phoenix	311	0-6-2T	1893	464	As built	1923	355	1929			1956	17in cylinders from new.
Phoenix	312	0-6-2T	1893	466	As built	1923	356	1929			1954	17in cylinders from new.
Phoenix	313	0-6-2T	1893	468	As built	1923	357	1929			1960	17in cylinders from new. Ran into North Melbourne Depot turntable pit
Phoenix	314	0-6-2T	1893	470	As built	1923	359	1929			1937	17in cylinders from new.
Munro	01	2-4-2T	1892	472							1924	
Munro	02	2-4-2T	1892	474							1924	Ran through South Yarra floods 1907
Munro	03	2-4-2T	1892	476							1924	
Munro	04	2-4-2T	1892	478	1907	1923	361	1929			1954	E^{E} upgrade used 18in cylinders. Ran off end of siding at Ringwood and overturned, 1908
Munro	05	2-4-2T	1892	480							1924	Fitted with Gibson patented link-motion 1893
Munro	06	2-4-2T	1892	482	1898	1924	363	Unknown			1955	E^{E} upgrade used 17in cylinders; 18in cylinders fitted in 1929. Collision with engine R 324, 1927
Munro	07	2-4-2T	1892	484	1921	1924	365	1930			1954	
Munro	08	2-4-2T	1892	486	1920	1924	366	Unknown			1956	
Munro	09	2-4-2T	1892	488							1924	Damaged in Newport Yards 1896
Munro	10	2-4-2T	1892	490	1906	1923	367	Unknown			1956	E^{E} upgrade used 18in cylinders.
Munro	11	2-4-2T	1892	492					1921	274		
Munro	12	2-4-2T	1892	494	1919	1923	369	1931			1962 (Preserved)	E^{E} upgrade used 17in cylinders. Accident with E 438 at Jolimont 1901 and Richmond 1908
Munro	13	2-4-2T	1892	496	1898	1923	371	1929			1963 (Preserved)	E^{E} upgrade used 17in cylinders; 18in cylinders fitted in 1929.
Munro	14	2-4-2T	1893	498	1920	1925	372	1931			1959	
Munro	15	2-4-2T	1893	500							1920	Accident at Spencer Street Station 1910
Munro	16	2-4-2T	1893	502							1924	
Munro	17	2-4-2T	1893	504					1920	260		
Munro	18	2-4-2T	1893	506							1954 (Preserved)	Renumbered 236 (unclassed) in 1923
Munro	19	2-4-2T	1893	508					1920	265		
Munro	20	2-4-2T	1893	510	1922	1924	373	1929			1956	Broken connecting rod pierced boiler, 1899
Munro	21	2-4-2T	1893	512							1924	
Munro	22	2-4-2T	1894	514	1923	1923	379	1931			1962	Hauled royal train from Port Melbourne, 1901
Munro	23	2-4-2T	1894	516					1920	261		
Munro	24	2-4-2T	1894	518	1920	1922	375	Unknown			1955	
Munro	25	2-4-2T	1894	520					1921	275		

== Retirements and preservation ==
In November 1937, E359 became the first 0-6-2T type to be taken off the register, while the remaining engines stayed on the register until the 1950s, with six of them continuing to operate until the early 1960s.

The last original 2-4-2T engine, 236, was used as a shunter at Newport Workshops until it was taken out of service in 1954. The locomotive had been selected by V.R for display at Spencer Street Station to mark the 100th anniversary of Victoria's railways as it was in good enough condition and unaltered from its original form, ultimately sparing it from immediate scrapping. The engine was restored and displayed from the 11th to the 25th of September, 1954. It was then stored at Newport Workshops and later allocated to the newly established ARHS Railway Museum in Newport as one of its first display pieces, where it resides today.

E369 and E377 were written off the register in February 1962, but were kept operational at Newport Workshops to act as yard pilots, which left only E371 to be the last 0-6-2T to be on the register, continuing until being written off in November 1963. E371 was moved to Newport Workshops for storage but returned to operation in 1967 to replace E377, which was poor condition. E377 was later scrapped, leaving only E369 and E371. Both continued to work as yard pilots at Newport Workshops until they were finally retired sometime in 1970.

E369 was placed into storage at Newport awaiting scrapping, but it avoided being broken up. In April 1972, E369 and L1157 were towed by R707 to Spencer Street Station for display purposes. Following this, E369 was once again placed into storage at Newport, but was rescued for preservation in 1973 with efforts of Gerald Dee. E369 now resides at the ARHS's Museum alongside 236.

E371 was also moved into storage at Newport Workshops and remained until the 1980s when it was bought by the Castlemaine & Maldon Railway Group. It would be transferred to Spotswood so it could be dismantled for future restoration. It was eventually found out that the locomotive had sustained significant damage to parts of its frames and boiler, which was considered too costly to repair at the time. Therefore, E371 was reassembled sometime in the 1990s and transferred to Maldon Railway Station for display. However, as of 2026, the VGR is planning to have E371 restored to operational condition, with funds aiming to reach $50,000 for the project. Once boiler inspections are completed, the parts will be transferred to Castlemaine where the restoration will commence.
