= Victorian Railways F class (1874) =

Class of Australian 2-4-0 steam locomotives

Victorian Railways F class (2-4-0)
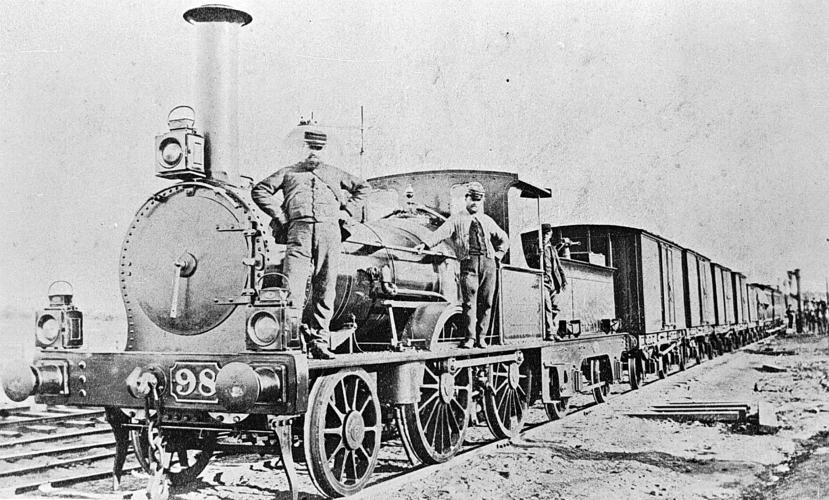
- An F class locomotive in the Central Highlands region, c. 1875
Type and origin
- Power type: Steam
- Builder: Beyer, Peacock & Company, Manchester, England (1); Phoenix Foundry (20)
- Serial number: Beyer, Peacock & Co: 1267; Phoenix: 28, 30, 31, 33-39, 55-64
- Build date: 1874, 1876-1877, 1879-1880
- Total produced: 21
- Rebuild date: New boiler: 1902-1912; 2-4-2 motor: 1910-1911
- Number rebuilt: New boiler: 21; 2-4-2 motor: 7 (see below)
Specifications
- Configuration
  - Whyte: 2-4-0
- Gauge: 5 ft 3 in (1,600 mm) Victorian broad gauge
- Leading dia.: 3 ft 6 in (1,070 mm)
- Driver dia.: 5 ft 0 in (1,520 mm)
- Tender wheels: 3 ft 6 in (1,070 mm)
- Wheelbase: 31 ft 4 in (9.55 m)
- Length: 41 ft 11 1/2 in (12.789 m)
- Height: 11 ft 11 5/8 in (3.648 m)
- Axle load: Original: 9 long tons 11 cwt (21,400 lb or 9.7 t); Rebuilt: 10 long tons 8 cwt (23,300 lb or 10.6 t)
- Fuel type: Coal
- Fuel capacity: Original: 60 long cwt (6,700 lb or 3,000 kg); Rebuilt: 70 long cwt (7,800 lb or 3,600 kg)
- Water cap.: Original: 1,710 imp gal (7,800 L; 2,050 US gal); Rebuilt: 2,600 imp gal (12,000 L; 3,100 US gal)
- Boiler pressure: Varies between120 psi (827 kPa) & 160 psi (1,103 kPa)
- Heating surface
  - Firebox: Original: 71.21 sq ft (6.616 m^{2}); Rebuilt: 72.4 sq ft (6.73 m^{2})
  - Tubes: Original: 764.65 sq ft (71.038 m^{2}); Rebuilt: 792.7 sq ft (73.64 m^{2})
  - Total surface: Original: 835.86 sq ft (78 m^{2}); Rebuilt: 865.1 sq ft (80 m^{2})
- Cylinders: 2
- Cylinder size: 15 3/4 in × 20 in (400 mm × 508 mm)
Performance figures
- Tractive effort: Original: 8,268 lbf (36.78 kN) at 100 psi; Rebuilt: 10,584 lbf (47.08 kN) at 80% boiler pressure
Career
- Operators: Victorian Railways
- Numbers: F98, F 126-F144 (even only), F 166-F184 (even only)
- First run: June 1874
- Last run: 24 June 1924 (50.1 years)
- Disposition: 7 converted, 14 scrapped

Victorian Railways F class motor (2-4-2T)
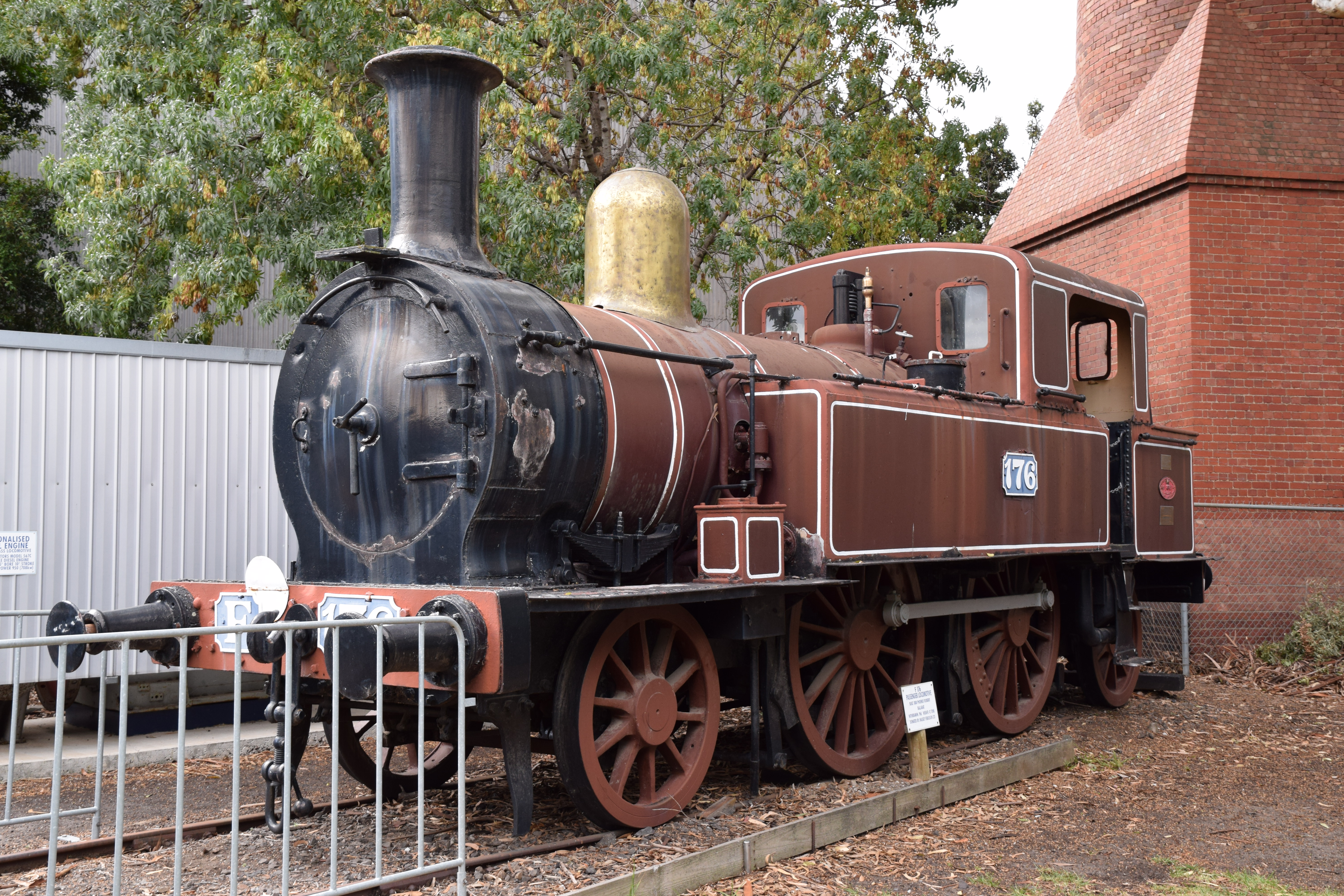
- F class branch locomotive in the Newport Railway Museum, 2016
Type and origin
- Power type: Steam
- Designer: Seipen, VR drawing office
- Build date: 1910-1911
- Total produced: 7
Specifications
- Configuration
  - Whyte: 2-4-2T
- Gauge: 5 ft 3 in (1,600 mm) Victorian broad gauge
- Leading dia.: 3 ft 6 in (1,070 mm)
- Driver dia.: 5 ft 0 in (1,520 mm)
- Trailing dia.: 3 ft 6 in (1,070 mm)
- Wheelbase: 19 ft 7 in (5.97 m)
- Length: 30 ft 7 1/4 in (9.328 m)
- Height: 11 ft 11 5/8 in (3.648 m)
- Axle load: 11 long tons 6 cwt (25,300 lb or 11.5 t)
- Fuel type: Coal
- Fuel capacity: 20 long cwt (2,200 lb or 1,000 kg)
- Water cap.: 1,100 imp gal (5,000 L; 1,300 US gal)
- Boiler pressure: 160 psi (1,103 kPa)
- Heating surface
  - Firebox: 72.4 sq ft (6.73 m^{2})
  - Tubes: 792.7 sq ft (73.64 m^{2})
  - Total surface: 865.1 sq ft (80 m^{2})
- Cylinders: 2
- Cylinder size: 15 3/4 in × 20 in (400 mm × 508 mm)
Performance figures
- Tractive effort: 10,584 lbf (47.08 kN) at 80% boiler pressure
Career
- Operators: Victorian Railways
- Numbers: F172-F184 (even only)
- First run: 1910
- Last run: 30 November 1929 (55.5 years)
- Disposition: 1 preserved, 6 scrapped

The Victorian Railways F class was originally a class of 2-4-0 light line passenger locomotives operated by the Victorian Railways between 1874 and 1929.

== History ==
Classed 'F' in 1886.

=== Production ===
The pattern engine was constructed by Beyer, Peacock & Company in 1874. An order for 20 more locomotives of this design was placed 2 years later with the Phoenix Foundry in Ballarat, with 10 built in 1876–77 and a further 10 in 1879–80. They were originally supplied with four-wheeled tenders, but were eventually provided with larger six-wheeled ones which increased their water capacity to 1,710 imp gal (7,800 L; 2,050 US gal).

=== Regular service ===
In early life they were mainly used on the main lines radiating form Ballarat and Ararat. By 1894, 3 were allotted to Geelong, 5 to Ararat, 3 to Ballarat, 2 to Seymour, 2 to Benalla, 2 to Princes Bridge, and 4 to Sale.

=== Design improvements ===
All were reboilered between 1902-12, along with the T class, to a new common, larger boiler type.

==== 2-4-2T motors ====
In 1910-11, the Victorian Railways decided to convert seven of them into "motor" locomotives for use in outer suburban areas. The tenders were removed and they became 2-4-2 tanks. They kept their numbers 172–184 (evens only).

=== Accidents ===
- 10 November 1878 - F98 ran through the end on the engine shed at Dunolly
- 26 July 1881 - F98 collided with H160 at Beaufort
- ? - F142 in collision at Creswick
- 11 March 1897 - F172 derailed at Cannon Hill near Warrnambool

=== Withdrawal ===
The un-rebuilt tender engines were taken off register between 1916 and 1924, and the "motors" were taken off between 1920 and 1929. F184 was sold to Earlston, Cranbourne for £750.
One of the 2-4-2T class survives, number 176, having been sold to the Sunshine Harvester Works in 1920 for £1500, where was used as a shunter until 1961. It was then donated to the Newport Railway Museum, and is the oldest surviving Victorian Railway locomotive, having been built in 1880.

== Fleet summary ==
Key:	In Service	Preserved	Stored or Withdrawn	Scrapped

Locomotive	Builder No.	Entered service	Converted to 2-4-2T	Withdrawn	Scrapped	Status	Notes
F98	1267	June 1874	-	13 March 1919		Scrapped	
F126	28	9 August 1876	-	7 August 1916		Scrapped	
F128	30	16 October 1876	-	27 June 1916		Scrapped	
F130	31	19 October 1876	-	7 June 1919		Scrapped	
F132	33	10 January 1877	-	8 November 1916		Scrapped	
F134	34	11 January 1877	-	24 January 1916		Scrapped	
F136	35	1 February 1877	-	8 July 1922		Scrapped	
F138	36	30 January 1877	-	24 June 1924		Scrapped	
F140	37	6 February 1877	-	15 July 1922		Scrapped	
F142	38	10 March 1877	-	10 June 1922		Scrapped	
F144	39	27 March 1877	-	8 July 1922		Scrapped	
F166	55	April 1879	-	15 July 1922		Scrapped	
F168	56	June 1879	-	25 January 1917		Scrapped	
F170	57	July 1879	-	24 January 1916		Scrapped	
F172	58	November 1879	1910-11	7 November 1928		Scrapped	
F174	59	December 1879	1910-11	30 November 1929		Scrapped	
F176	61	January 1880	1910-11	28 May 1920		Sold to Sunshine Harvester Works. Donated to Museum. Display	
F178	62	January 1880	1910-11	29 June 1926		Scrapped	
F180	63	February 1880	1910-11	29 June 1926		Scrapped	
F182	60	December 1879	1910-11	12 September 1925		Scrapped	
F184	64	March 1880	1910-11	29 February 1926		Sold to Earlston, Cranbourne	

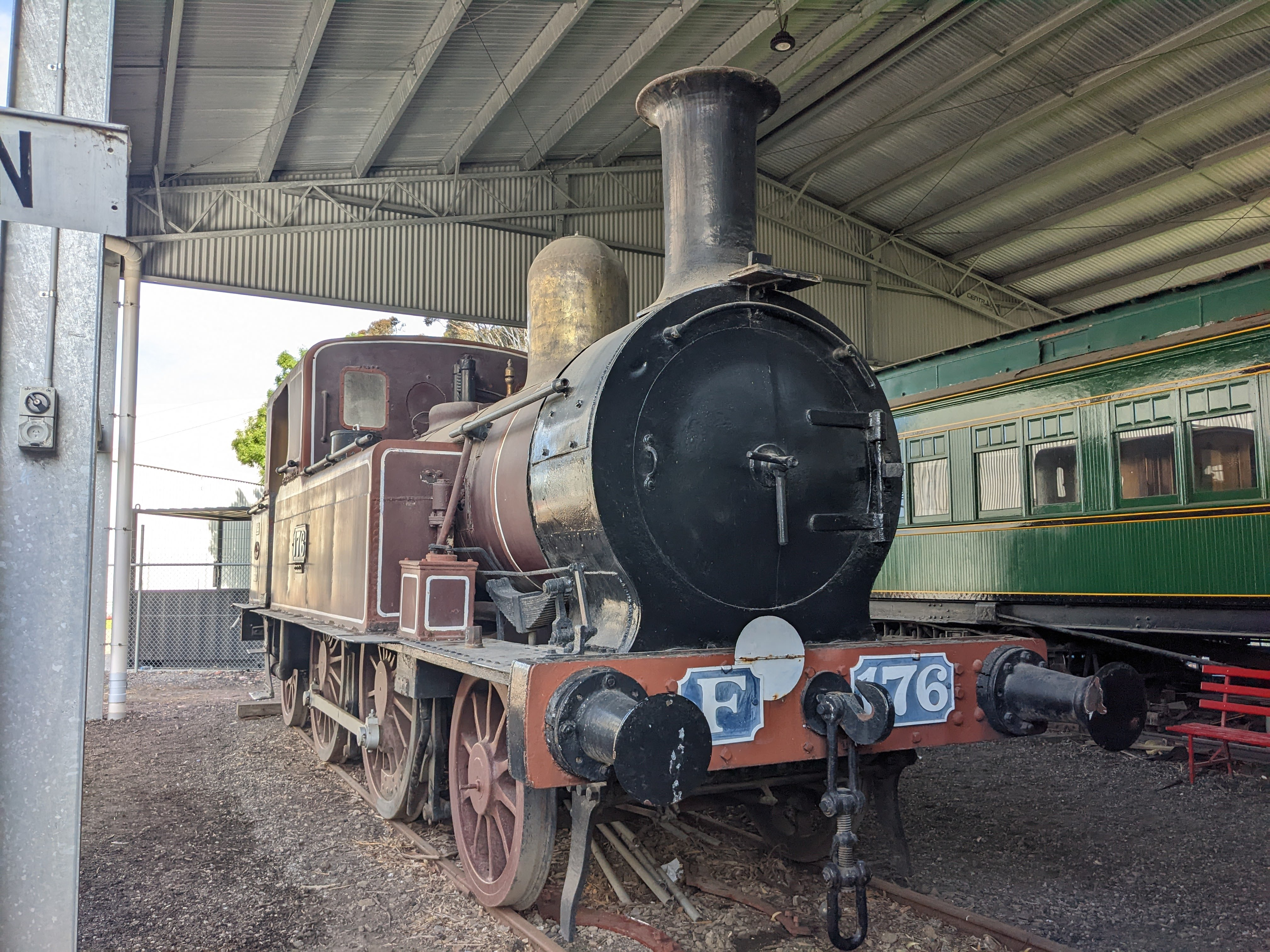
F176 on display at Newport Railway Museum in 2022
