= Victorian Railways Q class =

Class of Australian 0-6-0 locomotives

Victorian Railways Q Class
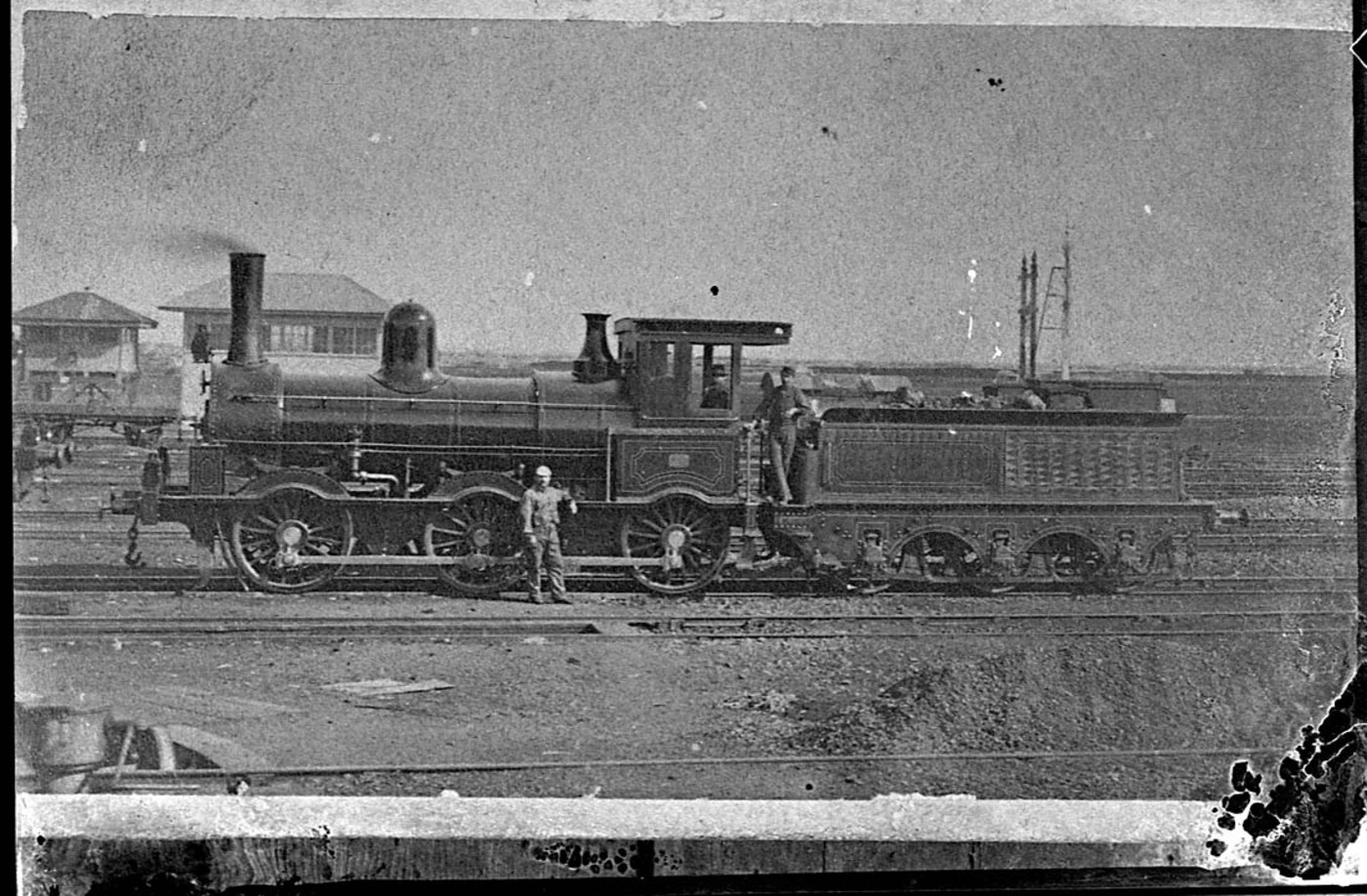
Type and origin
- Power type: Steam
- Builder: Phoenix Foundry
- Serial number: 83-101 (Odd only)
- Total produced: 10
Specifications
- Configuration
  - Whyte: 0-6-0
- Gauge: 1,600 mm (5 ft 3 in)
Career
- Operators: Victorian Railways
- Nicknames: Greenbacks
- Disposition: Nine scrapped, one sold to Altona Bay Coal Company

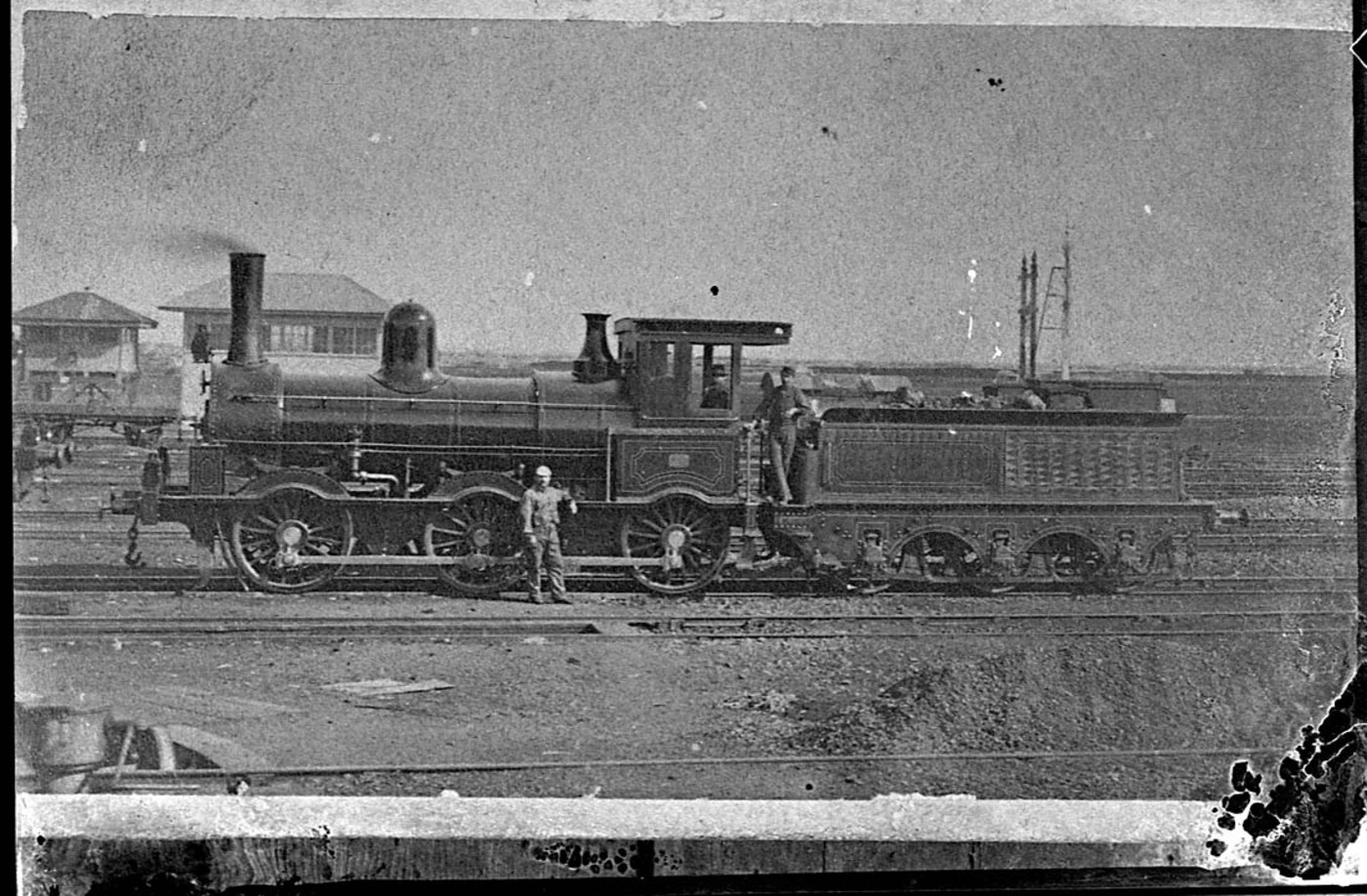
Q class locomotive

Victorian Railways' Q class was a class of steam locomotives built for the Wodonga line.

The first locomotives came from Phoenix Foundry. They were a class of 10 0-6-0 tender engines built in 1873–74. They were numbered 83-101 (odd numbers only). They were classed Q in 1886. They were taken off register between 1905 and 1908. None were preserved.
