= Victorian Railways O class =

Class of Australian 0-6-0 steam locomotives

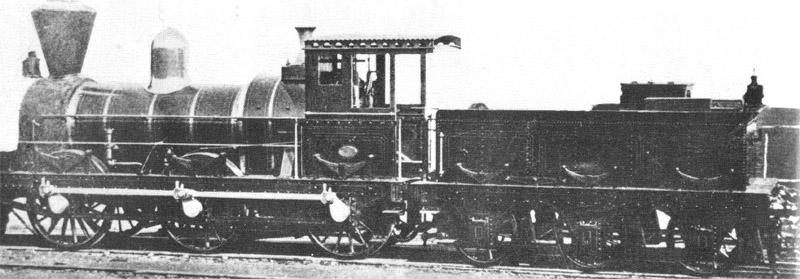
Type and origin
- Power type: Steam
- Builder: Beyer, Peacock & Company, Manchester, UK (11); Slaughter, Gruning & Co., Bristol, UK (6); Robert Stephenson & Company, Newcastle upon Tyne, UK (12); Yorkshire Engine Company, Sheffield, UK (6); VR - Williamstown Workshops (2); Phoenix Foundry, Ballarat (7)
- Serial number: Beyer, Peacock: 553 - 558, 1040, 1041, 1709 - 1711; Slaughter & Grüning: 460 - 465; Robert Stephenson: 1441 - 1452; Yorkshire Engine: 153 - 158; Phoenix Foundry: 48 - 54
- Build date: 1861 - 1881
- Total produced: 44
Specifications
- Configuration
  - Whyte: 0-6-0
- Gauge: 5 ft 3 in (1,600 mm) Victorian broad gauge
- Driver dia.: 5 ft 0 in (1,520 mm)
- Tender wheels: 3 ft 6 in (1.07 m)
- Wheelbase: 33 ft 10 in (10.31 m)
  - Coupled: 15 ft 11 in (4,850 mm)
  - Tender: 10 ft 9 in (3.28 m)
- Length
  - Over couplers: 45 ft 8 in (13.92 m)
- Height: 13 ft 6 in (4.11 m)
- Axle load: 13 long tons 8 cwt (30,000 lb or 13.6 t); 1904 diagram: 15 long tons 6 cwt (34,300 lb or 15.5 t); 1914 diagram: 15 long tons 17 cwt (35,500 lb or 16.1 t)
- Loco weight: 38 long tons 11 cwt (86,400 lb or 39.2 t); 1904 diagram: 37 long tons 12 cwt (84,200 lb or 38.2 t); 1914 diagram: 39 long tons 5 cwt (87,900 lb or 39.9 t)
- Tender weight: 25 long tons 13 cwt (57,500 lb or 26.1 t); 1904 diagram: 25 long tons 13 cwt 1 qr (57,480 lb or 26.07 t); 1914 diagram: 25 long tons 12 cwt 2 qr (57,400 lb or 26.04 t)
- Total weight: 64 long tons 4 cwt (143,800 lb or 65.2 t); 1904 diagram: 63 long tons 5 cwt 1 qr (141,710 lb or 64.28 t); 1914 diagram: 64 long tons 17 cwt 2 qr (145,320 lb or 65.92 t)
- Fuel capacity: Rebuilt 1865: 70 long cwt (7,800 lb or 3,600 kg); 1914 diagram: 60 long cwt (6,700 lb or 3,000 kg)
- Water cap.: 1,400 imp gal (6,400 L; 1,700 US gal); Rebuilt 1865: 1,915 imp gal (8,710 L; 2,300 US gal); 1904 diagram: 2,150 imp gal (9,800 L; 2,580 US gal); 1914 diagram: 2,100 imp gal (9,500 L; 2,500 US gal)
- Firebox
  - Grate area: 17.77 sq ft (1.651 m^{2}); 1904 diagram: 20.62 sq ft (1.916 m^{2})
- Boiler pressure: Original: 130 psi (896 kPa) 1904 diagram: 27, 41: 120 psi (827 kPa); 19 - 25, 29 - 39, 43 - 55, 59 - 81, 127, 129, 135, 139, 141, 145, 147: 130 psi (896 kPa); 57, 131, 133, 137, 143, 149: 140 psi (965 kPa); 135: 160 psi (1,103 kPa); 1914 diagram: 129: 130 psi (896 kPa); 131, 149: 140 psi (965 kPa); 45, 51, 67, 69, 71, 79, 81, 133, 135, 137, 139, 141, 143, 145, 147: 160 psi (1,103 kPa)
- Heating surface
  - Firebox: 137.75 sq ft (12.797 m^{2}); 1904 diagram: 100.00 sq ft (9.290 m^{2})
  - Tubes: 1,014.14 sq ft (94.217 m^{2}); 1904 diagram: 1,125.72 sq ft (104.583 m^{2})
  - Total surface: 1,151.89 sq ft (107 m^{2}); 1904 diagram: 1,225.72 sq ft (113.873 m^{2})
- Cylinders: 2, inside
- Cylinder size: 17 in × 24 in (432 mm × 610 mm); 1914 diagram: 17 1/2 in × 24 in (444 mm × 610 mm)
Performance figures
- Tractive effort: 11,560 lbf (51.4 kN) at 100 psi 1904 diagram - 140psi: 12,950 lbf (57.6 kN); 1914 diagram - 160psi: 15,680 lbf (69.7 kN)
Career
- Operators: Victorian Railways
- Number in class: 44
- Numbers: Numbers at delivery: 26-31, 52-63, 70-81, 88-89 (never ran with these), Numbers in service: 19-81, 127-149 (odd only)
- Nicknames: Overarmers
- Delivered: 1861
- First run: October 1862
- Last run: 10 June 1922
- Withdrawn: 1904 - 1922
- Disposition: All scrapped

The Victorian Railways O class was a class of 0-6-0 goods locomotives operated by the Victorian Railways between 1862 and 1922, built by various builders.

== History ==
Victorian Railways initially numbered passenger and goods locomotives separately, the engines were delivered with numbers 26–31, 52–63, 70–81, 88–89. This system was changed before these locos entered service to odd numbers for goods locomotives and even numbers for passenger locos with these locomotives taking the odd numbers 19–81, 127–149. This odd and even system remained in use until 1912. In 1886, they were allocated to Class O.

=== Production ===
The first order for six locomotives was placed with Slaughter, Gruning & Co. (builder's numbers 460–465) in April 1861 and twelve locomotives with Robert Stephenson & Company (B/n 1441–1452) in January 1862. The locomotives built by Slaughter, Grüning (B/n 231–237, 261–266) arrived in Port Phillip June 1862, and the Robert Stephenson ones in October 1862.<

In June 1865, an order for six more locomotives was placed with Beyer, Peacock & Company (B/n 553–558) which arrived May 1866. In 1870, a further order for six more locomotives was placed with Yorkshire Engine Company (B/n 153–158) which arrived March 1871. The last imports were ordered from Beyer Peacock, two in July 1871 (B/n 1040–1041) and three in 1878 (B/n 1709–1711). The imported locos had an average cost of £3919-14-10 for each.

Seven locomotives were locally built by the Phoenix Foundry of Ballarat in 1878/9 (B/n 48–54) and a further two by the Victorian Railways at the Williamstown Workshops in 1879 and 1881 at an average cost of £4142-15-0 for each local loco.

=== Regular service ===
Before entering regular service, O129 was exhibited at the Melbourne International Exhibition in 1880.
In 1894, they were allocated; ten at Melbourne; fourteen at Bendigo; ten at Ballarat and ten at Benalla.

=== Design improvements ===
Over the years they were fitted with various alterations to the cabs. There were also various upgrades over the years; with constant improvements to safety — these including things like updates to safety valves (and domes), smokeboxs and chimneys (with spark arrestors), cowcatchers, and brakes.

There were subsequent reboilerings which raised the working pressure to 140 psi (970 kPa) then to 160 psi (1,100 kPa), while their cylinder bore was increased from 17 to 17.5 inches (430 to 440 mm) when rebuilt after 1896. These changes led to considerably increased tractive effort.

=== Accidents ===
- 15 October 1862 - O25 derailed after hitting spoil bank at Elphinstone
- 1870 - O57 derailed at Harcourt
- 1872 - O51 boiler exploded at North Melbourne, locomotive was repaired and returned to service
- 20 August 1873 - O23 boiler exploded at Geelong, locomotive was repaired and returned to service
- 1 September 1876 - O49 derailed at Melbourne Yard
- 4 September 1876 - O53 involved in accident at Riddells Creek
- 13 February 1877 - O43 derailed between Epsom and Huntly due to floods
- November 1877 - O53 involved in accident at Woodend
- 5 January 1879 - O149 ran away Melbourne Yard
- April 1879 - O65 broke leading axle at Gisborne
- August 1879 - O65 collided with V17 in Melbourne Yard
- 11 July 1881 - O135 involved in accident on North East line
- 28 August 1883 - O79 collided with L20 at Newmarket
- January 1884 - O27 collided with S215 at Warrenheip Bank
- 2 April 1884 - O49 boiler exploded at Sunbury, locomotive was repaired and returned to service
- 9 July 1884 - O35 broke crank axle
- November 1884 - O145 collided with A202 in Melbourne Yard
- February 1885 - O31 collided with R315 in Melbourne Yard
- November 1887 - O51 boiler exploded at Elphinstone, locomotive was repaired and returned to service
- 22 August 1894 - O71 collided with R477 at Baddaginnie
- July 1895 - O69 collided with B88 at Spencer Street
- October 1895 - O19 ran off-road at Williamstown
- 15 March 1897 - O141 involved in accident on Mordialloc line
- April 1905 - O67 in shops after accident
- January 1907 - O27 involved in accident at Williamstown
- 3 February 1910 - O149 derailed with D^{D}616 at Trawalla

=== Demise ===
Some were used as a stationary engines at Newport Workshops; O31 from 24 December 1908, five (O35, O39, O41, O53, O61) from 19 May 1909, and finally the boiler from O149 was used in a forge at Newport from 21 August 1916. In 1912, O57's frames were sold to Mr Freeman of Echuca for £423, while its tender was sold to Kerang & Koondrook Tramway for £60. On 19 May 1909, O63 converted to stationary engine and sold to Mr Arbuthnott of Koondrook (along with the boiler of R173) and was used in PS Arbuthnot.
. The remainder were withdrawn between 1904 and 1921.

An unknown boiler from either an O or B class was used until 1941 to power the refrigeration plant at Spencer Street where ice was made for T vans.

== Fleet summary ==
Key:	In service	Preserved	Stored or withdrawn	Scrapped

Locomotive	Previous numbers	Builder no.	Entered service	Withdrawn	Scrapped	Status	Notes
O19	70	553	September 1866	11 August 1906		Scrapped	
O21	71	554	October 1866	30 June 1906		Scrapped	Reboilered - 29 July 1884
O23	26	460	October 1862	25 March 1905		Scrapped	New chimney - July 1896
O25	27	461	October 1862	21 November 1908		Scrapped	New chimney - July 1886
O27	28	462	October 1862	19 September 1908		Scrapped	
O29	29	463	November 1862	12 August 1905		Scrapped	Reboilered - 6 January 1882. New chimney - January 1882
O31	30	464	December 1862	24 December 1908		Scrapped	Painted brown - March 1903. Stationary boiler at Newport - 24 December 1908
O33	31	465	December 1862	1 October 1904		Scrapped	
O35	52	1441	February 1863	19 May 1909		Scrapped	Stationary engine at Newport - 19 May 1909
O37	53	1442	December 1862	25 March 1905		Scrapped	
O39	54	1443	February 1863	19 May 1909		Scrapped	New boiler and chimney - 6 May 1882. Stationary engine at Newport - 19 May 1909
O41	55	1444	February 1863	19 May 1909		Scrapped	Stationary engine at Newport - 19 May 1909
O43	56	1445	February 1863	13 August 1904		Scrapped	
O45	57	1446	February 1863	19 June 1915		Scrapped	
O47	58	1447	October 1863	13 August 1904		Scrapped	Reboilered - 28 July 1883. New chimney - 28 April 1887
O49	59	1448	November 1863	1 April 1905		Scrapped	
O51	60	1449	July 1863	27 December 1913		Scrapped	
O53	61	1450	December 1863	19 May 1909		Scrapped	New chimney - 31 January 1877. New chimney - 15 February 1887. Stationary engine at Newport - 19 May 1909
O55	62	1451	December 1863	29 July 1905		Scrapped	
O57	63	1452	January 1864	24 July 1912		Scrapped	Frames sold to Mr Freeman of Echuca (£423). Tender sold to Kerang & Koondrook Tramway (£60)
O59	72	555	September 1866	16 June 1906		Scrapped	
O61	73	556	October 1866	19 May 1909		Scrapped	New chimney - 10 July 1885. Stationary engine at Newport - 19 May 1909
O63	74	557	September 1866	19 May 1909		Scrapped	New chimney - 24 September 1885. Converted to stationary engine and sold to Mr Arbuthnott of Koondrook with boiler of R173 - 19 May 1909. Boiler used in PS Arbuthnot
O65	75	558	July 1866	27 September 1913		Scrapped	
O67	88	1040	June 1872	26 April 1919		Scrapped	
O69	89	1041	June 1872	19 February 1920		Scrapped	
O71	76	153	June 1871	22 November 1919		Scrapped	
O73	77	154	July 1871	27 September 1913		Scrapped	
O75	78	155	May 1871	28 October 1905		Scrapped	
O77	79	156	April 1871	7 July 1906		Scrapped	
O79	80	157	May 1871	27 April 1921		Scrapped	Tender fitted to O149 - 10 February 1910
O81	81	158	May 1871	19 September 1918		Scrapped	
O127	-	-	September 1879	30 January 1909		Scrapped	Cowcatcher fitted - 17 May 1888
O129	-	-	June 1881	26 April 1919		Scrapped	Exhibited at the Melbourne International Exhibition - 1880
O131	-	48	October 1878	10 May 1919		Scrapped	Tender fitted to O149 - 9 February 1907
O133	-	49	January 1879	19 May 1917		Scrapped	Cowcatcher fitted - 15 July 1891
O135	-	50	February 1879	10 June 1922		Scrapped	New chimney - 17 February 1887
O137	-	51	March 1879	13 October 1919		Scrapped	Cowcatcher fitted - 6 June 1891
O139	-	52	May 1879	22 November 1919		Scrapped	Cowcatcher fitted - 29 November 1890
O141	-	53	June 1879	10 May 1919		Scrapped	Cowcatcher fitted - 16 April 1891
O143	-	54	July 1889	13 October 1919		Scrapped	
O145	-	1709	February 1878	20 August 1917		Scrapped	Cowcatcher fitted - 6 September 1890
O147	-	1710	March 1878	28 June 1919		Scrapped	Cowcatcher fitted - 3 August 1888. New chimney - 4 August 1888
O149	-	1711	March 1878	17 June 1916		Scrapped	New cab - 10 March 1891. Tender from O131 fitted - 9 February 1907. Tender from O79 fitted - 10 February 1910. Boiler in forge at Newport - 21 August 1916
