= Victorian Railways T class (1874) =

Class of Australian 0-6-0 steam locomotives

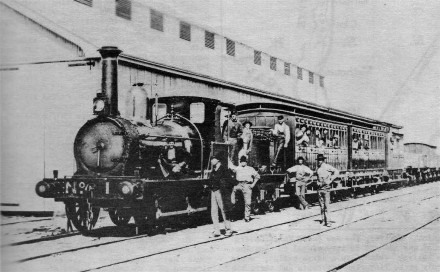
- The Deniliquin and Moama Railway Company's locomotive No.1, with Mixed Train, at Deniliquin on the Opening Day, 4 July 1876
Type and origin
- Power type: Steam
- Designer: Beyer, Peacock & Co., Manchester, England
- Builder: Beyer, Peacock & Co., Manchester, England & Phoenix Foundry, Ballarat, Australia
- Order number: Pattern engine: 3003
- Build date: 1874–1885
- Total produced: 23
- Rebuild date: 1901–1906
- Number rebuilt: 22 out of 23
Specifications
- Configuration
  - Whyte: 0-6-0
- Driver: 2nd coupled axle
- Coupled dia.: 4 ft 3 in (1,300 mm)
- Wheelbase: 15 ft 4 in (4,670 mm) (engine only)
  - Coupled: 15 ft 4 in
- Frame type: Plate
- Fuel type: Coal
- Fuel capacity: Unknown (pattern), 3.5 long tons (3.6 t) (Phoenix), 4.2 long tons (4.3 t) (ex W)
- Water cap.: Unknown (pattern), 1,915 imp gal (8,710 L) (Phoenix); 2,600 imp gal (12,000 L) (rebuilt); 2,100 imp gal (9,500 L) (ex W)
- Firebox
  - Type: Round top
- Boiler pressure: 130 psi (900 kPa) (original); 140 psi (970 kPa) (T281); 160 psi (1,100 kPa) (reboilered engines)
- Safety valve: Salter (original), Ramsbottom (reboilered)
- Heating surface
  - Firebox: 76.76 sq ft (7.131 m^{2}), later 72.40 sq ft (6.726 m^{2})
  - Tubes: 771.34 sq ft (71.660 m^{2}), later 792.70 sq ft (73.644 m^{2})
  - Total surface: 848.10 sq ft (78.791 m^{2}), later 865.10 sq ft (80.370 m^{2})
- Cylinders: 2
- Cylinder size: 16.5 in × 20 in (420 mm × 510 mm)
Performance figures
- Tractive effort: 10,676 lbf (47,490 N) original (at 75%), 13,665 lbf (60,780 N) rebuilt (at 80%)
Career
- Numbers: D&MR 1–4, 125 & 249–283 (odds only, VR), later 90–96
- Delivered: 1874–1885
- Withdrawn: 1915–1953
- Preserved: 1

The 23 Victorian Railways T class locomotives were built from 1874 as a light lines goods engine.

== History ==
In 1874 the Victorian Railways imported two pattern engines from Beyer, Peacock & Co. (Manchester)—a passenger type 2-4-0, and a goods type 0-6-0. Respectively, on arrival these became the Victorian Railways' engines 98 and 125. The engines shared many components, essentially being variants on the theme as was common practice at the time. While no further engines of these types were initially ordered by the Victorian Railways, the newly-formed Deniliquin and Moama Railway Company (D&MR) appreciated the goods design and placed orders for two identical units in 1875, followed by a third in 1876 and a fourth in 1878. These four units had larger timber cabins to provide improved crew comfort, and six-wheel tenders were fitted with 3.5 long tons (3.6 t) coal and 1,915 imp gal (8,710 L) water capacity. The engines operating on the D&MR were fired with local redgum instead of coal, and at least No. 4 was fitted with a diamond-shaped funnel with a screen to reduce the chance of lineside fires caused by cinders.

A decade later Solomon Mirls, the newly appointed Locomotive Superintendent of the Victorian Railways, suggested that the Victorian Government let tenders for a further 18 engines based on the design of No. 125, with slight modifications taking into account lessons learned. Phoenix Foundry, who had since constructed copies of the passenger-type engine, won the contract and delivered additional goods engines through 1884–1885 as odd numbers 249 to 283. In the 1886 classification scheme the group became known as the T class. Phoenix Foundry's engines were a close match to the D&MR type, including the improved cab and extended tender designs. Where the pattern engine had been imported with a four-wheel tender, the new builds each had six-wheel tenders. Notably, the photo of T267 at Koondrook in Newsrail, March 1983 p.78, shows the engine with a taller, wider tender borrowed from engine D122, which had been sold to the D&MR in 1920.

By 1890, the class was allocated to a range of country depots including one each to Maryborough, Ballarat and Seymour, six each to Ararat and Benalla, and four to Stawell.

The original boilers fitted to both the T and F classes were raised, round-top with Salter safety valves mounted on the steam dome. These came due for replacement around the turn of the century, and between 1901 and 1906 all engines of both classes, except T281, were reboilered with a new design incorporating Ramsbottom safety valves and a boiler pressure of 160 psi (1,100 kPa), increased from 130 psi (900 kPa). The new boilers included a larger smoke box with a new three-piece funnel, using a cast-iron base and a copper cap. Additionally, the six-wheel 3.5 ton /1,915-gallon tenders had their sides extended, increasing water capacity to 2,600 imp gal (12,000 L). T281 retained its original boiler, but the pressure permitted was increased to 140 psi (970 kPa). Around the same time (give or take a few years) the original cylinders were also replaced.

However the engines had a limited life span from that point, as newer designs—particularly the DD series—eclipsed their power while providing better crew accommodation, longer range and more power. As such, engines were condemned and scrapped as they came due for major overhauls, with five scrapped in 1916 and most of the remainder over the following years. Two were sold; T279 in 1915 to Baxter & Saddler for track construction in South Australia, and T267 in 1921 to the Kerang and Koondrook Tramway. Four additional engines were acquired when the Victorian Railways purchased the Deniliquin and Moama Railway in 1923, but engines 1, 2 and 4 were all transported to Bendigo Workshops and broken up over the following eighteen months. D&MR No.3 lasted a little longer and was caught up in the 1924 engine renumbering scheme, becoming the new No.96 while 249, 251, 255, 259, 265 and 269 were allocated numbers 90 to 95, respectively. 90-ex-249, 259 and 269 were scrapped in 1926, followed by 91 and 96 in 1927.

On the Kerang and Koondrook Tramway, T267 was unofficially named "Bucking Kate" until withdrawn in 1951 and returned to the Victorian Railways. Details are not presently available on the fate of T279.

In 1933 the two remaining Government engines, 92 and 94, had their central driving wheel flanges removed (retaining the outer sets), and the engines were coupled to new tenders recovered from scrapped Baldwin W class engines; these had a fixed axle at the engine end and a bogie at the trailing end, making them ideal for shunting around tight radius curves in the Newport Power Station vicinity. These engines retained their three-piece funnels until the 1940s when they were replaced with a simpler stovepipe type. As the only engines suited to the job the two continued in service for another 18 years, before finally being superseded by SEC diesels from 1952. They were both withdrawn in 1953 and T92 was scrapped. T94 was retained and cosmetically restored for the 1954 Victorian Railways centenary, being displayed at Spencer Street Station in its original lined Brunswick green livery and with a funnel taken from a withdrawn ^{N}A locomotive. After the celebrations, it was placed into long term storage. In January 1962, it was donated to the then-new ARHS Museum at Newport, becoming one of the first exhibits. Sometime after, the centenary funnel was swapped with a larger-diameter one from 12A, possibly during the latter engine's restoration.

== Class table ==
1st No	2nd No	When?	Builder	Builder's No	Date in service	Date reboilered	Date off register	Notes
125	-	-	Beyer, Peacock & Co.	1268	1874-06-xx	1906-12-xx	1918-07-23	
249	90	?	Phoenix Foundry Co.	136	1884-09-xx	1902-08-xx	1926-12-06	
251	91	1924-09-27	Phoenix Foundry Co.	137	1884-10-03	1902-08-xx	1927-11-15	
253	-	-	Phoenix Foundry Co.	138	1884-10-14	1905-07-xx	1919-05-10	
255	92	1923-06-28	Phoenix Foundry Co.	139	1884-10-29	1905-01-xx	1951-03-13	Modified with flangeless wheels and coupled to W class tender for tight curves.
257	-	-	Phoenix Foundry Co.	140	1884-11-10	1905-07-xx	1920-03-20	Newsrail notes scrap date as 1920-10-xx.
259	-	-	Phoenix Foundry Co.	141	1884-11-19	1905-11-xx	1926-01-26	
261	-	-	Phoenix Foundry Co.	142	1884-11-25	1902-04-xx	1916-01-24	
263	-	-	Phoenix Foundry Co.	143	1884-12-03	1903-09-xx	1917-08-11	
265	94	1924-12-06	Phoenix Foundry Co.	144	1884-12-11	1901-11-xx	1951-03-30	Modified with flangeless wheels and coupled to W class tender for tight curves. Preserved 1/1962
267	-	-	Phoenix Foundry Co.	145	1884-12-11	1905-05-xx	1921-11-18	Sold to Kerang & Koondrook Tramway. Returned to VR in 1952 and quickly scrapped.
269	-	-	Phoenix Foundry Co.	146	1884-12-23	1901-12-xx	1926-01-30	
271	-	-	Phoenix Foundry Co.	147	1885-01-03	1902-04-xx	1916-11-08	
273	-	-	Phoenix Foundry Co.	148	1885-01-15	1905-01-xx	1919-05-10	
275	-	-	Phoenix Foundry Co.	149	1885-01-23	1902-09-xx	1916-07-19	
277	-	-	Phoenix Foundry Co.	150	1885-02-03	1903-11-xx	1917-08-11	
279	-	-	Phoenix Foundry Co.	151	1885-02-10	1903-12-xx	1915-03-31	Sold to Baxter & Saddler for railway construction in South Australia
281	-	-	Phoenix Foundry Co.	152	1885-01-31	n/a	1916-01-24	Instead of a new boiler, the existing boiler pressure was increased from 130psi to 140psi
283	-	-	Phoenix Foundry Co.	153	1885-01-31	1902-04-xx	1916-11-03	
1	-	-	Beyer, Peacock & Co.	1588	1875-xx-xx	n/a	1925-05-30	Purchased with Deniliquin & Moama Railway Company, 1 December 1923
2	-	-	Beyer, Peacock & Co.	1589	1875-xx-xx	n/a	1925-05-30	Purchased with Deniliquin & Moama Railway Company, 1 December 1923
3	96	1925-03-07	Beyer, Peacock & Co.	1664	1876-xx-xx	n/a	1927-09-15	Purchased with Deniliquin & Moama Railway Company, 1 December 1923
4	-	-	Beyer, Peacock & Co.	1735	1878-xx-xx	n/a	1925-05-30	Purchased with Deniliquin & Moama Railway Company, 1 December 1923
