= Victorian Railways AA class =

Class of Australian 4-4-0 steam locomotives

Victorian Railways A^{A} Class
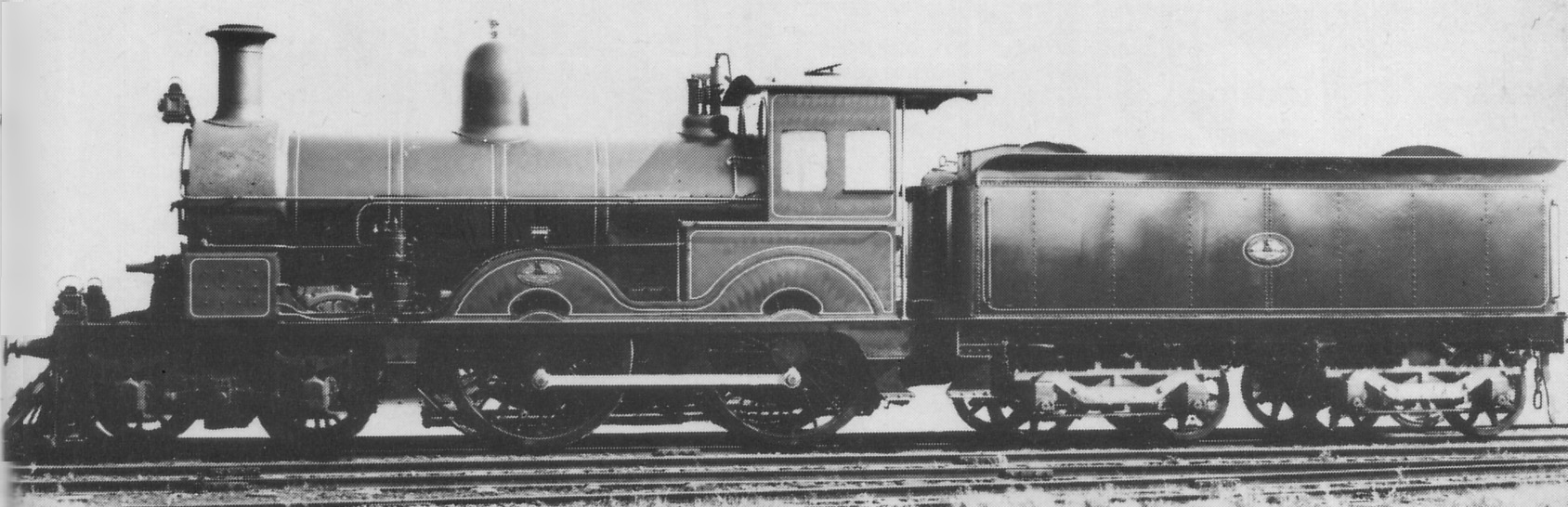
Type and origin
- Power type: steam
- Designer: Eugene Siepen
- Builder: Phoenix Foundry, Ballarat
- Build date: 1900–1903
Specifications
- Configuration
  - Whyte: 4-4-0
  - UIC: 2'Bh2
- Gauge: 5 ft 3 in (1,600 mm)
- Driver dia.: 6 ft 1 in (1.854 m)
- Adhesive weight: 32 long tons (33 t; 36 short tons) (roadworthy)
- Tender weight: 41.2 long tons (41.9 t; 46.1 short tons)
- Total weight: 91.1 long tons (92.6 t; 102.0 short tons)
- Firebox
  - Grate area: 23 sq ft (2.1 m^{2})
- Boiler pressure: 200 psi (1,379 kPa)
- Heating surface: 1,439 sq ft (133.7 m^{2})
- Cylinders: Two, inside
- Cylinder size: 19 in × 26 in (483 mm × 660 mm)
- Valve gear: Stephenson
- Valve type: piston valves
Performance figures
- Tractive effort: 20,850 lbf (92.75 kN) at 80% WP MEP
Career
- First run: 1900
- Last run: 1932
- Disposition: All scrapped

The A^{A} class was an express passenger locomotive that ran on the Victorian Railways between 1900 and 1932. The largest, heaviest and most powerful 4-4-0 steam locomotive to run in Australia, it was the final development of this locomotive type in Australia.

== History ==
In 1900, Victorian Railways still ran express passenger trains with the successful but ageing B class 2-4-0 which dated back to 1862. The 'New A' class 4-4-0 of 1889 had proven to be a successful design, as had its close cousin and exact contemporary the X class 0-6-0. With traffic needs continuing to grow, the VR drafting office decided to take the best features of the New A and X class, but enlarge the locomotive with a larger, higher pressure boiler and larger cylinders.

=== Design features ===
Innovative design features of the A^{A} class included air sanding equipment, improved Gresham No. 9 injectors, horizontal grid spark arrestors, steam for auxiliaries supplied directly from the dome, and a sloped ashpan to provide easier cleaning.

With a comparatively high 185 pounds per square inch (1,280 kPa) boiler, later increased to 200 pounds per square inch (1,400 kPa), it was considered impractical to use traditional slide valves. A trial installation of overhead piston valves on New A class locomotive No. 422 demonstrated considerably greater efficiency and reduced maintenance, and the A^{A} became the first of many subsequent VR locomotive classes to be built with piston valves.

With an axle load of 16.85 long tons (17.12 t; 18.87 short tons), the A^{A} had reached the design limits of size and power possible with a two-coupled axle locomotive type with Victoria's relatively lightweight track infrastructure. Its high tractive effort and limited adhesive weight (due to axle load constraints and having only two powered axles) combined to produce a less-than-ideal factor of adhesion of 3.5. Future VR locomotive designs were based on three or four coupled axles.

=== Production ===
Twenty of the class were built by the Phoenix Foundry in Ballarat, entering service between 1900 and 1903. The first batch of ten, delivered in 1900–01, had a traditional three-axle tender. The second batch had a slightly larger firebox and grate, 200 psi (1,379 kPa) boiler pressure, and larger, four-axle tenders.

=== Service life ===
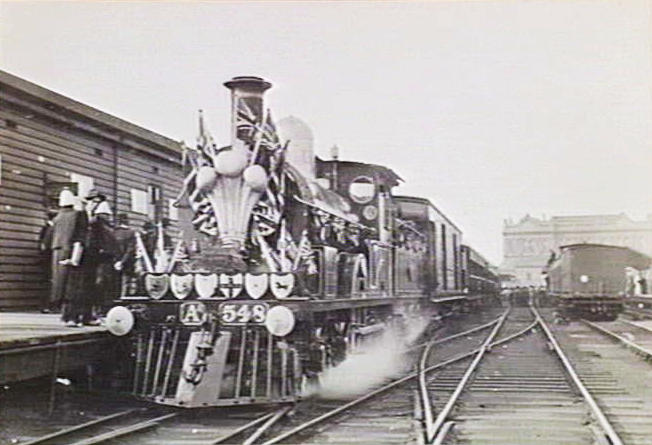
Locomotive A^{A} 548 decorated for a Royal Train in 1901

Upon introduction in 1900, the A^{A} went into service on mainline passenger service, hauling key express services such as the Sydney Express. They were chosen to haul the Royal Train of the Duke and Duchess of Cornwall in 1901.

With the introduction of larger, heavier express passenger rolling stock in the form of the E type carriages of 1906, the VR introduced the considerably more powerful A2 class 4-6-0 in 1907, which superseded the A^{A} class on premier services. However, the A^{A} continued in service in assistant duties, as well as hauling show and race train specials.

=== Design improvements ===
The A^{A} class inherited a number of design improvements from the Dd class mixed-traffic locomotives which were introduced in 1902.

The second batch of A^{A} locomotives utilised a bogie tender design based on that of the Dd in place of the original six wheel design, offering a far greater water capacity.

During 1923–24, Nos. 542, 544, 566 and 570 were fitted with Robinson superheaters, based on the successful trial of Schmidt pattern superheaters on Dd 882. As was common VR practice at the time for locomotives converted to superheating, the boiler pressure was reduced - in this case to 175 pounds per square inch (1.21 MPa) - to reduce maintenance and prolong boiler life. Nominal tractive effort was reduced to a quoted 19,131 lbf (85.10 kN) at 85% boiler pressure, with total weight rising to 92.95 long tons (94.44 t; 104.10 short tons).

Another key improvement was the fitting of tablet exchangers to No. 552 and 570 for non-stop running on single-track sections of the North-eastern line, a portent of improvements on this line that would eventually lead to the non-stop Melbourne-Albury Spirit of Progress service of 1937.

=== Accidents ===
Three A^{A} class locomotives were involved in the Sunshine rail disaster of 1908, when an Up Bendigo service hauled by A^{A} 564 and 544 crashed into the rear of an Up Ballarat excursion service hauled by A^{A} 534 and 'Old A' 202, resulting in the deaths of 44 people and the injury of over 400.

=== Withdrawal and scrapping ===
The A^{A} class was gradually made redundant by the delivery of large numbers of 4-6-0 locomotives of the new Dd and A2 classes between 1902 and 1922, which eventually totalled 446 locomotives. The A2 offered considerably more power, while the Dd offered similar tractive effort to the A^{A} but much greater route availability due to its lower axle load.

Withdrawals commenced in 1919 and, by 1926, only the superheated A^{A} locomotives remained on the register. A number of the boilers of the withdrawn locomotives saw further use powering riverboats, while A^{A} 532 served as a mobile boiler at Newport Workshops.

By January 1932, the entire class had been recorded as withdrawn. They were all scrapped shortly after withdrawal, with the exception of Newport Workshops boiler locomotive A^{A} 532, which lasted until 1940.
