= Victorian Railways D class (1887) =

- Unknown D Class photographed at Newport Workshops.
Type and origin
- Power type: Steam
- Builder: Phoenix Foundry
- Serial number: 200-219
- Build date: 1887-1888
- Total produced: 20
Specifications
- Configuration
  - Whyte: 4-4-0
- Gauge: 5 ft 3 in (1,600 mm)
- Leading dia.: 3 ft 6 in (1,070 mm)
- Driver dia.: 5 ft 0 in (1,520 mm)
- Wheelbase: 40 ft 2 in (12.24 m)
- Length: 49 ft 2 1/2 in (14.999 m)
- Height: 12 ft 9 1/2 in (3.899 m)
- Axle load: 13 long tons 13 cwt (30,600 lb or 13.9 t)
- Loco weight: 39 long tons 11 cwt (88,600 lb or 40.2 t)
- Tender weight: 29 long tons 19 cwt (67,100 lb or 30.4 t)
- Total weight: 69 long tons 10 cwt (155,700 lb or 70.6 t)
- Fuel type: Coal
- Fuel capacity: 70 long cwt (7,800 lb or 3,600 kg)
- Water cap.: 2,200 imp gal (10,000 L; 2,600 US gal)
- Heating surface
  - Firebox: 83.5 sq ft (7.76 m^{2})
  - Tubes: 971.0 sq ft (90.21 m^{2})
  - Total surface: 1,054.5 sq ft (98 m^{2})
- Cylinders: 2, outside
- Cylinder size: 17 in × 26 in (432 mm × 660 mm)
Performance figures
- Tractive effort: 12,523 lbf (55.71 kN)
Career
- Operators: Victorian Railways
- Number in class: 20
- Numbers: 82, 92, 122, 190, 191, 194, 242, 244, 248, 250, 260, 322 - 344 (even only)
- First run: 17 November 1887
- Disposition: All scrapped

The D class of 1887 were Phoenix-built 4-4-0 steam locomotive to be used on Victorian Railways.

== History ==
In the mid-1880s Richard Speight, the Victorian Railways chairman of commissioners, instituted a policy of standardised locomotive designs for new builds. This was intended to reduce maintenance costs and repair downtime, and was achieved by designing five new classes of locomotive - Main line passenger and goods, light lines passenger and goods, and suburban tank engines - which shared among them as many components as possible, reducing the range and quantity of spare parts required and allowing engines undergoing repair to swap out components as needed. These classes later became the New A, New R, D, Y and E classes respectively; the latter two having been based on pattern engines from Kitson & Co. at Leeds in England, and all designs "bearing similarities to contemporary locomotives on the Midland Railway."

Using the range of designs provided by Jeffreys, of the Monkbridge Iron and Steel Company of Leeds, twenty D Class engines were constructed at Phoenix Foundry, with builders numbers 200 to 219, entering service in 1887 and 1888. The engine numbers were 242, 244, 248, 250 and 260, from withdrawn ex-South Suburban tank engines, the even numbers of the range 322 to 344, and finally 82 and 92, recycled from engines destroyed at Little River in 1884, and 122, from an engine sold in 1888.

The necessary design drawings were nearing completion by the end of January 1887, and construction of some of the framing and castings had started in March.

Engine D242 was the 200th locomotive built by Phoenix Foundry. The engine was delivered from the Ballarat works on Friday 21 October 1888, and made a test run to Lal Lal the following day.

D92 was put on display at the Melbourne Centennial Exhibition in 1888, alongside the pattern Kitson E and Y Class engines; those two were named Tasmania and Victoria respectively, and later became Victorian Railways engines E426 and Y445 (later again, Y121), but D92 was not given a name for the event.

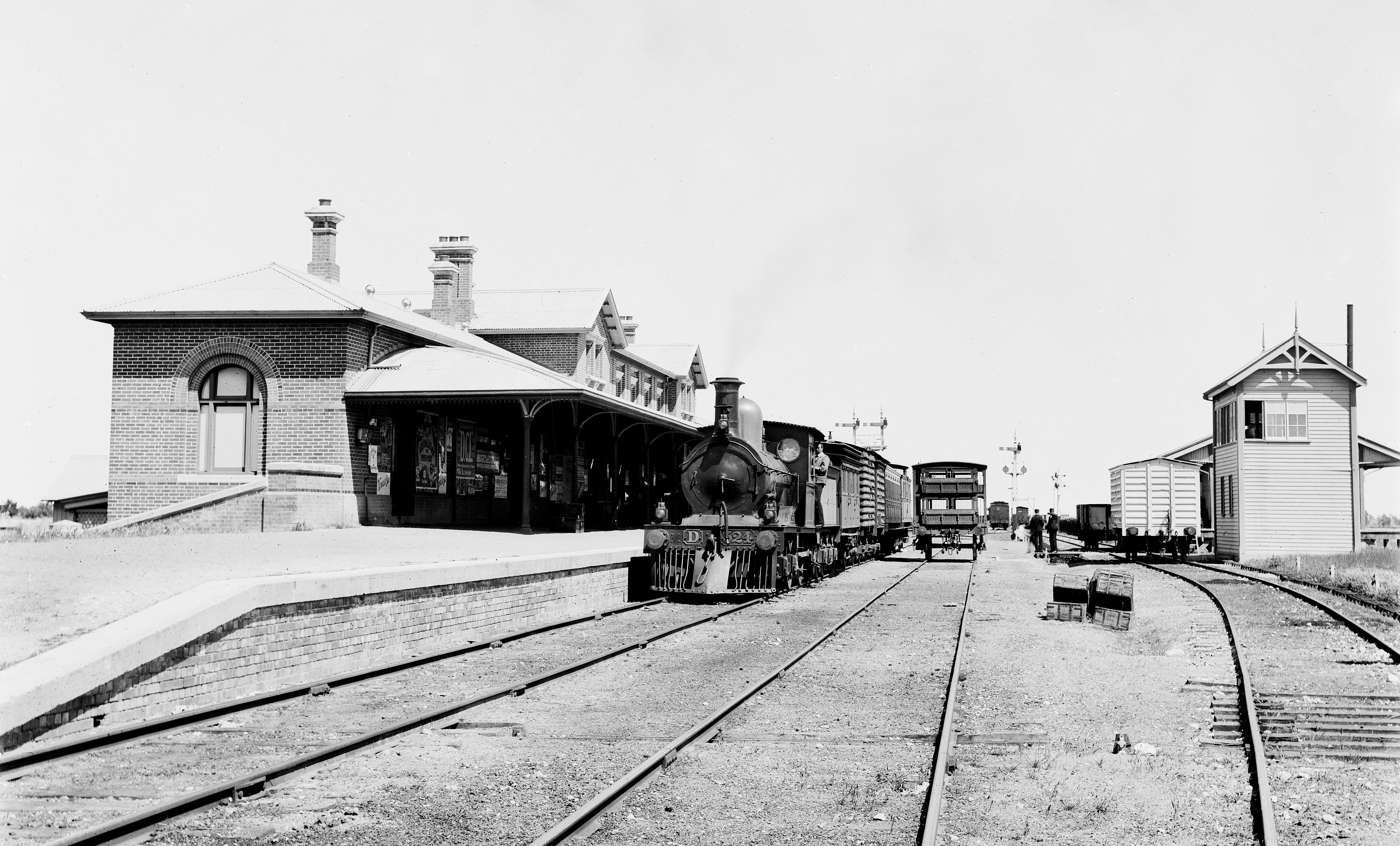
D324 at Serviceton station c.1910s

== Design ==
The engines were fairly standard for the era, with inside cylinders worked by Stephenson link gear, a round-top firebox and the same tender as the other standard classes (except that the Y Class tenders had a compensating beam between the leading and centre axles). New features included a drop-door for the firebox in lieu of the older sliding door type, which became the default for all locomotives built over the following forty years, a double-ended regulator handle, and the leading bogie was noted as an "outside frame swing link type with equalisers between the springs, much more suitable for passenger service than the Bissel truck of the Beyer, Peacock 4-4-0s."

== Upgrades ==
From 1899 some engines were fitted with repaired New A class boilers in lieu of the original 140psi boilers. Later, between 1907 and 1909, the boilers were replaced with high pressure boilers from the New A and Y Classes, reduced from the nominal 175psi to 160psi to account for the low factor of adhesion of the light-lines engines, but even with this change the upgraded engines were prone to wheelslip. To rectify this, half the class were fitted with drag boxes under the cab floor, increasing weight by nearly three tons. These new boilers had a taller firebox, requiring alterations to the cab and a modified smoke-box with a shorter chimney.

== In Service ==
While the D Class locomotives were intended for light lines passenger working, in practice they proved to have too high an axle load and thus could not be used in that role. They were instead confined to mainline operations through the mid-1890s, until the lighter lines could be upgraded to suit. Cave, et al. notes that in the early 1890s, common duties were on the main Gippsland line and double-heading on the Adelaide Express, and that in 1894, "two were allocated to Bendigo, three to Ballarat, five to Stawell, one to Geelong [working Queenscliff branch and Colac mixed services] and nine to the Princes Bridge depot in Melbourne". Because of their higher than intended axle load they never did completely fulfil the role of branch line passenger engines.

The engines entered service in the bright green livery with polished brass, but were later repainted into the Canadian Red livery.

== Renumbering and Disposal ==
Engine 122 was sold to the Kerang-Koondrook tramway in 1920 and remained in service on that line until after it was re-absorbed into the Victorian Railways fleet, finally being scrapped in January 1952. (Cave et al. notes that the number plate of the locomotive used a seriphed "I" rather than a "1".)

In 1922 the Victorian Railways undertook an extensive renumbering of its entire locomotive fleet, and the remaining D Class engines were allocated numbers 185 to 189. However, withdrawals were also happening around this time, and so only engines 328, 330 and 340 were actually renumbered, becoming 190, 191 and 194 respectively. All engines were scrapped, with engine D194 the last in service with the Victorian Railways until being withdrawn in November 1928.

The D Class engines were generally supplanted by the later D^{D} locomotives.
