= Victorian Railways Y class =

Class of Australian 0-6-0 steam locomotives

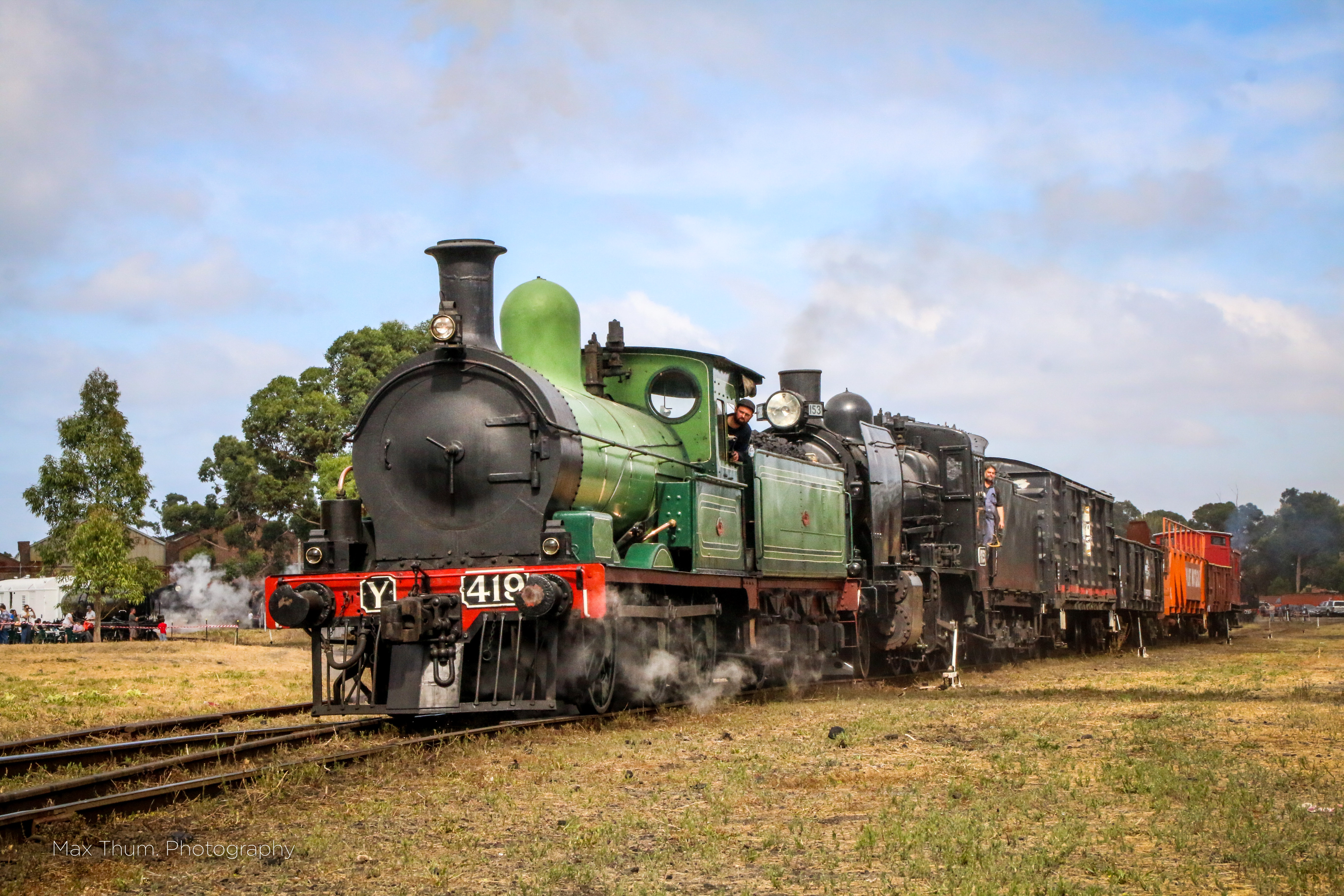
- Y419 (Y112) and K153 at Newport Workshops in 2018
Type and origin
- Power type: Steam
- Builder: Kitson & Co. (1); Phoenix Foundry (30)
- Build date: 1885, 1888-1889
Specifications
- Configuration
  - Whyte: 0-6-0
- Gauge: 1,600 mm (5 ft 3 in)
- Driver dia.: 54 in (1,400 mm)
- Length: 60 ft 5 1/2 in (18.43 m)
- Axle load: 14.5 long tons (14.7 t; 16.2 short tons)
- Adhesive weight: 57.35 long tons (58.27 t; 64.23 short tons)
- Loco weight: 66.95 long tons (68.02 t; 74.98 short tons)
- Tender weight: 45.8 long tons (46.5 t; 51.3 short tons)
- Total weight: 112.75 long tons (114.56 t; 126.28 short tons)
- Fuel type: Coal
- Fuel capacity: 5 long tons (5.1 t)
- Water cap.: 2,200 imp gal (10,000 L)
- Cylinders: 2
- Cylinder size: 18 in × 26 in (457 mm × 660 mm)
Performance figures
- Maximum speed: 40 mph (64 km/h)
- Tractive effort: 21,840 lbf (97.1 kN)
Career
- Operators: Victorian Railways
- Number in class: 31
- Numbers: Original: 383–441, 445 (odd numbers); 1940 renumbering: 100–109, 111–112, 114–121
- Preserved: Y108, Y109, Y112
- Disposition: 3 preserved, 28 scrapped

The Victorian Railways Y class is a class of 0-6-0 steam locomotives.

== History ==
The Y class was an example of the new policy of standard design principles being adopted by the railways of the time. The original locomotive (an 0-6-0 tender engine) was built by Kitson & Co. at Leeds in England in 1885, and was exhibited, along with E426, in 1888 at the Melbourne Centennial Exhibition, held in the Melbourne Exhibition Building.

The other 30 locomotives of this type were built by the Phoenix Foundry at Ballarat in 1888–1889. They were given road numbers 383 to 441 (odd numbers only), and the Kitson engine No.445 as No.443 having been allotted to an "Old" R class. They were big locomotives for their time—in fact the largest and most powerful 0-6-0s to run in Australia. The class excelled in their performance and acceptance by crews. They were often seen on suburban passenger trains prior to electrification, finishing their lives as yard shunters. Notably, the Kitson engine was not the pattern, because the Phoenix engines were already under construction before it arrived in Melbourne.

== Renumbering ==
The class's first renumbering took place in the mid-1920s, when the Victorian Railways' unique odds/evens system for goods and passenger engines was replaced by a more traditional class-number structure. In this instance, the odd-numbered engines 383 to 399 were renumbered to even numbers 400-416, giving a consecutive Y Class sequence of 400-417 then odd numbers only 419-441 and 445.

The second renumbering took place in the early 1950s, with the remaining locomotives consolidated into the group Y100 to Y1109, Y111 to Y112, and Y114 to Y120. Y121 was the Kitson engine, formerly Y445, and numbers Y110, Y113 and Y122 through Y132 were former RY class locomotives.

== Demise ==
Withdrawal of the Y class began in 1926, and only 20 were still in service when renumbered in 1940. The last in regular service was No. 108 which was withdrawn in 1963 after being a pilot engine at North Melbourne for many years.

Y109 (originally Y413) was taken off the register 23 December 1954 and frame and wheels sold to the Brunswick Plaster Mills Pty. Ltd, which rebuilt it into a diesel-mechanical locomotive, to work the Millewa South Railway from Nowingi to Raak Plain in north-western Victoria. It carried the number Y413 for some of the time it operated in that form.

Y106 was one of the last in service, but by August 1960 it was relegated to the yard pilot duties at Ballarat East locomotive depot with multiple components absent, such as the compressor, steam dome cover and boiler shell coverings. Its last known use was on 2 September 1960, and by that stage the coupling rods between the middle and rear driving wheels had been removed, rendering the engine as an 0-4-2. It was intended to be preserved at a private museum in Warrenheip, but those negotiations failed and it was scrapped at Ballarat North.

== Preservation ==
Y108 is on static display at the Newport Railway Museum.

Y109/Y413 was acquired by Steamrail Victoria in the 1980s and moved to Ballarat East Locomotive Depot, where parts were used in the restoration of Y112. The remains were acquired by the Australian Railway Historical Society and donated to the Millewa Pioneer Park at Meringur in 2008.

Y112 was withdrawn from service in 1961 and stored at Newport Workshops awaiting scrapping until 1966, when Bill Roff, in dual roles of the Mayor of Ballarat and President of the Ballarat Historical Society, arranged for the engine to be transferred to Ballarat and was preserved on a plinth outside the Ballarat railway station. During its time on the plinth the engine featured a single smoke box door handle rather than two, because scrapping had already started when the engine was rescued. When the restoration started, the welded-shut firebox door was removed, and the original steam gauge, various handles and other components were discovered stored in the firebox. It was purchased by the Ballarat Historical Society and is now owned by Ballarat's Sovereign Hill Museum. The locomotive was leased to Steamrail Victoria and restored to operational condition with the help of West Coast Railway. It was returned to service in 1996 and operates occasional rail tours.
