= Durban Harbour's Edward Innes =

Type of steam locomotive

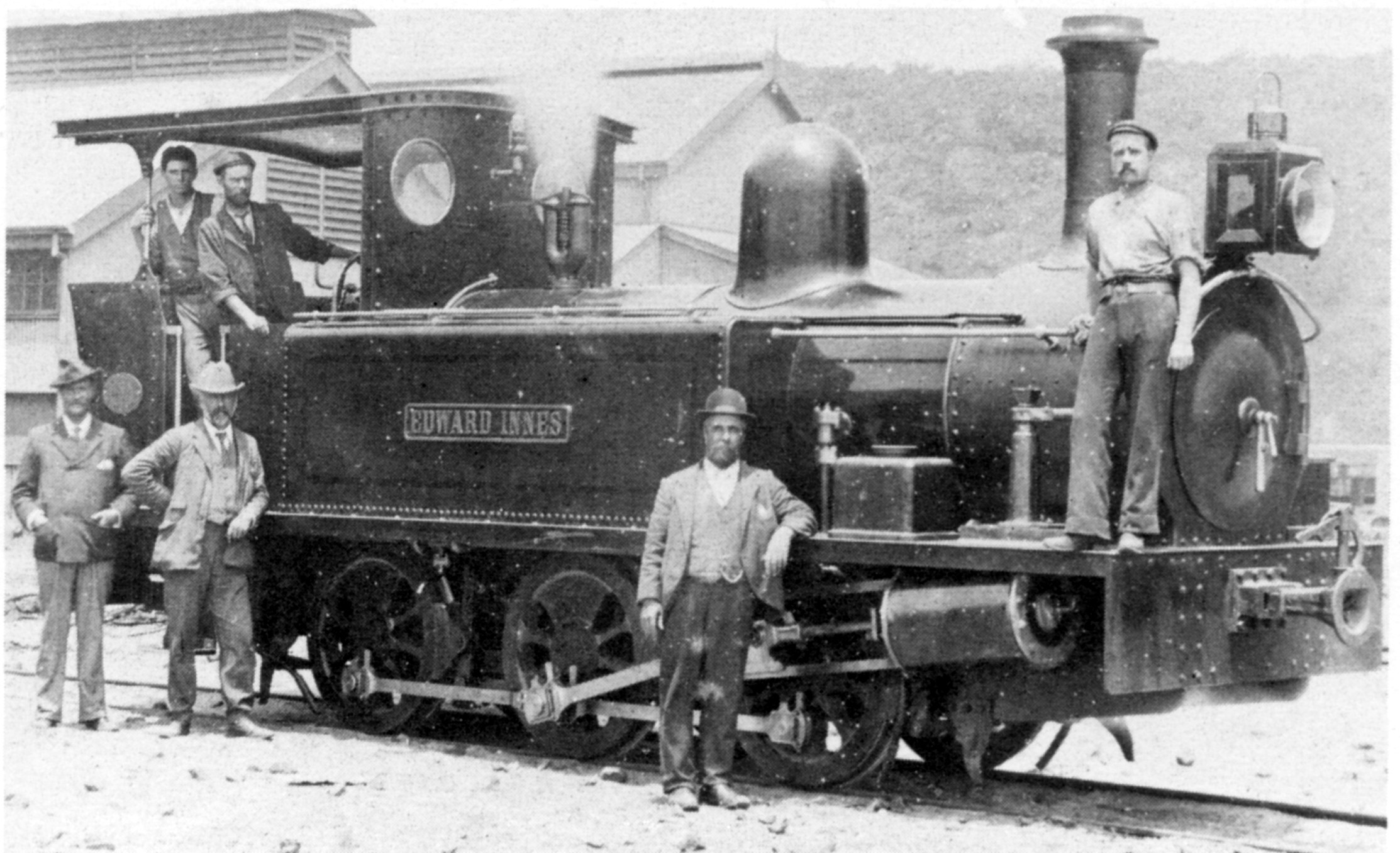
- Natal Harbours Department's Edward Innes, c. 1901
Type and origin
- Power type: Steam
- Designer: Hudswell, Clarke and Co.
- Builder: Hudswell, Clarke and Co.
- Serial number: 600
- Build date: 1901
Specifications
- Configuration
  - Whyte: 0-6-0T (Six-coupled)
  - UIC: Cn2t
- Driver: 2nd coupled axle
- Gauge: 3 ft 6 in (1,067 mm) Cape gauge
- Coupled dia.: 37 in (940 mm)
- Wheelbase: 9 ft (2,743 mm)
- Length
  - Over couplers: 24 ft 7 in (7,493 mm)
  - Over beams: 21 ft 7 in (6,579 mm)
- Height: 10 ft 6 1/4 in (3,207 mm)
- Adhesive weight: 18 LT 18 cwt 2 qtr (19,230 kg)
- Loco weight: 18 LT 18 cwt 2 qtr (19,230 kg)
- Fuel type: Coal
- Fuel capacity: 2 LT (2.0 t)
- Water cap.: 571 imp gal (2,600 L)
- Firebox
  - Type: Round-top
  - Grate area: 8.82 sq ft (0.819 m^{2})
- Boiler
  - Pitch: 5 ft 3 1/4 in (1,607 mm)
  - Diameter: 3 ft 3 in (991 mm) outside
  - Small tubes: 102: 1 3/4 in (44 mm)
- Boiler pressure: 160 psi (1,103 kPa)
- Safety valve: Ramsbottom
- Heating surface
  - Firebox: 53.12 sq ft (4.935 m^{2})
  - Tubes: 403.74 sq ft (37.509 m^{2})
  - Total surface: 456.86 sq ft (42.444 m^{2})
- Cylinders: Two
- Valve gear: Stephenson
- Couplers: Johnston link-and-pin
Performance figures
- Tractive effort: 8,410 lbf (37.4 kN) @ 75%
Career
- Operators: Harbours Department of Natal; South African Railways
- Number in class: 1
- Official name: Edward Innes
- Delivered: 1901
- First run: 1901
- Withdrawn: 1923

Durban Harbour's Edward Innes of 1901 was a South African steam locomotive from the pre-Union era in the Colony of Natal.

In 1901, the Harbours Department of the Natal Government placed a single 0-6-0 side-tank locomotive named Edward Innes in service as harbour shunting engine in Durban Harbour.

== Port Advisory Board ==
When the Harbour Board of Natal was abolished in 1894, control over harbour development and maintenance was vested in a newly established government department of the Colony of Natal. In 1898, a Port Advisory Board was established, consisting of seven members representing the Colonial Government as well as commercial and municipal entities. Like the Harbour Boards in the Cape of Good Hope, this board was responsible for the management, control, improvement, development and maintenance of the facilities at Durban Harbour.

Railway operations in the harbour became the responsibility of the Harbours Department of the Government of Natal.

== Manufacturer ==
In 1901, the Natal Harbours Department placed a single 0-6-0T locomotive in service at Durban Harbour. It was built by Hudswell, Clarke and Company of Leeds and was not numbered, but named Edward Innes after the first harbour engineer who had been appointed by the Harbour Board of Natal in 1881. Innes had held the post until his death in 1887. The locomotive was not of a specially designed type, but was bought off the shelf and similar engines saw service elsewhere in the world.

== Service ==
When the Union of South Africa was established on 31 May 1910, the three Colonial government railways (Cape Government Railways, Natal Government Railways and Central South African Railways) were united under a single administration to control and administer the railways, ports and harbours of the Union. Although the South African Railways and Harbours came into existence in 1910, the actual classification and renumbering of all the rolling stock of the three constituent railways were only implemented with effect from 1 January 1912.

The engine Edward Innes was still in service at the harbour in 1912 and was taken onto the SAR roster. The locomotive was, however, excluded from the SAR classification and renumbering lists. It retained its name and remained in service at Durban Harbour until it was withdrawn from service and scrapped in 1923.
