= NGR Class K 0-6-0ST =

Type of steam locomotive

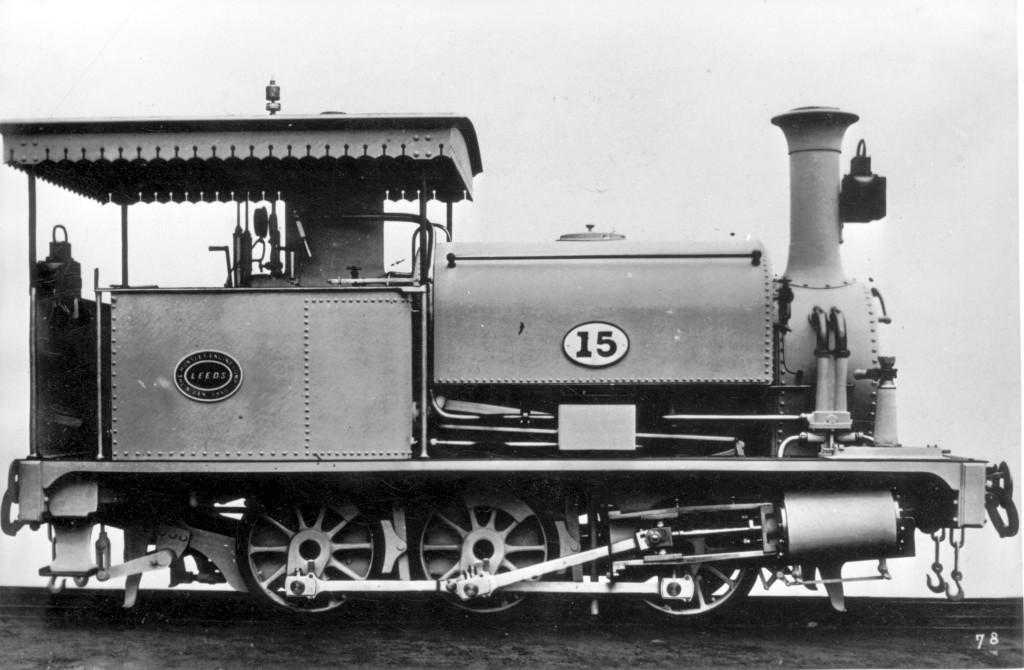
- NGR Class K locomotive no. 15, c. 1880
Type and origin
- Power type: Steam
- Designer: Hunslet Engine Company
- Builder: Hunslet Engine Company
- Serial number: 249
- Build date: 1880
Specifications
- Configuration
  - Whyte: 0-6-0ST (Six-coupled)
  - UIC: Cn2t
- Driver: 2nd coupled axle
- Gauge: 3 ft 6 in (1,067 mm) Cape gauge
- Coupled dia.: 36 in (914 mm)
- Wheelbase: 7 ft 6 in (2,286 mm)
  - Axle spacing (Asymmetrical): 1-2: 4 ft (1,219 mm); 2-3: 3 ft 6 in (1,067 mm)
- Length
  - Over couplers: 20 ft 11 in (6,375 mm)
  - Over beams: 18 ft 6 in (5,639 mm)
- Height: 10 ft 8 in (3,251 mm)
- Adhesive weight: 43,792 lb (19,864 kg)
- Loco weight: 43,792 lb (19,864 kg)
- Fuel type: Coal
- Fuel capacity: 15 long hundredweight (0.8 t)
- Water cap.: 450 imp gal (2,050 L)
- Firebox
  - Type: Round-top
  - Grate area: 7 sq ft (0.65 m^{2})
- Boiler
  - Pitch: 5 ft (1,524 mm)
  - Diameter: 3 ft 2 in (965 mm) outside
  - Tube plates: 7 ft 6 1/2 in (2,299 mm)
  - Small tubes: 97: 1 7/8 in (48 mm)
- Boiler pressure: 130 psi (896 kPa)
- Heating surface
  - Firebox: 39 sq ft (3.6 m^{2})
  - Tubes: 353 sq ft (32.8 m^{2})
  - Total surface: 392 sq ft (36.4 m^{2})
- Cylinders: Two
- Cylinder size: 12 in (305 mm) bore 18 in (457 mm) stroke
- Valve gear: Stephenson
- Couplers: Johnston link-and-pin
Performance figures
- Tractive effort: 7,020 lbf (31.2 kN) @ 75%
Career
- Operators: Natal Government Railways
- Class: Class K
- Number in class: 1
- Numbers: 15
- Delivered: 1880
- First run: 1880
- The 2nd coupled axle had flangeless wheels

The Natal Government Railways Class K 0-6-0ST of 1880 was a South African steam locomotive from the pre-Union era in the Colony of Natal.

In 1880, the Natal Government Railways placed a single 0-6-0 saddle-tank locomotive in service. It was virtually identical to the Harbour Board of Natal's locomotive John Milne of 1879 and was built by the same manufacturer. During 1905 or 1906, the locomotive was designated NGR Class K.

== Manufacturer ==
In 1880, the Natal Government Railways (NGR) placed an order for a single 0-6-0 saddle-tank locomotive with Hunslet Engine Company in Leeds. It was virtually identical to the engine John Milne which had been supplied to the Harbour Board of Natal from the same manufacturer in 1879, having been built to the same design, but with some differences in detail such as those visible on the sides of their respective smokeboxes. The locomotive was numbered 15 in the NGR number range, following on from the numbers allocated to the NGR's first batch of Kitson-built Class G 2-6-0T locomotives of 1879.

== Service ==
The NGR's no. 15 was still in service by 1909. During 1905 or 1906, a locomotive classification system was introduced on the NGR and no. 15 became part of Class K, which consisted of a potpourri of different tank locomotive types with different wheel arrangements. The Class included the 0-4-0ST locomotives of 1891 and the surviving three of the 2-6-0T locomotives of 1877.

== Disposition ==
It is not known whether the locomotive had been scrapped or sold by 1912. It was no longer in service when the South African Railways (SAR) renumbering and classification was implemented in 1912, since it does not appear in the classification and renumbering lists issued by the SAR Chief Mechanical Engineer in January 1912.
