= CGR 0-6-0T =

South African steam locomotive

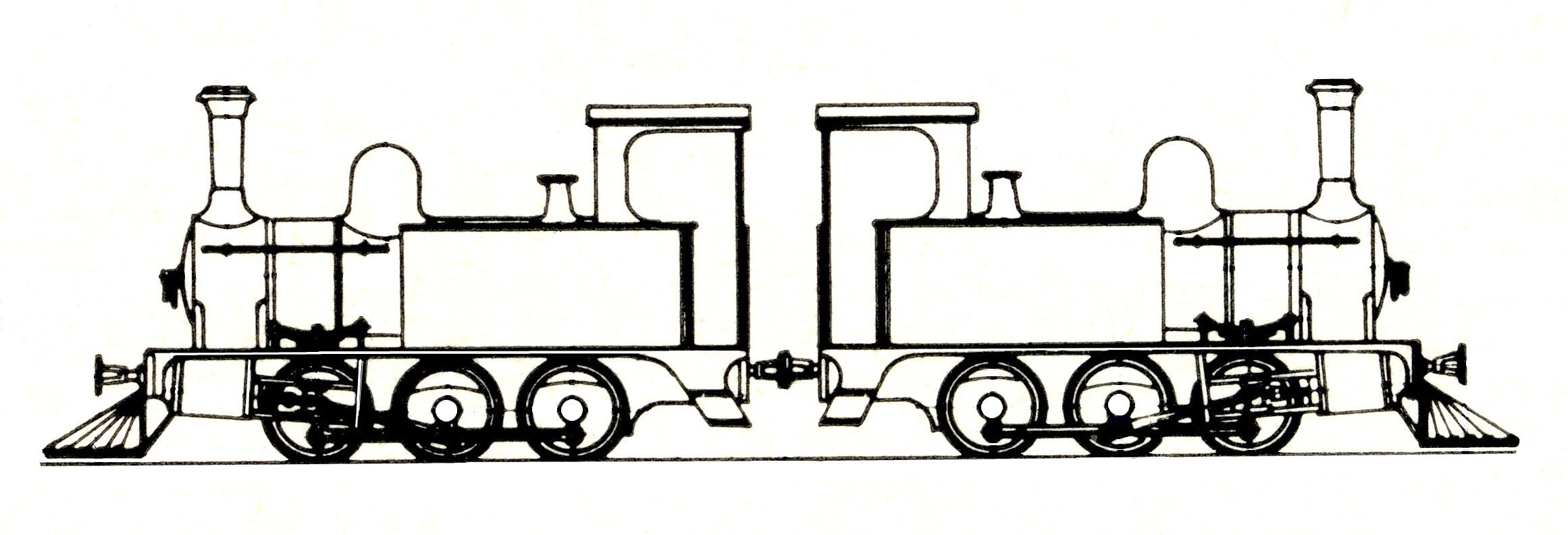
- Drawing of CGR 0-6-0T back-to-back locomotive pair
Type and origin
- Unless indicated otherwise, data is for a single engine
- Power type: Steam
- Designer: Robert Stephenson and Company
- Builder: Robert Stephenson and Company
- Serial number: 2257-2258, 2354
- Model: Stephenson's Patent back-to-back
- Build date: 1875, 1879
- Total produced: 3
Specifications
- Configuration
  - Whyte: 0-6-0T
  - UIC: Cn2t
- Driver: 2nd coupled axle
- Gauge: 3 ft 6 in (1,067 mm) Cape gauge
- Coupled dia.: 37 1/2 in (952 mm)
- Wheelbase: 29 ft (8,839 mm) (loco pair)
  - Coupled: 8 ft (2,438 mm)
- Length
  - Over couplers: 21 ft 4 in (6,502 mm)
- Height: 12 ft (3,658 mm)
- Axle load: 6 LT (6,096 kg)
- Loco weight: 18 LT (18,290 kg)
- Fuel type: Coal
- Firebox
  - Type: Round-top
  - Grate area: 10 sq ft (0.93 m^{2})
- Boiler
  - Pitch: 6 ft (1,829 mm)
- Boiler pressure: 125 psi (862 kPa)
- Heating surface
  - Firebox: 92 sq ft (8.5 m^{2})
  - Tubes: 850 sq ft (79 m^{2})
  - Total surface: 942 sq ft (87.5 m^{2})
- Cylinders: Two
- Cylinder size: 13 in (330 mm) bore 18 in (457 mm) stroke
- Valve gear: Stephenson
- Couplers: Johnston link-and-pin
Performance figures
- Tractive effort: 7,600 lbf (34 kN) @ 75%
Career
- Operators: Cape Government Railways
- Number in class: 3
- Numbers: E5-E7
- Delivered: 1876, 1879
- First run: 1876
- Withdrawn: 1912
- Scrapped: 1912

The Cape Government Railways 0-6-0T back-to-back of 1876 was a South African steam locomotive from the pre-Union era in the Cape of Good Hope.

In 1876 the Cape Government Railways placed a pair of Stephenson's Patent permanently coupled back-to-back 0-6-0T locomotives in service on its Eastern System. They worked out of East London in comparative trials with an experimental 0-6-0+0-6-0T Fairlie locomotive which was acquired in that same year.

A third single locomotive of the same design was delivered to the Eastern System in 1879.

== Manufacturer ==
To meet the requirement for more powerful locomotives on the Eastern System of the Cape Government Railways due to the heavy grades on the mainline which was being built out of East London, a pair of Stephenson's Patent permanently coupled back-to-back 0-6-0T locomotives was ordered from Robert Stephenson and Company in 1875, for experimental purposes. The locomotive pair was shipped on the vessel Claremont and arrived in East London on 1 February 1876, numbered E5 and E6 in the Eastern System's number range. A third single locomotive of the same class, numbered E7 and also built by Robert Stephenson, was delivered in 1879.

== Characteristics ==
The principle of using two tank locomotives which are permanently coupled at their cab ends was patented by Robert Stephenson and Company in 1855. The arrangement allowed the two locomotives to be operated by a single crew. Since each locomotive had separate regulators and reversers, they were also able to be used independently.

A similar arrangement was later used with the German-built Zwillinge locomotives which saw service on the military-built narrow gauge Feldbahn railway lines in German South West Africa and other German territories, where pairs of individual locomotives lettered A and B were semi-permanently coupled back-to-back.

== Locomotive trials ==
The locomotive pair was placed in service between East London and Belstone on the King William's Town line, where they were evaluated during comparative trials with the experimental CGR Fairlie 0-6-0+0-6-0 which was acquired at the same time.

The trials involved running the two types over 32 miles (51.5 kilometres) of finished track with an allowed time of 2 hours 40 minutes. This required an average speed of 12 miles per hour (19 kilometres per hour), with no time discount granted for watering stops, stops to allow steam pressure to build up or to attend to mechanical problems. The difference in altitude between the starting and terminal stations was 1,624.82 feet (495.25 metres), the sharpest curve was of 5 chains (101 metres) radius and the steepest gradient was 1 in 40. Each type took three trial trains, running alternately, and both types were worked by one driver and one fireman throughout the trials.

Like the Fairlie, the back-to-back engines performed well on curves. Unlike the Fairlie, however, any imperfections in the track affected them badly, especially while descending down a decline. The back-to-back engines lurched badly and, going down a decline, the trailing engine tended to jerk the leading engine from side to side so severely that power had to be applied to the leading engine in order to keep it steady.

While the poor quality coal from Indwe and Molteno, with a high ash content and a tendency to clinker, had an equally negative effect on the performance of both types, the Fairlie proved to be more economical on coal and water. Only two men were allowed to be working each type during the trials, but on the back-to-back engines this was found to be insufficient since both men were exhausted after the short 32 miles (51.5 kilometres) run.

Better results were obtained by separating the back-to-back engines and running them in the conventional double-heading manner with both locomotives facing in the same direction. The downside of this option, however, was that it required two crews.

== Service ==
It was eventually decided to separate the locomotives permanently, equip them with tenders and use them as shunting engines. In this configuration and application they performed well enough to remain in service until they were scrapped in 1912.

No photograph has yet been found of these locomotives.
