= CGR 0-6-0ST =

Class of two South African 0-6-0ST locomotives

East London Harbour 0-6-0ST CGR 0-6-0ST South African 0-6-0ST
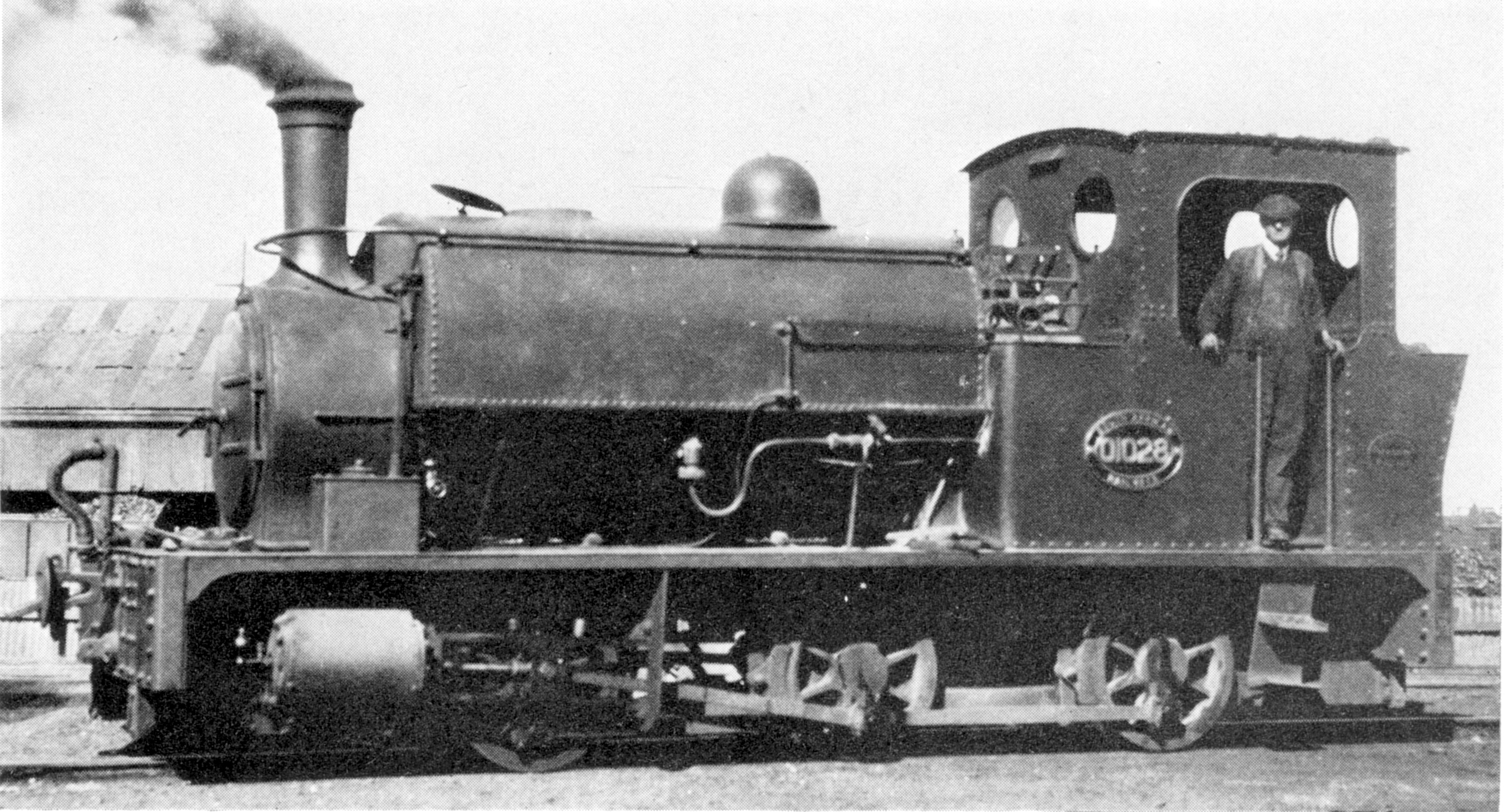
- East London Harbour no. 2, CGR no. 1028, SAR no. 01028, c. 1920
Type and origin
- Power type: Steam
- Designer: Hunslet Engine Company
- Builder: Hunslet Engine Company
- Serial number: 793–794
- Build date: 1902
- Total produced: 2
Specifications
- Configuration
  - Whyte: 0-6-0ST
  - UIC: Cn2t
- Driver: 2nd coupled axle
- Gauge: 3 ft 6 in (1,067 mm) Cape gauge
- Coupled dia.: 33 in (838 mm)
- Wheelbase: 10 ft 5 in (3,175 mm)
  - Axle spacing (Asymmetrical): 1-2: 5 ft 2 in (1,575 mm); 2-3: 5 ft 3 in (1,600 mm)
- Length
  - Over couplers: 23 ft 3 3/4 in (7,106 mm)
- Height: 10 ft 1 in (3,073 mm)
- Axle load: 8 LT 2 cwt (8,230 kg)
  - 1st coupled: 8 LT 2 cwt (8,230 kg)
  - 2nd coupled: 6 LT 5 cwt (6,350 kg)
  - 3rd coupled: 5 LT 7 cwt (5,436 kg)
- Adhesive weight: 20 LT 4 cwt (20,520 kg)
- Loco weight: 20 LT 4 cwt (20,520 kg)
- Fuel type: Coal
- Fuel capacity: 15 long hundredweight (0.8 t)
- Water cap.: 400 imp gal (1,820 L)
- Firebox
  - Type: Round-top
  - Grate area: 6.38 sq ft (0.593 m^{2})
- Boiler
  - Pitch: 5 ft 2 3/4 in (1,594 mm)
- Boiler pressure: 140 psi (965 kPa)
- Heating surface
  - Firebox: 36 sq ft (3.3 m^{2})
  - Tubes: 326 sq ft (30.3 m^{2})
  - Total surface: 362 sq ft (33.6 m^{2})
- Cylinders: Two
- Cylinder size: 10 1/2 in (267 mm) bore 16 in (406 mm) stroke
- Valve gear: Stephenson
- Couplers: Johnston link-and-pin
Performance figures
- Tractive effort: 6,150 lbf (27.4 kN) @ 75%
Career
- Operators: East London Harbour Board; Cape Government Railways; South African Railways
- Number in class: 2
- Numbers: ELHB 1-2, CGR 1027-1028, SAR 01027-01028
- Delivered: 1902
- First run: 1902
- Withdrawn: 1930s

The Cape Government Railways 0-6-0ST of 1902 was a South African steam locomotive from the pre-Union era in the Cape of Good Hope.

In 1902, two 0-6-0ST locomotives entered shunting service at the East London Harbour. They were taken onto the Cape Government Railways roster in 1909 and both were still in service when the South African Railways was established in 1912.

== Manufacturer ==
In 1902, two 0-6-0STlocomotives were delivered from Hunslet Engine Company to the East London Harbour Board, with works numbers 793 and 794, ex works in August and September 1902 respectively. Numbered 1 and 2 with number plates on their tanks and with plates reading "EAST LONDON HARBOUR BOARD" on their cabsides, they were placed in service as harbour shunters at East London Harbour.

== Service ==
=== Cape Government Railways ===
In terms of Act 38 of 1908, the Cape Government Railways (CGR) became responsible for the administration of the three major harbours in the Cape of Good Hope with effect from 1 January 1909. Both locomotives were therefore taken onto the CGR roster and renumbered to 1027 and 1028.

=== South African Railways ===
When the Union of South Africa was established on 31 May 1910, the three Colonial government railways (CGR, Natal Government Railways and Central South African Railways) were united under a single administration to control and administer the railways, ports and harbours of the Union. Although the South African Railways and Harbours came into existence in 1910, the actual classification and renumbering of all the rolling stock of the three constituent railways were only implemented with effect from 1 January 1912.

In 1912, the two locomotives were considered obsolete, even though they were only ten years old. As obsolete stock, they were renumbered by having the numeral "0" prefixed to their existing numbers, becoming 01027 and 01028. Even so, they remained in service into the 1930s.

== Illustration ==
The main picture and the following illustrate both sides of engine no. 01028 while in South African Railways service.

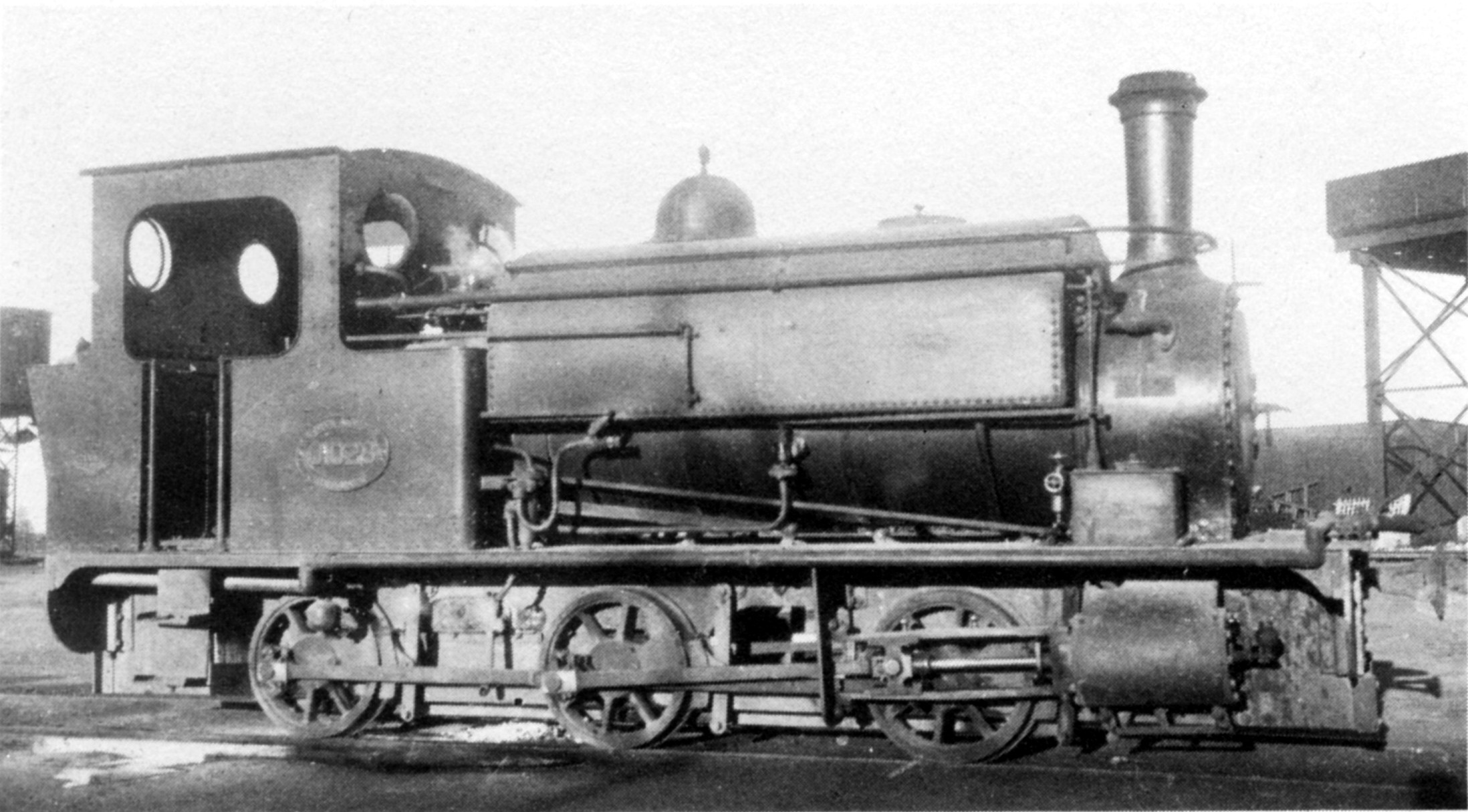
