= South West African 0-6-0T =

Steam locomotive

GSWA Six-Coupled Tank 0-6-0T South West African 0-6-0T
Type and origin
- Power type: Steam
- Designer: Orenstein & Koppel
- Builder: Orenstein & Koppel
- Serial number: 4256-4257
- Build date: 1911
- Total produced: 2
Specifications
- Configuration
  - Whyte: 0-6-0T
  - UIC: Cn2t
- Driver: 3rd coupled axle
- Gauge: 3 ft 6 in (1,067 mm) Cape gauge
- Coupled dia.: 31 1/2 in (800 mm)
- Axle load: 7 LT 6 cwt 3 qtr (7,455 kg) av.
- Adhesive weight: 22 LT (22,350 kg)
- Loco weight: 22 LT (22,350 kg)
- Fuel type: Coal
- Fuel capacity: 1 LT (1.0 t)
- Water cap.: 484 imp gal (2,200 L)
- Firebox
  - Type: Round-top
  - Grate area: 8.25 sq ft (0.766 m^{2})
- Boiler
  - Small tubes: 132: 1 3/4 in (44 mm)
- Boiler pressure: 171 psi (1,179 kPa)
- Heating surface: 565 sq ft (52.5 m^{2})
- Cylinders: Two
- Cylinder size: 13 in (330 mm) bore 15 3/4 in (400 mm) stroke
- Couplers: Buffer-and-chains
Performance figures
- Tractive effort: 8,660 lbf (38.5 kN) @ 75%
Career
- Operators: Lüderitzbucht Eisenbahn
- Number in class: 2
- Numbers: LE 201-202
- Delivered: 1911
- First run: 1911

The South West African 0-6-0T of 1911 was a steam locomotive from the German South West Africa era.

In 1911, the Lüderitzbucht Eisenbahn (Lüderitzbucht Railway) in German South West Africa placed two 0-6-0T locomotives in service as shunting engines. They were apparently no longer in service when all railways in the territory came under the administration of the South African Railways in 1922.

== Manufacturer ==
During 1911, two Cape Gauge 0-6-0T locomotives were delivered to the Lüderitzbucht Eisenbahn by Orenstein & Koppel. The locomotives, with works numbers 4256 and 4257, were supplied in January 1911 to the order of Consortium Bachstein-Koppel. They were numbered 201 and 202 and were placed in service as shunting engines.

== Characteristics ==
The locomotive's coal bunker had a capacity of 1 long ton (1.0 tonne) and the side-tanks had a water capacity of 484 imperial gallons (2,200 litres). It had coupled wheels of 31 1/2 inches (800 millimetres) diameter and cylinders of 13 inches (330 millimetres) bore and 15 3/4 in (400 mm) stroke. The total weight of the engine in full working order was 22 long tons (22,350 kilograms) and it had a tractive effort of 8,660 pounds-force (38.5 kilonewtons) at 75% of boiler pressure.

== Service ==
The two engines were placed in shunting service in Lüderitz. It is not known whether they survived the First World War and they do not appear to have still been in service on 1 April 1922, when all railways in the former German colony came under the administration of the South African Railways.
