= Durban Harbour's Sir Albert =

Type of steam locomotive

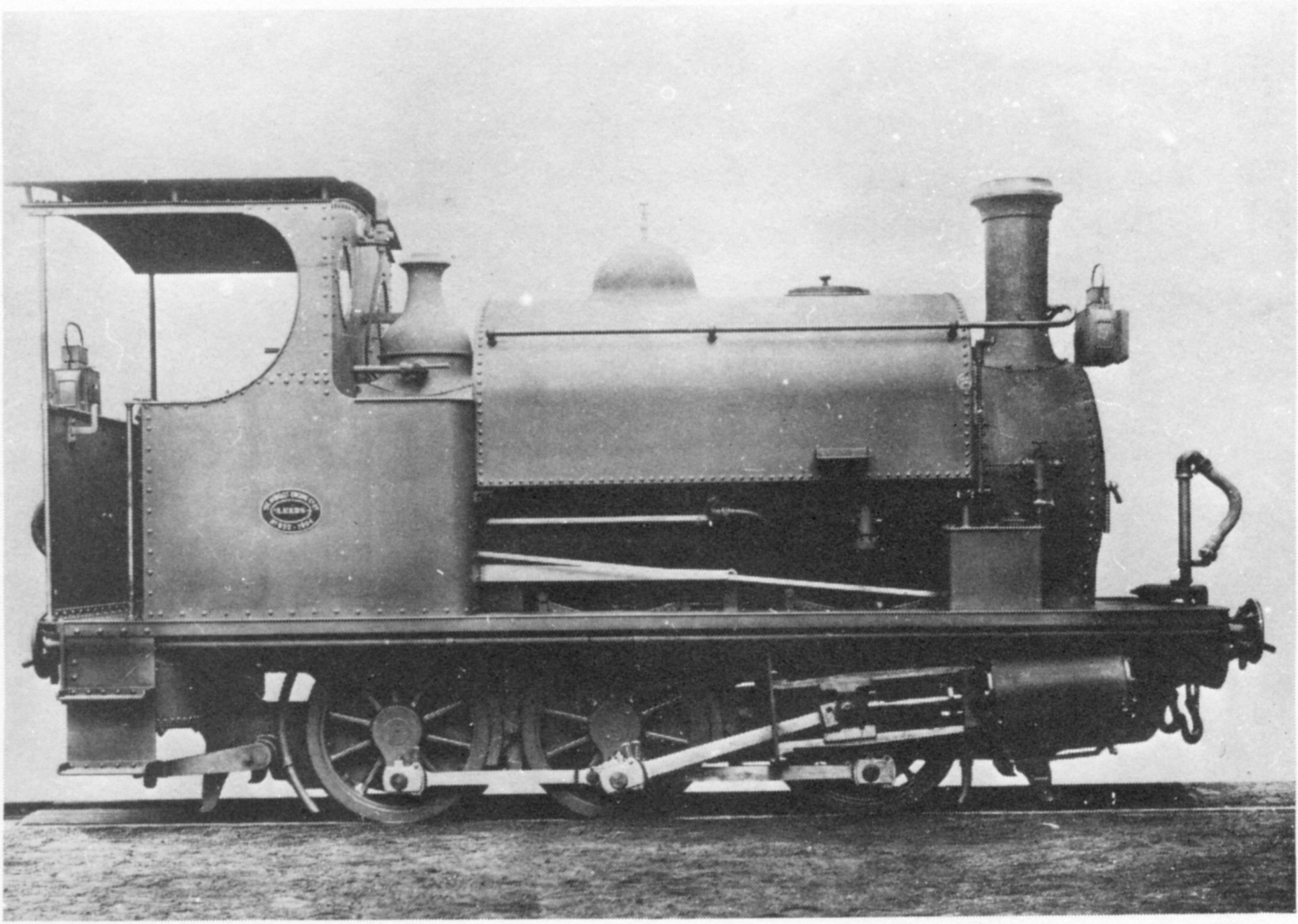
- Natal Harbours Department engine Sir Albert, c. 1904
Type and origin
- Power type: Steam
- Designer: Hunslet Engine Company
- Builder: Hunslet Engine Company
- Serial number: 852
- Build date: 1904
Specifications
- Configuration
  - Whyte: 0-6-0ST (Six-coupled)
  - UIC: Cn2t
- Driver: 2nd coupled axle
- Gauge: 3 ft 6 in (1,067 mm) Cape gauge
- Coupled dia.: 36 in (914 mm)
- Wheelbase: 7 ft 6 in (2,286 mm)
  - Axle spacing (Asymmetrical): 1-2: 4 ft (1,219 mm); 2-3: 3 ft 6 in (1,067 mm)
- Length
  - Over couplers: 20 ft 10 3/4 in (6,369 mm)
- Height: 10 ft 6 in (3,200 mm)
- Axle load: 7 LT 15 cwt (7,874 kg)
- Adhesive weight: 21 LT 5 cwt (21,590 kg)
- Loco weight: 21 LT 5 cwt (21,590 kg)
- Fuel type: Coal
- Fuel capacity: 1 LT (1.0 t)
- Water cap.: 450 imp gal (2,000 L)
- Firebox
  - Type: Round-top
  - Grate area: 7 sq ft (0.65 m^{2})
- Boiler
  - Pitch: 5 ft 3 3/4 in (1,619 mm)
  - Diameter: 3 ft 5 1/8 in (1,045 mm) outside
  - Tube plates: 7 ft 6 1/2 in (2,299 mm)
  - Small tubes: 94: 1 7/8 in (48 mm)
- Boiler pressure: 140 psi (965 kPa)
- Safety valve: Ramsbottom
- Heating surface
  - Firebox: 41 sq ft (3.8 m^{2})
  - Tubes: 347 sq ft (32.2 m^{2})
  - Total surface: 388 sq ft (36.0 m^{2})
- Cylinders: Two
- Cylinder size: 12 in (305 mm) bore 18 in (457 mm) stroke
- Valve gear: Stephenson
- Couplers: Johnston link-and-pin
Performance figures
- Tractive effort: 7,560 lbf (33.6 kN) @ 75%
Career
- Operators: Harbours Department of Natal; South African Railways
- Number in class: 1
- Numbers: HDN 4 & 46, SAR 046
- Official name: Sir Albert
- Delivered: 1904
- First run: 1904
- Withdrawn: 1915

Durban Harbour's Sir Albert of 1904 was a South African steam locomotive from the pre-Union era in the Natal Colony.

In 1904, the Harbours Department of the Natal Government placed a single 0-6-0ST saddle-tank locomotive, named Sir Albert, in service as harbour shunting engine in Durban Harbour.

== Port Advisory Board ==
In 1898, a Port Advisory Board was established in Durban, responsible for the management, control, improvement, development and maintenance of the facilities at Durban Harbour.

Railway operations in the harbour became the responsibility of the Harbours Department of the Government of Natal.

== Manufacturer ==
In 1904, the Natal Harbours Department placed a single 0-6-0 saddle-tank locomotive in service at Durban Harbour. It was built by Hunslet Engine Company of Leeds and was numbered as well as named, no. 4 Sir Albert, after Sir Albert Henry Hime, Prime Minister of Natal from 1899 to 1903.

== Service ==
According to some sources, Sir Albert was later renumbered to 46. It does not appear to have been taken onto the Natal Government Railways (NGR) roster.

When the Union of South Africa was established on 31 May 1910, the three Colonial government railways (Cape Government Railways, NGR and Central South African Railways) were united under a single administration to control and administer the railways, ports and harbours of the Union. Although the South African Railways and Harbours came into existence in 1910, the actual classification and renumbering of all the rolling stock of the three constituent railways were only implemented with effect from 1 January 1912.

Sir Albert was still in service at the harbour in 1912. Since the locomotive was considered obsolete, it was renumbered to 046 and not classified on the SAR. It kept on working at Durban Harbour until it was withdrawn from service in 1915.
