= Kowie Railway 0-6-0T =

South African steam locomotive

Kowie Railway 0-6-0T Kowie Railway 4-4-0T 1884
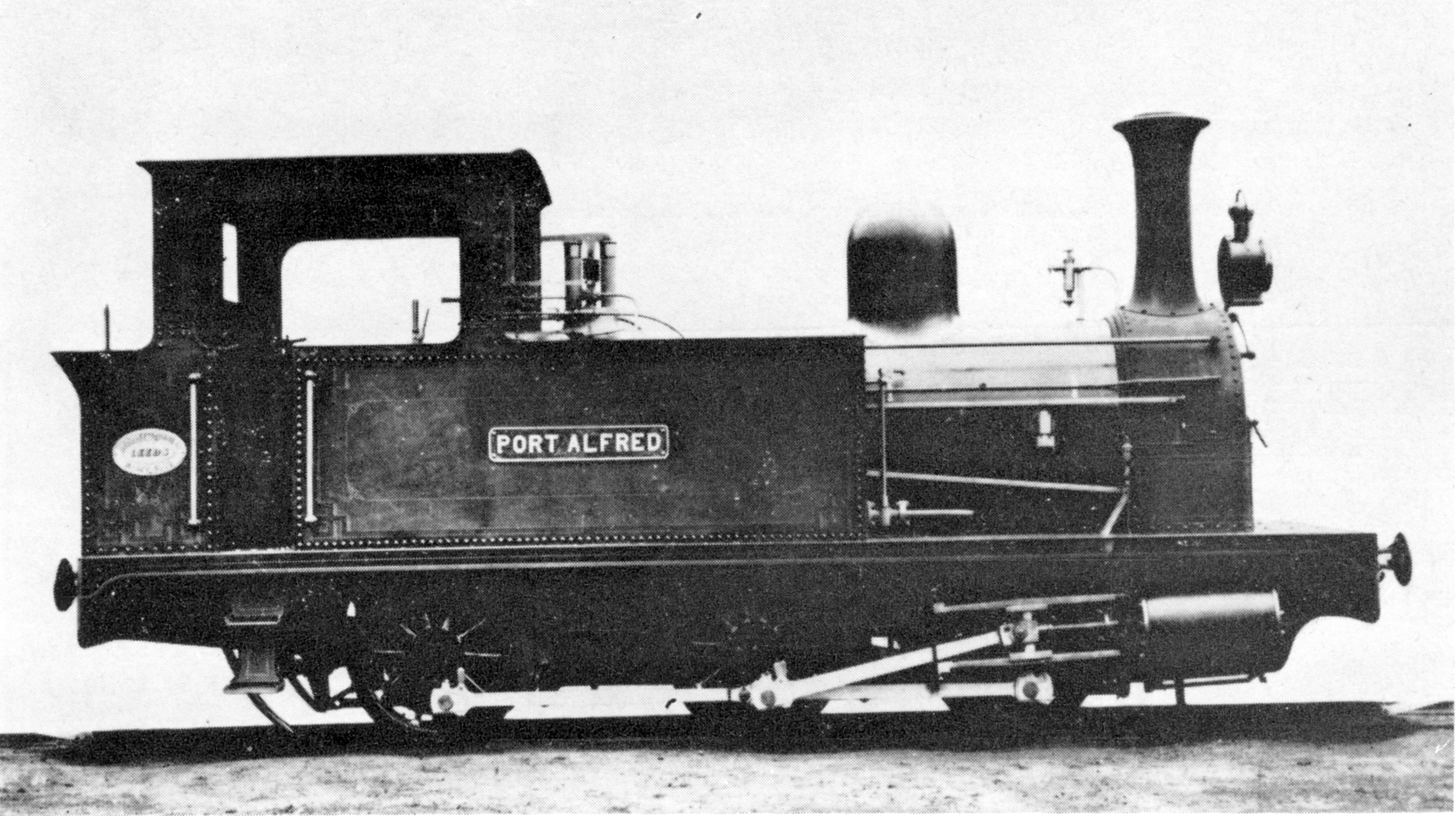
- Kowie Railway 0-6-0T Port Alfred, as built
Type and origin
- ♠ – Original 0-6-0T locomotive, as built ♥ – Locomotive rebuilt to 4-4-0T
- Power type: Steam
- Designer: Hunslet Engine Company
- Builder: Hunslet Engine Company
- Serial number: 277–278
- Build date: 1882
- Total produced: 2
- Rebuilder: Kowie Railway
- Rebuild date: 1884
- Number rebuilt: 2 to 4-4-0T
Specifications
- Configuration
  - Whyte: ♠ 0-6-0T ♥ 4-4-0T
  - UIC: ♠ Cn2t – ♥ 2'Bn2t
- Driver: ♠ 2nd coupled axle ♥ 1st coupled axle
- Gauge: 3 ft 6 in (1,067 mm) Cape gauge
- Leading dia.: ♥ 20 in (508 mm)
- Coupled dia.: 36 in (914 mm)
- Wheelbase: ♠ 10 ft 3 in (3,124 mm) ♥ 15 ft 11 1/4 in (4,858 mm)
  - Axle spacing (Asymmetrical): ♠ 1-2: 4 ft 7 in (1,397 mm); 2-3: 5 ft 8 in (1,727 mm)
  - Leading: ♥ 4 ft 10 in (1,473 mm)
  - Coupled: ♠ 10 ft 3 in (3,124 mm) ♥ 5 ft 8 in (1,727 mm)
- Length: ♠ 24 ft 10 in (7,569 mm) ♥ 26 ft 3 3/4 in (8,020 mm)
- Height: 10 ft 10 1/4 in (3,308 mm)
- Adhesive weight: ♠ 22 LT 10 cwt (22,860 kg)
- Loco weight: ♠ 22 LT 10 cwt (22,860 kg)
- Fuel type: Coal
- Fuel capacity: ♠ 1 LT 10 cwt (1.5 t)
- Water cap.: ♠ 550 imp gal (2,500 L)
- Firebox
  - Type: Round-top
  - Grate area: 7.75 sq ft (0.720 m^{2})
- Boiler
  - Pitch: 5 ft 3 1/4 in (1,607 mm)
  - Diameter: 3 ft 4 1/2 in (1,029 mm)
  - Tube plates: 7 ft 10 in (2,388 mm)
  - Small tubes: 106: 1 3/4 in (44 mm)
- Boiler pressure: 160 psi (1,103 kPa)
- Safety valve: Ramsbottom
- Heating surface
  - Firebox: 49 sq ft (4.6 m^{2})
  - Tubes: 392 sq ft (36.4 m^{2})
  - Total surface: 441 sq ft (41.0 m^{2})
- Cylinders: Two
- Cylinder size: 12 in (305 mm) bore 19 in (483 mm) stroke
- Valve gear: Stephenson
- Couplers: Johnston link-and-pin
Performance figures
- Tractive effort: ♠ 9,120 lbf (40.6 kN) @ 75%
Career
- Operators: Kowie Railway; South African Railways
- Number in class: 2
- Official name: Port Alfred & Kowie
- Delivered: 1882
- First run: 1882

The Kowie Railway 0-6-0T of 1882 was a South African steam locomotive from the pre-Union era in the Cape of Good Hope.

In 1882, two 0-6-0T locomotives entered service on the private Kowie Railway which was being constructed between Port Alfred and Grahamstown. Both locomotives were rebuilt to a 4-4-0T wheel arrangement in 1884.

== The Kowie Railway ==
The private Kowie Railway line from Port Alfred to Grahamstown was built and operated by three successive private enterprises. Early in 1881, the Government of the Cape of Good Hope passed a Bill to authorise the London-based Grahamstown and Port Alfred Railway Company to construct a railway from Port Alfred northwestwards to Grahamstown. The company was established with a capital of £200,000 and, since the railway was to link Grahamstown with the harbour at Port Alfred, the Government undertook to subsidise it to the extent of £500,000.

The Port Alfred-Grahamstown-Alicedale line

The greatest challenge to overcome during the building of the railway was the construction of the Blaauwkrantz Bridge across the Kowie River, which delayed progress. In 1882, the 43-mile-long (69-kilometre) railway was partially opened to traffic as far as Blaauwkrantz. The line was only completed to Grahamstown and opened to traffic on 3 December 1884. The track had approximately 6% of 1 in 40 (2½%) and 30% of 1 in 50 (2%) gradients.

== Manufacturer ==
On 22 May 1882, two 0-6-0T locomotives for the Grahamstown and Port Alfred Railway Company, built by Hunslet Engine Company with works numbers 277 and 278, were landed at Port Alfred off the SS Rothesay. The locomotives were acquired for goods working and were named Port Alfred and Kowie respectively.

== Modification ==
In 1884, both locomotives were rebuilt to 4-4-0T locomotives. The necessary parts and equipment for the conversion were supplied by Hunslet and the rebuilding took place at Port Alfred. It involved the removal of the leading coupled wheels, extending the frame in front of the smokebox and the installation of a four-wheeled leading bogie.

== Liquidations ==
Partly as a result of the delays which occurred during the Kowie Harbour development at Port Alfred due to the continuous silting up of the Kowie River, the Grahamstown and Port Alfred Railway Company soon suffered financial difficulties and was forced into liquidation in 1887.

A group of Grahamstown residents formed a syndicate in 1888 and took over the operation of the line to Port Alfred until 1895, when they sold out to the Kowie Railway Company.

== South African Railways ==
Following a major disaster when a passenger train derailed on the Blaauwkrantz Bridge in 1911, the resultant claims against the Kowie Railway Company led to its bankruptcy. On 1 April 1913, the line and the locomotives were taken over by the Union Government and became part of the South African Railways. The two locomotives remained in service on this line until they were scrapped.
