= South West African Class Hc =

Steam locomotive

GSWA Class Hc 0-6-0T South West African Class Hc 0-6-0T South African Class Hc 0-6-0T
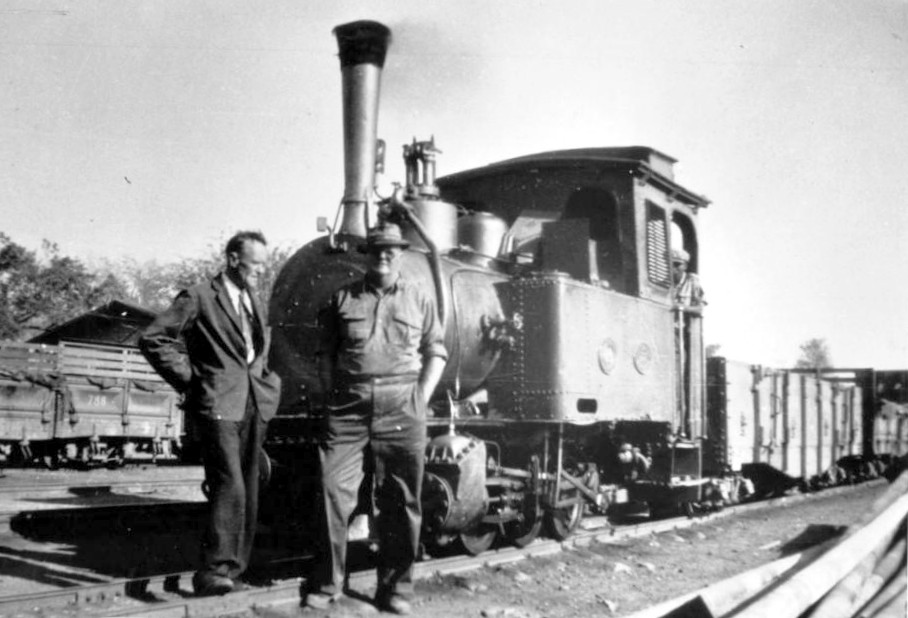
- Class Hc no. 84, c. 1930
Type and origin
- Power type: Steam
- Designer: Henschel & Son
- Builder: Henschel & Son
- Serial number: 8334–8336, 10415, 10765, 19765
- Model: Class Hc
- Build date: 1907, 1910, 1911, 1923
- Total produced: 6
Specifications
- Configuration
  - Whyte: 0-6-0T
  - UIC: Cn2t
- Driver: 3rd coupled axle
- Gauge: 600 mm (1 ft 11 5/8 in) narrow
- Coupled dia.: 24 13/16 in (630 mm)
- Length
  - Over couplers: 17 ft 11 7/8 in (5,483 mm)
- Adhesive weight: 10 LT 15 cwt (10,920 kg)
- Loco weight: 10 LT 15 cwt (10,920 kg)
- Fuel type: Coal
- Fuel capacity: 660 lb (299 kg)
- Water cap.: 220 imp gal (1,000 L)
- Firebox
  - Type: Round-top
  - Grate area: 4.8 sq ft (0.45 m^{2})
- Boiler pressure: 171 psi (1,179 kPa)
- Cylinders: Two
- Cylinder size: 8 21/32 in (220 mm) bore 11 13/16 in (300 mm) stroke
- Valve gear: Allan
- Valve type: Slide
- Couplers: Buffers-and-chain
Performance figures
- Tractive effort: 4,575 lbf (20.35 kN) @ 75%
Career
- Operators: Otavi Mining and Railway Co. South African Railways
- Class: Class Hc
- Number in class: 6
- Numbers: 81–84, 104, 106
- Delivered: 1907–1923
- First run: 1907

The South West African Class Hc 0-6-0T of 1907 was a narrow gauge steam locomotive from the German South West Africa era.

In 1907, the German Administration in German South West Africa acquired three Class Hc 0-6-0T locomotives for lease to the Otavi Mining and Railway Company. Two more entered service in 1910 and 1911, and a sixth was acquired new by the South African Railways in 1923.

== Manufacturer ==
Three 600 millimetres (23.6 inches) narrow gauge 0-6-0T steam locomotives were built by Henschel and Son in Germany in 1907 for the German Administration in German South West Africa (GSWA). Their works numbers were in the range from 8334 to 8336. The engines were designated Class Hc and numbered in the range from 81 to 83.

== German South West Africa ==
The locomotives used Allan valve gear. Their small coal bunkers had a capacity of only 660 pounds (299 kilograms), while the water capacity of their side tanks was 220 imperial gallons (1,000 litres).

The "Hc" classification identified the type as the third class to have been built for GSWA by Henschel, probably excluding locomotives which were no longer in service by the time the First World War broke out. They were leased to the Otavi Mining and Railway Company who operated a narrow gauge railway across the Namib Desert between Swakopmund and Tsumeb.

In 1910 and 1911, two more Class Hc locomotives, no. 104 with works number 10415 and no. 106 with works number 10765, were delivered by Henschel for service on the Otavi Railway. They were employed as shunting locomotives at Otavi.

== South African Railways ==
During the First World War, the former German Colony came under South African administration and the railways in GSWA came under control of the Union Defence Forces. Control of all railway operations in South West Africa (SWA) was passed on from the Military to the Director of Railways in Windhoek on 1 August 1915. On 1 April 1922, all the railway lines and rolling stock in the territory became part of the South African Railways (SAR).

None of the five pre-war Class Hc locomotives survived the war into the SAR era. In 1923, the SAR ordered a new one, no. 84, which was built to the same design by Henschel with works number 19765. This locomotive was not preserved and was presumably scrapped.

== Works numbers ==
The works numbers, years built and engine numbers of the Class Hc locomotives are listed in the table.

Class Hc works numbers
Works no.	Year built	Loco no.
8334	1907	81
8335	1907	82
8336	1907	83
10415	1910	104
10765	1911	106
19765	1923	84

== Illustration ==
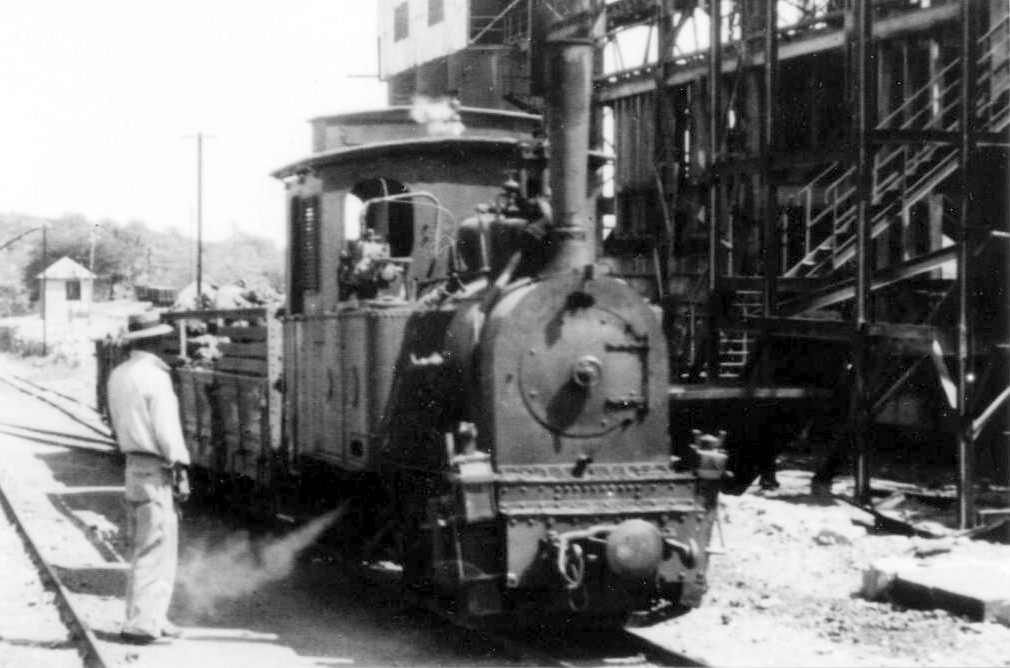
Class Hc at Tsumeb, c. 1930
