= Victorian Railways P class (1859) =

Class of Australian 0-6-0 steam locomotives

Type and origin
- Power type: Steam
- Builder: Beyer, Peacock & Company, Manchester, UK
- Serial number: 115 - 119
- Build date: 1859
- Total produced: 5
Specifications
- Configuration
  - Whyte: 0-6-0
- Gauge: 5 ft 3 in (1,600 mm) Victorian broad gauge
- Driver dia.: 5 ft 0 in (1,520 mm)
- Tender wheels: 3 ft 6 in (1.07 m)
- Wheelbase: 32 ft 0 1/2 in (9.766 m)
  - Coupled: 14 ft 4 in (4,370 mm)
  - Tender: 11 ft 0 in (3.35 m)
- Length
  - Over couplers: 43 ft 1 1/4 in (13.138 m)
- Height: 13 ft 6 in (4.11 m)
- Axle load: 10 long tons 2 cwt (22,600 lb or 10.3 t); 1904 diagram: 11 long tons 4 cwt (25,100 lb or 11.4 t); 1914 diagram: 11 long tons 12 cwt (26,000 lb or 11.8 t)
- Loco weight: 28 long tons 12 cwt (64,100 lb or 29.1 t); 1904 diagram: 29 long tons 8 cwt 1 qr (65,880 lb or 29.88 t); 1914 diagram: 30 long tons 12 cwt (68,500 lb or 31.1 t)
- Tender weight: 24 long tons 2 cwt (54,000 lb or 24.5 t); 1914 diagram: 21 long tons 6 cwt (47,700 lb or 21.6 t)
- Total weight: 52 long tons 14 cwt (118,000 lb or 53.5 t); 1904 diagram: 53 long tons 10 cwt 1 qr (119,870 lb or 54.37 t); 1914 diagram: 51 long tons 18 cwt (116,300 lb or 52.7 t)
- Fuel capacity: 60 long cwt (6,700 lb or 3,000 kg)
- Water cap.: 1,722 imp gal (7,830 L; 2,068 US gal)
- Firebox
  - Grate area: 14.03 sq ft (1.303 m^{2})
- Boiler pressure: 1904 diagram: 5: 120 psi (827 kPa); 3, 7, 9: 130 psi (896 kPa); 1: 150 psi (1,034 kPa); 1914 diagram: 150 psi (1,034 kPa)
- Heating surface
  - Firebox: 88.95 sq ft (8.264 m^{2}); 1914 diagram: 88.5 sq ft (8 m^{2})
  - Tubes: 1,097.67 sq ft (101.977 m^{2}); 1914 diagram: 994.1 sq ft (92 m^{2})
  - Total surface: 1,186.62 sq ft (110 m^{2}); 1914 diagram: 1,082.6 sq ft (101 m^{2})
- Cylinders: 2, inside
- Cylinder size: 16 in × 22 in (406 mm × 559 mm)
Performance figures
- Tractive effort: 9,386 lbf (41.75 kN) at 100 psi 1904 diagram - 150psi: 11,264 lbf (50.10 kN)
Career
- Operators: Victorian Railways
- Number in class: 5
- Numbers: 5-9, 1860: 1-9 (odd only)
- Delivered: 1860
- First run: March 1860
- Last run: 18 February 1921 (61 years)
- Withdrawn: 1917 - 1921
- Disposition: All scrapped

The Victorian Railways P class was a class of 0-6-0 goods locomotives operated by the Victorian Railways between 1860 and 1921, built by Beyer, Peacock & Company, Manchester, England.

== History ==
Victorian Railways initially numbered passenger and goods locomotives separately, the engines were numbered 5–9. This was changed in the late 1860s to odd numbers for goods locomotives and even numbers for passenger locos with these locomotives taking the odd numbers 1–9. This odd and even system remained in use until 1912. In 1886, they were allocated to Class P.

=== Production ===
The five locomotives were built in 1859 with builder's numbers 115–119 at an average cost of £3779-12-0 for each loco. They arrived in Port Phillip in March 1860.

=== Regular service ===
In addition to regular goods service, some were loaned to contractors, like Cornish & Bruce, for line construction and ballasting purposes. In 1894, all were allocated to Bendigo.

=== Design improvements ===
Victorian Railways P 7 with upgrades including upgraded boiler.

Over the years they were fitted with various alterations to the cabs. There were also various upgrades over the years; with constant improvements to safety — these including things like updates to safety valves (and domes), smokeboxs and chimneys (with spark arrestors), and brakes.
P1 received a new boiler in December 1894. Then between 1903 and 1906 they were all reboilered with a new boiler pressures of 150psi.

=== Demise ===
P3 was withdrawn in 1917, P5 and P9 in 1919, P7 in 1920, and P1 in 1921.

== Fleet summary ==
Key:	In service	Preserved	Stored or withdrawn	Scrapped

Locomotive	Previous numbers	Builder no.	Entered service	Withdrawn	Scrapped	Status	Notes
P1	6	116	March 1860	7 June 1919		Scrapped	Hired to Evans, Merry & Co. - 1860. Reboilered - 13 December 1894. Reboilered - November 1903
P3	8	118	October 1860	18 February 1921		Scrapped	Hired to Cornish & Bruce - October 1860. Painted red - 1904
P5	5	115	April 1860	19 February 1920		Scrapped	
P7	7	117	November 1860	19 May 1917		Scrapped	
P9	9	119	September 1860	30 August 1919		Scrapped	
