= Durban Harbour's John Milne =

Type of steam locomotive

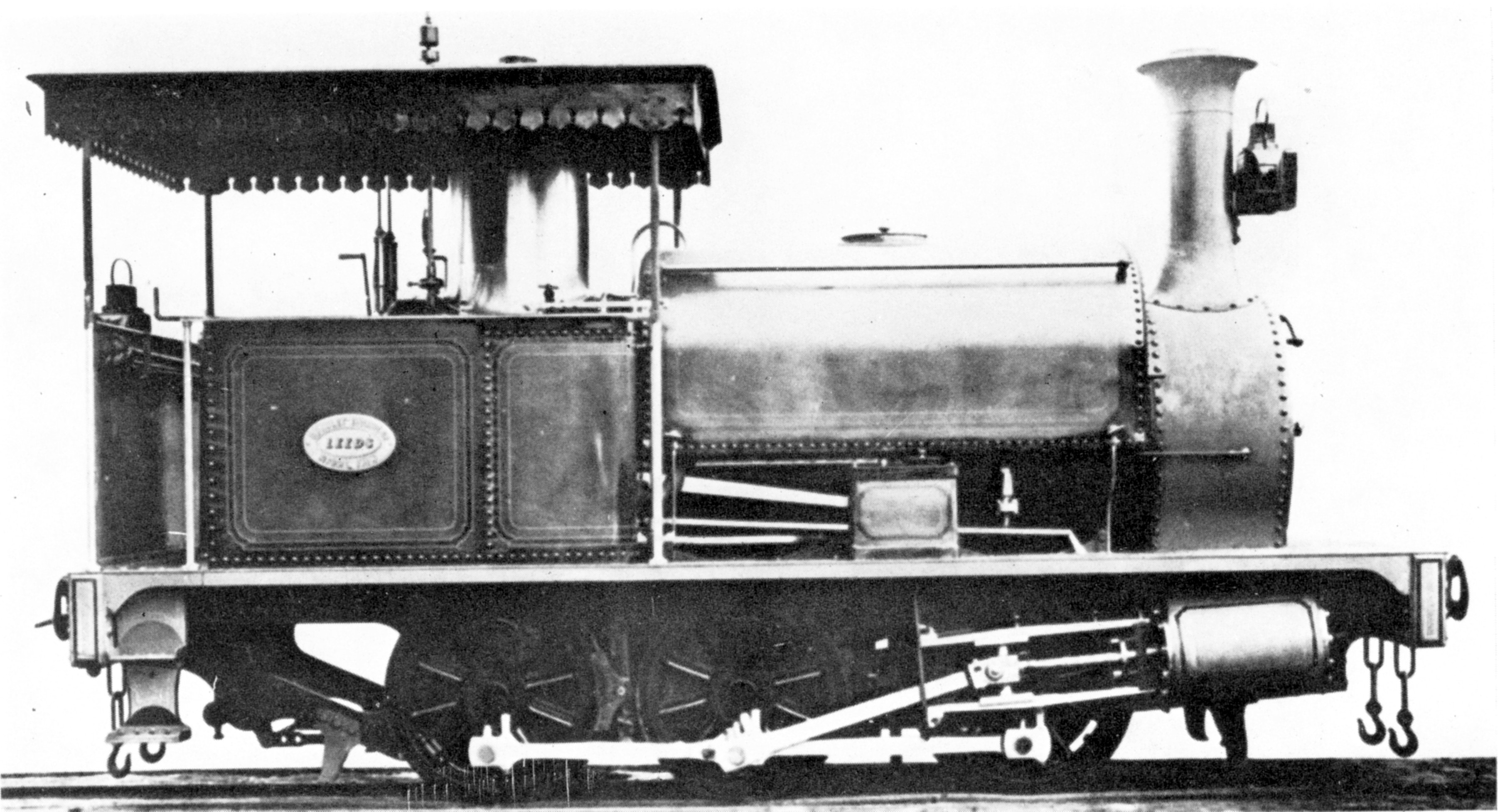
- Natal Harbours Department locomotive John Milne
Type and origin
- Power type: Steam
- Designer: Hunslet Engine Company
- Builder: Hunslet Engine Company
- Serial number: 225
- Build date: 1879
Specifications
- Configuration
  - Whyte: 0-6-0ST (Six-coupled)
  - UIC: Cn2t
- Driver: 2nd coupled axle
- Gauge: 3 ft 6 in (1,067 mm) Cape gauge
- Coupled dia.: 36 in (914 mm)
- Wheelbase: 7 ft 6 in (2,286 mm)
  - Axle spacing (Asymmetrical): 1-2: 4 ft (1,219 mm); 2-3: 3 ft 6 in (1,067 mm)
- Length
  - Over couplers: 20 ft 11 in (6,375 mm)
  - Over beams: 18 ft 6 in (5,639 mm)
- Height: 10 ft 8 in (3,251 mm)
- Adhesive weight: 43,792 lb (19,864 kg)
- Loco weight: 43,792 lb (19,864 kg)
- Fuel type: Coal
- Fuel capacity: 15 long hundredweight (0.8 t)
- Water cap.: 450 imp gal (2,000 L)
- Firebox
  - Type: Round-top
  - Grate area: 7 sq ft (0.65 m^{2})
- Boiler
  - Pitch: 5 ft (1,524 mm)
  - Diameter: 3 ft 2 in (965 mm) outside
  - Tube plates: 7 ft 6 1/2 in (2,299 mm)
  - Small tubes: 97: 1 7/8 in (48 mm)
- Boiler pressure: 130 psi (896 kPa)
- Safety valve: Salter
- Heating surface
  - Firebox: 39 sq ft (3.6 m^{2})
  - Tubes: 353 sq ft (32.8 m^{2})
  - Total surface: 392 sq ft (36.4 m^{2})
- Cylinders: Two
- Cylinder size: 12 in (305 mm) bore 18 in (457 mm) stroke
- Valve gear: Stephenson
- Couplers: Johnston link-and-pin
Performance figures
- Tractive effort: 7,020 lbf (31.2 kN) @ 75%
Career
- Operators: Harbour Board of Natal
- Number in class: 1
- Official name: John Milne
- Delivered: 1879
- First run: 1879
- The 2nd coupled axle had flangeless wheels

Durban Harbour's John Milne of 1879 was a South African steam locomotive from the pre-Union era in the Colony of Natal.

In 1879, the Harbour Board of Natal placed a single 0-6-0ST saddle-tank locomotive in service, its first own locomotive for shunting work on the docks.

== Harbour Board of Natal ==
A board of commissioners, known as the Harbour Board of Natal, was established by the government of the Colony of Natal at the port of Durban in 1877. It consisted of seven members, the Colonial Engineer, the Collector of Customs, the Port Captain, the Mayor of Durban, two nominees from the Durban Chamber of Commerce and one member appointed by the Natal Government. As in the Cape of Good Hope, the board was responsible for the continuous development of the harbour to be able to accommodate the ever-increasing size and number of ships calling at the port.

Railway operations in the harbour became the responsibility of the Harbours Department of the Government of Natal.

== Manufacturer ==
It would appear that, until 1879, the Natal Government Railways (NGR) provided all the locomotive power for harbour working. The Harbour Board acquired its first own locomotive for shunting work on the docks in 1879. It was a 0-6-0ST saddle-tank engine which had been ordered from Hunslet Engine Company in Leeds and was named John Milne, after the first engineer who had been appointed in 1851 to remove the sand-bar at the entrance to Durban Harbour.

== Service ==
It is not known whether the engine John Milne had been scrapped or sold by 1912, but it was no longer in service when the South African Railways (SAR) renumbering and classification was implemented in 1912, since it does not appear in the classification and renumbering lists which were issued by the SAR Chief Mechanical Engineer in January 1912.
