= BRM class =

Australian diesel-electric locomotives

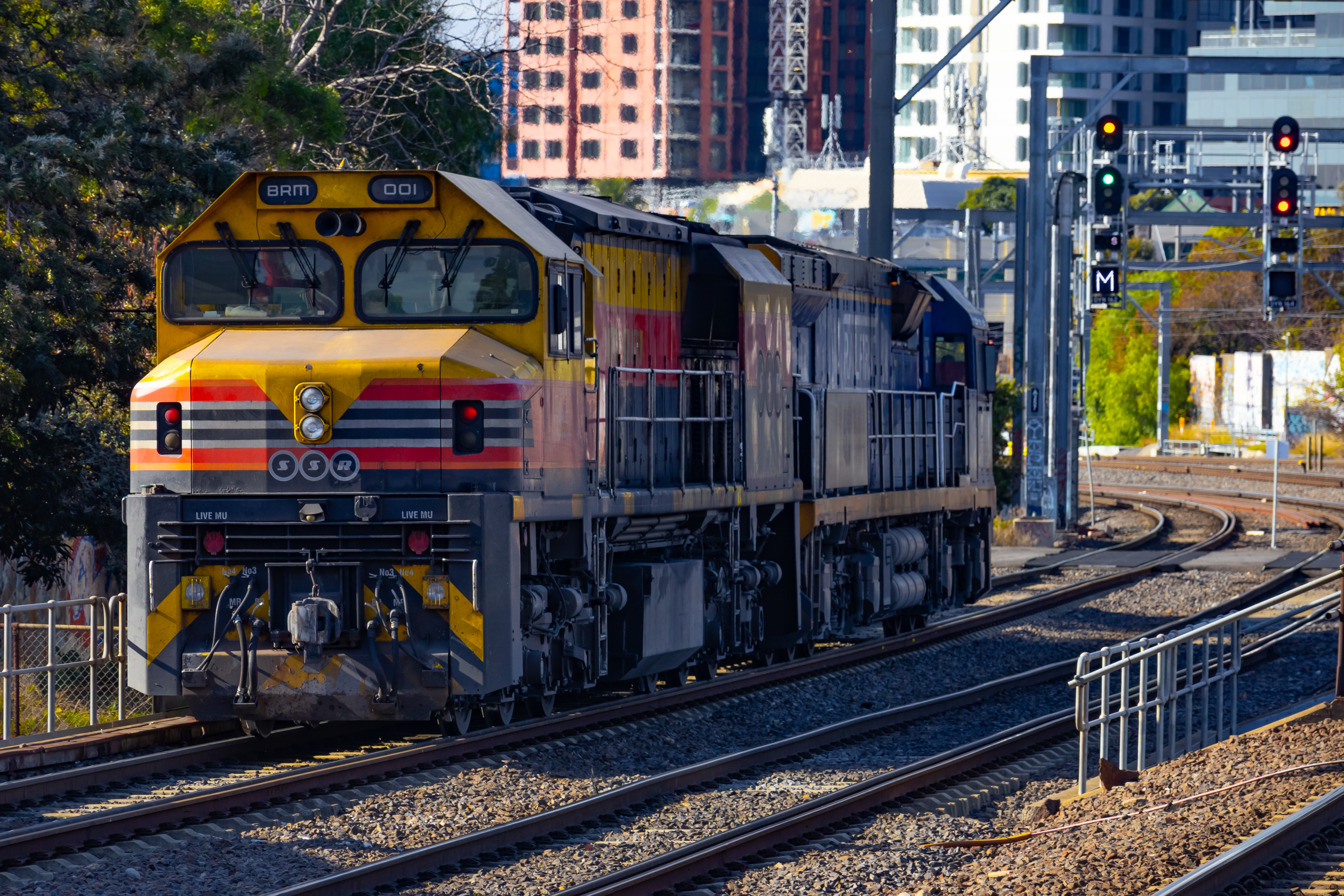
Type and origin
- Power type: Diesel-Electric
- Builder: Southern Shorthaul Railroad, Bendigo Workshops
- Model: GT26C
- Build date: 2012–2013
- Total produced: 2
Specifications
- Configuration
  - Whyte: Co-Co
- Gauge: 1,435 mm (4 ft 8 1/2 in)
- Length: 17.37 metres
- Width: 2.96 metres
- Height: 4.36 metres
- Loco weight: 132 tonnes (291,000 lb)
- Prime mover: EMD 16-645E3C
- Alternator: Electro-Motive Division 710
- Traction motors: Electro-Motive Division D78
Performance figures
- Maximum speed: 115 km/h (71 mph)
- Power output: 2,461 kW (3,300 hp)
Career
- Operators: Southern Shorthaul Railroad
- Class: BRM
- Number in class: 2
- Numbers: BRM001-BRM002
- Delivered: 2012–2013
- First run: 2012
- Current owner: Southern Shorthaul Railroad
- Disposition: 2 in service

The BRM class is a diesel electric locomotive designed and built in-house by Southern Shorthaul Railroad in Australia. It is a copy of the VL class built by Avteq for Chicago Freight Car Leasing Australia. Features include Wabtec Fastbrake and QES3 traction control.
