= Bendigo Workshops =

Railway workshop in Victoria, Australia

Coordinates: 36.7457°S 144.2976°E

- Built: November 1917
- Location: Bendigo, Australia
- Products: Trains
- Buildings: 31
- Area: 10.3 ha (25 acres)

Bendigo Workshops is a railway workshop in Bendigo, Victoria, Australia. It is located in the north of the city beside the junction of the Yungera and Deniliquin railway lines. The site covers 10.3 hectares of land and has 31 separate buildings, including a 10,000 sqm main workshop building and six kilometres of railway track.

== History ==
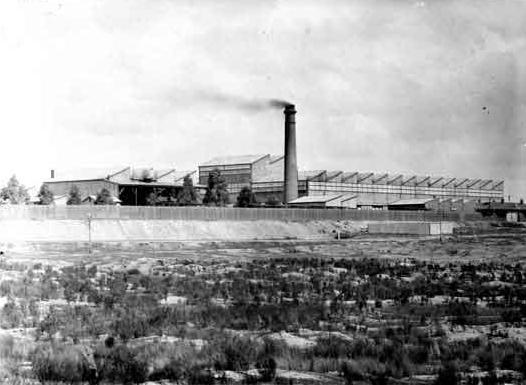
Exterior of the workshops

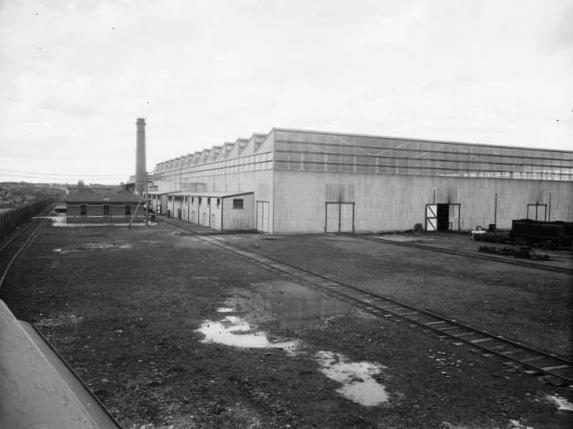
Main workshop building

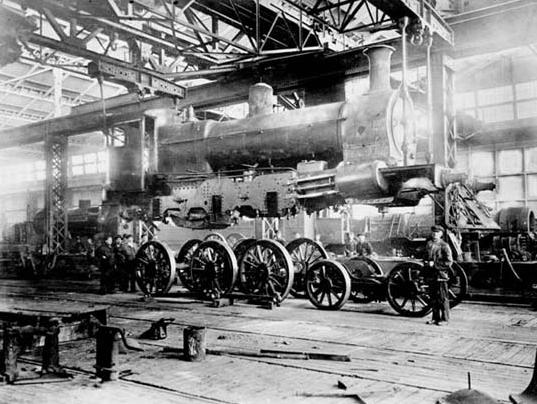
Lifting a D^{D} class steam locomotive

The workshops were opened in November 1917 by the Victorian Railways. It opened in response to political pressures from provincial groups for decentralisation, with the Victorian Railways preferring the cheaper option of expanding the existing Newport Workshops in suburban Melbourne. Furthermore, unemployment had risen in both Bendigo and Ballarat due to a decline in mining operations. The main work carried out was repairs and maintenance of existing wagons and locomotives, however during 1919-22 thirteen new steam locomotives were also built - eight D^{D} class (1033 - 1037, 1047 - 1049) and five A^{2} class (1078 - 1082).

From the 1950s onwards, numerous steam locomotives were scrapped at the workshops. During the years immediately following nominal dieselisation in 1968, they were, at times, cutting up locomotives at the rate of one every two to three weeks.

The workshops were also the site of the first VR brass foundry, which was transferred to Newport by the 1960s. Also throughout 1965 VLX louvred vans were constructed at the workshops, at a rate of one a week. Other tasks included spring manufacture, construction of stainless steel footwarmers, and assembly of pantographs for electric trains, with a staff of 720 employed during 1966. By the 1980s, refurbishment work was also being carried out on Melbourne suburban electric multiple units.

The 1980s were also a time of restructuring, and on the breakup of the Victorian Railways the workshops passed to the State Transport Authority and then the Public Transport Corporation. With privatisation the workshops were closed, with the loss of 262 jobs. In February 1996, the workshops were taken over by A Goninan & Co.

In October 1999 the workshops were purchased by Great Northern Rail Services, with A Goninan & Co remaining as a tenant. In February 2001 A Goninan & Co vacated the site.

The workshops were redeveloped in 2002 at a cost of $6.5 million - $4 million from VicTrack, $2 million from the State Government Regional Infrastructure Development Fund and $500,000 by the City of Greater Bendigo. The redevelopment was officially opened in 2004, with Empire Rubber (a division of Nylex) the major tenant, producing rubber vehicle components until the company collapsed in 2007.

Since 2009, the workshops had been leased to Southern Shorthaul Railroad, who use the site for locomotive and rollingstock maintenance for Aurizon, GrainCorp, Metro Trains Melbourne, Pacific National, Qube Holdings, Rail First Asset Management and V/Line. In 2012 it built two BRM class locomotives at the workshops.
