= Australian National EL class =

Class of diesel locomotives

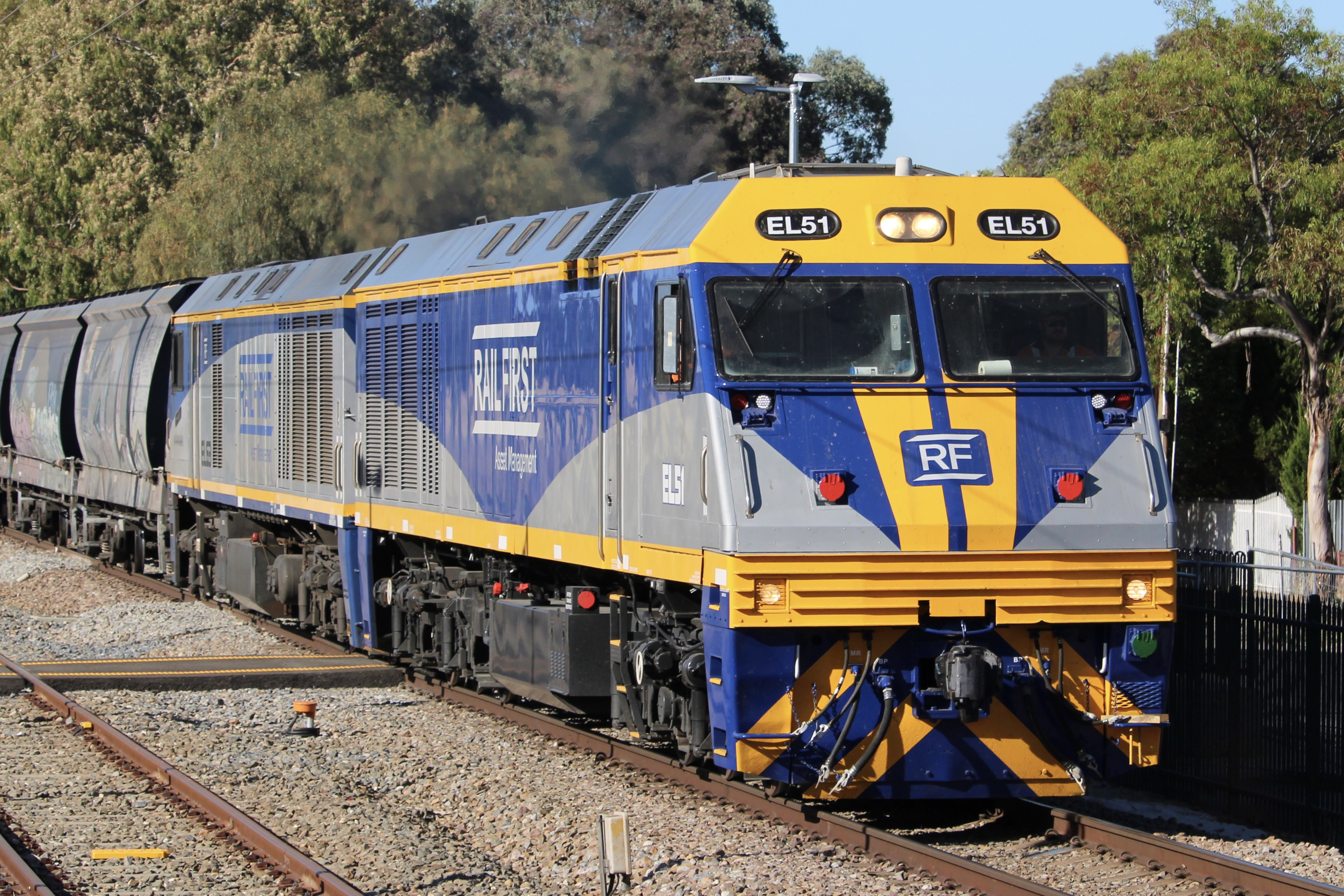
- EL51 and EL63 leading a grain train at Chidda, 2021
Type and origin
- Power type: Diesel-electric
- Builder: A Goninan & Co, Broadmeadow
- Serial number: 8013-07/90-103 to 8013-07/90-116
- Model: General Electric C30-8
- Build date: 1990–1991
- Total produced: 14
Specifications
- Configuration
  - UIC: Co-Co
- Gauge: 1,435 mm (4 ft 8 1/2 in) standard gauge
- Length: 20.5 m (67 ft 3 in)
- Axle load: 19.0t
- Loco weight: 114.0t
- Fuel type: Diesel
- Fuel capacity: 7,500 liters (1,600 imp gal; 2,000 U.S. gal)
- Prime mover: GE 7FDL-12
- RPM
  - Maximum RPM: 1,050 RPM
- Engine type: V12 diesel
- Aspiration: Turbocharger
- Alternator: Ge GMG192
- Traction motors: 6 x GE 761-ANR1
- Cylinders: 12
- Transmission: Electric
- Gear ratio: 93:19
- MU working: Yes
- Loco brake: Air, Independent Air, Dynamic brake
- Train brakes: Air
- Safety systems: Driver Vigilance
Performance figures
- Maximum speed: 140 km/h (87 mph) (pre-1998); 125 km/h (78 mph) (post-1998)
- Power output: 2,460 kW (3,300 hp)
- Tractive effort: 368 kN (82,729.69 lbf)
Career
- Operators: Rail First Asset Management
- Number in class: 14
- Numbers: EL51–EL64
- Delivered: 1990
- First run: Aug 1990
- Last run: Oct 1991
- Withdrawn: Aug 2026
- Current owner: Rail First Asset Management
- Disposition: 12 stored, 2 scrapped

The EL class locomotives are a class of diesel locomotives built by A Goninan & Co, Broadmeadow for Australian National in 1990–1991.

== History ==
In June 1989, Australian National awarded a contract for 14 Dash 8 locomotives to A Goninan & Co with the first delivered in July 1990. Even though they were the most powerful locomotives to have operated by Australian National, they were fitted with lightweight traction motors which reduced their tractive effort by 33% compared to the preceding DL class locomotives. They were ordered for use on passenger and fast freight services and geared for a top speed of 140 km/h.

They regularly hauled The Ghan and Indian Pacific until replaced by CLP class locomotives in 1994. They were transferred to National Rail, however, following the delivery of the NR class, 13 were returned to Australian National and by November 1997 were stored at Islington Railway Workshops. The 14th had been destroyed in an accident at Mount Christie in February 1997. Six were briefly hired to Australian Southern Railroad in late 1997.

In November 1998, the remaining 13 were sold to Chicago Freight Car Leasing Australia (CFCLA, later RailFirst Asset Management). In 1999, New Zealand railway operator Tranz Rail began negotiating with CFCLA for the potential lease or outright purchase of all the remaining EL class locomotives. The locomotives would have required bogie conversions to fit New Zealand's narrow track gauge and smaller loading gauge. Nothing further came from negotiations between Tranz Rail and CFCLA.

All were overhauled by A Goninan & Co, Bassendean, during which they were re-geared, reducing their top speed to 125 km/h, but resulting in their tractive effort increasing by 19%. All were repainted into Chicago Freight Car Leasing Australia's yellow, blue and silver livery and named after famous Australian racehorses. They have been leased to a variety of operators and have run in all mainland states.

Despite efforts by owner Rail First Asset Management the locomotives have struck what appears to be the end of their life, due to a lack of proper maintenance and lack of fleet availability operators such as SCT, SSR, SRS have terminated their leases of the class and opted for the newer CF Class. with the classes future un-certain they have re-appeared for sale in one last effort to save them.

== Status table ==
Key:	In service	Stored	Preserved	Converted	Under overhaul	Scrapped

Number	Name	Serial no	Date	Status	Owner	Livery	Operator	Notes
EL51	Might and Power	8013-07/90-103	Aug 1990	Stored Off Hire, Islington	Rail First Asset Management	RFAM silver & blue	N/A	Stored Islington, for sale
EL52	Light Fingers	8013-07/90-104	Sep 1990	Stored Off Hire, Goulburn	Rail First Asset Management	RFAM silver & blue	N/A	Stored Goulburn, for sale
EL53	Northerly	8013-07/90-105	Oct 1990	Stored, Off Hire, Islington	Rail First Asset Management	RFAM silver & blue	N/A	Stored Islington, for sale
EL54	Bonecrusher	8013-07/90-106	Nov 1990	Stored, Off Hire, Islington	Rail First Asset Management	RFAM silver & blue	N/A	Stored Islington, for sale
EL55	Kensei	8013-07/90-107	Dec 1991	Stored, Off Hire, Islington	Rail First Asset Management	RFAM silver & blue	N/A	Stored Islington, for sale
EL56	Doriemus	8013-07/90-108	Jan 1991	Stored Off Hire, Islington	Rail First Asset Management	RFAM silver & blue	N/A	Stored Islington, for sale
EL57	Gunsynd	8013-07/90-109	Mar 1991	Stored Off Hire, Islington	Rail First Asset Management	RFAM silver & blue	N/A	Stored Islington, for sale
EL58	Kingston Rule	8013-07/90-110	Apr 1991	Stored Off Hire, Goulburn	Rail First Asset Management	RFAM silver & blue	N/A	Stored Goulburn, for sale
EL59	N/A	8013-07/90-111	May 1991	Scrapped	National Rail	AN Green & gold	N/A	Destroyed in Mt Christie Derailment in 1997
EL60	Octagonal	8013-07/90-112	Jun 1991	Stored Off Hire, Goulburn	Rail First Asset Management	RFAM silver & blue	N/A	Stored Goulburn, for sale
EL61	Ethereal	8013-07/90-113	Jul 1991	Scrapped	Rail First Asset Management	RFAM silver & blue	N/A	Damaged in collision with truck at Vite Vite in 2021 whilst on lease to SCT, was scrapped at Islington Workshops for parts
EL62	Archer	8013-07/90-114	Aug 1991	Stored Off Hire, Goulburn	Rail First Asset Management	RFAM silver & blue	N/A	Stored Goulburn, for sale
EL63	Saintly	8013-07/90-115	Sep 1991	Stored Off Hire, Goulburn	Rail First Asset Management	RFAM silver & blue	N/A	Stored Goulburn, for sale
EL64	Super Impose	8031-07/90-116	Oct 1991	Stored Off Hire, Goulburn	Rail First Asset Management	RFAM silver & blue	N/A	Stored Goulburn, for sale
