= Chicago Freight Car Leasing Company =

American railcar leasing company

- Website: chicagofreightcar.com

The Chicago Freight Car Leasing Company (reporting marks CRDX, GMIX) provides railcar leasing and management to companies throughout North America for a variety of commodities, including agricultural & food products; chemical & processed mineral products; metals, ores, aggregates, mineral rock/stone, and petroleum products. Chicago Freight Car Leasing is a subsidiary of Sasser Family Holdings, Inc.. Other related companies under Sasser Family Holdings include Union Leasing, CF Asia Pacific, CFCL Australia, CF Rail Services, and NxGen Rail.

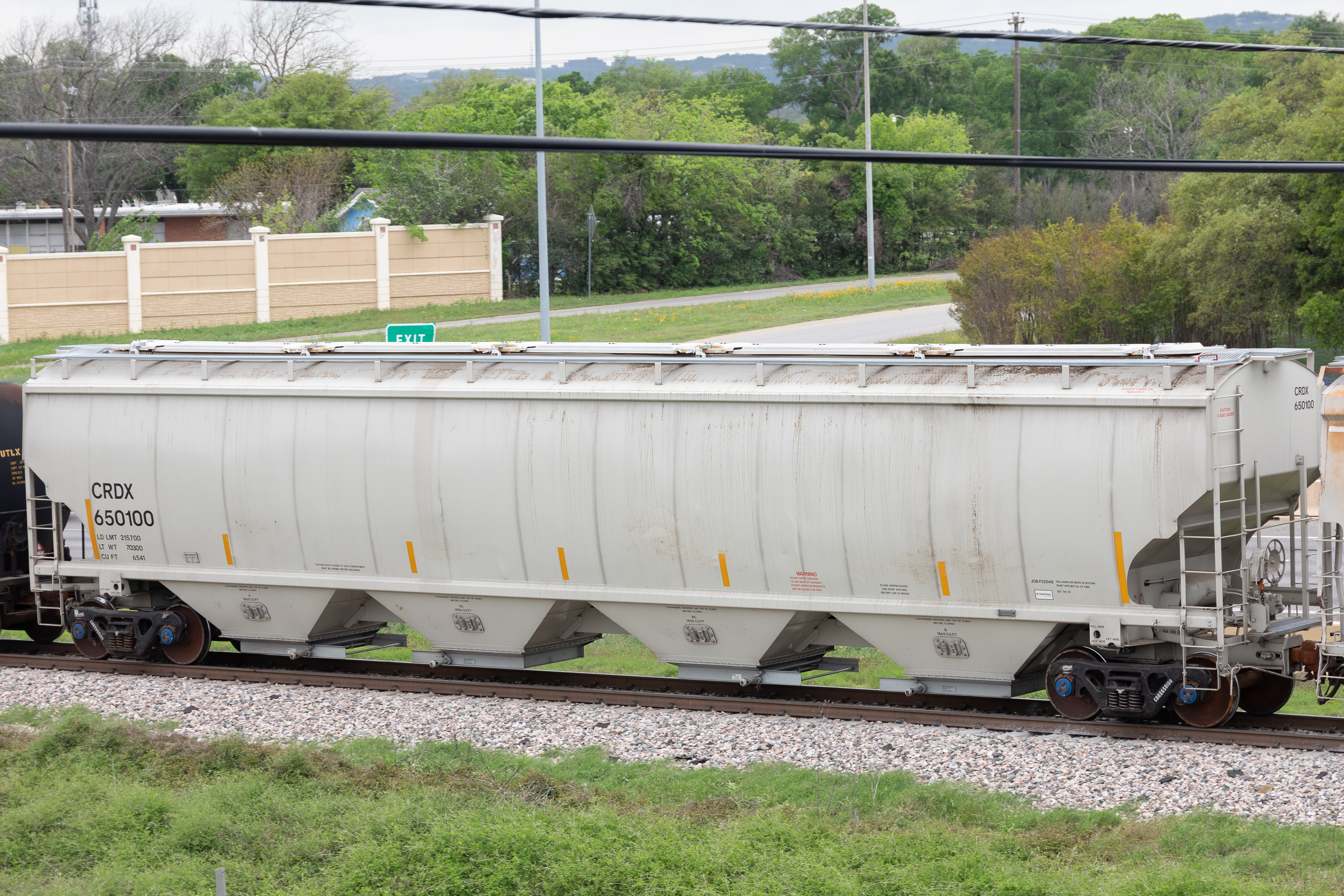
A Chicago Freight Car Leasing Company covered hopper. The company uses the CRDX and GMIX reporting marks.

== Australia ==
A daughter company, CFCL Australia, owns and leases the largest private fleet of locomotives and wagons in the Australian market. The company was established in response to the privatization of the former state-based railways in that country.
