= Victorian Railways Dd class =

Class of Australian 4-6-0 and 58 Australian 4-6-2T steam locomotives

Victorian Railways D^{D} class
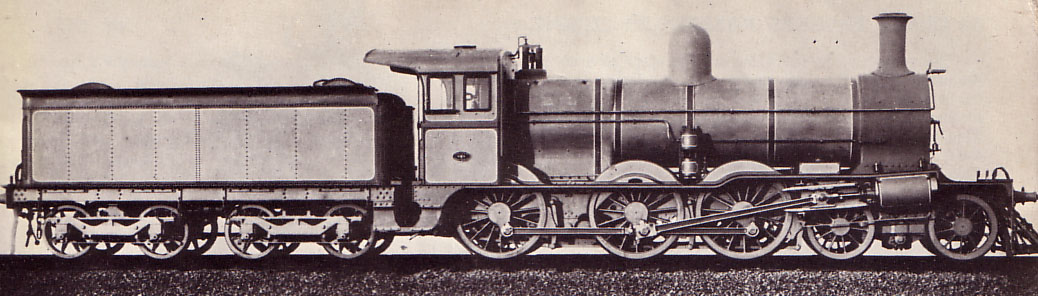
- VR photo of D^{D} 590 as built, 1902
Type and origin
- Power type: Steam
- Builder: Newport Workshops (138); Ballarat North Workshops (8); Bendigo Workshops (8); Baldwin Locomotive Works (20); Beyer, Peacock & Company (20); Walkers (20); Thompsons Ltd, Castlemaine (40); Phoenix Foundry, Ballarat (7)
- Serial number: Phoenix: 350-356; Beyer, Peacock & Company: 5535-5554; Walkers: 197-216, Thompsons: 1-40
Specifications
- Configuration
  - Whyte: 4-6-0
- Gauge: 5 ft 3 in (1,600 mm)
- Driver dia.: 61 in (1.549 m)
- Length: 57 ft 4 3/4 in (17.49 m)
- Axle load: 13 long tons 0 cwt (29,100 lb or 13.2 t)
- Adhesive weight: 38 long tons 6 cwt (85,800 lb or 38.9 t)
- Loco weight: 53 long tons 0 cwt (118,700 lb or 53.9 t)
- Tender weight: 41 long tons 16 cwt (93,600 lb or 42.5 t)
- Total weight: 94 long tons 16 cwt (212,400 lb or 96.3 t)
- Fuel type: Coal
- Fuel capacity: 5 long tons 0 cwt (11,200 lb or 5.1 t)
- Water cap.: 4,220 imp gal (19,200 L; 5,070 US gal)
- Firebox
  - Grate area: 21.2 sq ft (1.97 m^{2})
- Boiler pressure: 175 lbf/in^{2} (1.21 MPa)
- Heating surface: 1,375 sq ft (127.7 m^{2})
- Cylinders: Two, outside
- Cylinder size: 18 in × 26 in (457 mm × 660 mm)
Performance figures
- Tractive effort: 20,530 lbf (91.3 kN) at 85% boiler pressure
Career
- Number in class: 261

The D^{D} class (later reclassified into D^{1}, D^{2} and D^{3} subclasses) is a passenger and mixed traffic steam locomotive that ran on Victorian Railways from 1902 to 1974. Originally introduced on mainline express passenger services, they were quickly superseded by the much larger A^{2} class and were relegated to secondary and branch line passenger and goods service, where they gave excellent service for the next fifty years. The D^{D} design was adapted into a 4-6-2T tank locomotive for suburban passenger use, the D^{DE} (later D^{4}) class. They were the most numerous locomotive class on the VR, with a total of 261 D^{D} and 58 $\mathrm{D^D_E}$ locomotives built.

== History ==
By 1900, Victoria's express passenger locomotive fleet was almost exclusively made up of 4-4-0 designs of the Old A, New A, and the most recent AA class. These locomotives reflected contemporary British locomotive practice (as did the VR's fleet of 0-6-0 goods locomotives), in no small part due to the Victorian Government having appointed, in 1884, a Midland Railway manager, Richard Speight, as its first Chief Railways Commissioner. The commissioners then asked British locomotive engineer Edward Jeffreys to design five standard types of locos, in partnership with the British locomotive manufacturer (Kitson & Company of Leeds).

At the turn of the century, in what marked a major shift in policy, the recently appointed VR Commissioner, John Mathieson, set up a Locomotive Design Section for in-house development of future motive power. The D^{D} class locomotives were the first product of this exercise. A 4-6-0 design equipped with 5 ft 1 in driving wheels, saturated steam boiler and Belpaire firebox, the D^{D} reflected the considerable talent of VR's design team, which included ex-Beyer, Peacock & Company recruit Eugene Siepen, future VR Chief Mechanical Engineer Alfred Smith, and Rolling Stock Branch manager Thomas Woodroffe.

=== Production ===
The first D^{D} was number 560, constructed at the Victorian Railways' Newport Workshops and entering service in 1902. It was followed by engines 582 to 700, evens only, all constructed at Newport with the exception of 602, 604, 606, 608, 610, 632 and 634. These seven engines were notable as the last locomotives to be built by Ballarat's Phoenix Foundry, which had been the main supplier of locomotives to the VR for over thirty years. That was because the conservative Irvine government sought to reduce the costs of locomotive construction, and Newport Workshops was asked to tender for the construction of the D^{D} class locomotives. A fierce tender war between Newport and Phoenix eventually resulted in a Royal Commission, which found that Newport could produce a locomotive for £3,364, some £497 cheaper than the Phoenix Foundry. Phoenix produced just seven D^{D} locomotives and received no further orders, going into voluntary liquidation a year later.

Engines 702 to 796, again evens only, were delivered as tank engines of the $\mathrm{D^D_E}$ class up to the end of 1910. By this point the odds/evens locomotive numbering scheme had been abandoned, so the last nine of the batch were delivered as 701–717 to start filling gaps.

As part of the competitive tendering process, in early 1912 contracts were signed with each of Beyer, Peacock & Company of Manchester, England, Baldwin Locomotive Works of the US, Walkers Limited of Maryborough, Queensland and Austral Otis, to compare against the cost of building engines at Newport Workshops. Ritchie Brothers of Sydney had also tendered but failed to win any of the orders. The contracts were for 20 engines each, with rights to a 20-engine extension and the possibility of up to a total of 100 engines. Respectively, Beyer, Peacock & Company delivered engines 531–569, Baldwin delivered 571-609 and Newport 611-649 (plus tank engine 719) in 1912. The following year saw Walkers delivered 651-689 while Newport supplied tank engines 721–749. Austral Otis encountered difficulties and withdrew from the contract in November 1912, leading to that contract being re-offered.

From 1914 newly delivered engines were consecutively numbered. Between 1914 and 1919 Newport delivered three batches of 20 engines each, numbered 873–912, 943-962 and 1013–1032, at a rate of 20 per year except the final two, delivered in 1918 and 1919 respectively.

The firm Thompsons & Co successfully won the contract for the 20 engines not being constructed by Austral Otis, and these were delivered from the end of 1914 numbered 893–912. A repeat order was placed in 1916 with deliveries of 963–982, and work had started on a further 20 engines when pressures of World War I led to the firm abandoning the remainder of the D^{D} contract extensions. The parts already constructed were forwarded to Victorian Railways workshops, initially with five each being built at Bendigo and Ballarat (1033-1037 and 1038-1042 respectively), and the next ten were split between Newport (1043–1046), Bendigo (1047–1049) and Ballarat (1050–1052). These three workshops turned out virtually all subsequent locomotives for the Victorian railway system until the post-war era. (Some references exist to a further ten Thompsons engines, but no evidence is available to support the claim.)

=== Regular service ===
D^{D} class locomotives were initially assigned to hauling the Adelaide Express over the steep gradients between Melbourne and Ballarat, but were soon seen on mainline passenger services on a number of lines.

The first years of the 20th century saw on the VR (as elsewhere in the world) a considerable increase in both the amount of traffic and the size and weight of rolling stock being hauled. In 1907, the D^{D} class was supplanted by the much larger and more powerful A^{2} class on principal mainline services. However, with their light axle load (just 12 t 10 cwt in their original form), they were quickly reassigned to the VR's branchline network, where they became a fixture for the next fifty years.

From July until September 1918, 1032 was loaned to the South Australian Railways for trails against a Rx class operating from Adelaide to Murray Bridge and Victor Harbor.

=== Commissioner's engines ===
With their light axle load and express passenger speed, the D^{D} was also an ideal choice as motive power for the Victorian Railways Commissioner's train (used to carry the VR Commissioners on inspection tours to every corner of the VR network). In January 1917, Commissioners' locomotive No. 100, a 2-4-0 built in 1872, was scrapped and replaced with the brand new D^{D} 980 from Thompsons Foundry in Castlemaine. It was later renumbered D^{D} 718, D^{D} 600 and D^{1} 600, until March 1937 when it was placed into normal service as D^{1} 576, operating until 1959. There is photographic evidence of D^{1} 600 as Commissioners' Engine throughout the 1930s in the K.V. Scott collection. The new Commissioners engine from 1937 was D^{3} 683, specially fitted with an electric headlight (Mort Clark Bulletin Article) and in August 1950 it was replaced by D^{3} 639. 639 herself was withdrawn in July 1956 and replaced with D^{3} 658, however 639's numbers were transferred to 658. D^{3} 639 (658) was replaced by new 40 M.P.H, Clyde EMD diesel-electric Y 123 in January 1964. In August 1968 new diesel-electric Y 175 geared for 60 M.P.H. running took over until the Commissioners' Train was discontinued about 1979/80. In 1983 new Chief General Manager Mr. John Hearsch reinstated the Inspection Train with Clyde diesel-electric T 410. The Inspection train was discontinued after Hearsch left for Queensland Rail circa 1991.

=== D^{D}_{E} tank engine ===
Victorian Railways $\mathrm{D^D_E}$ class
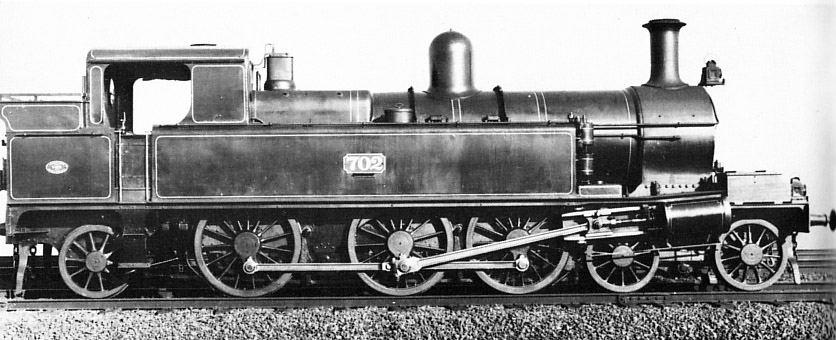
- Victorian Railways photograph of $\mathrm{D^D_E}$ 702, circa 1910
Type and origin
- Power type: Steam
- Builder: VR Newport Workshops (all 58)
Specifications
- Configuration
  - Whyte: 4-6-2T
- Gauge: 5 ft 3 in (1,600 mm)
- Length: 41 ft 10 1/2 in (12.76 m)
- Axle load: 14 long tons 10 cwt (32,500 lb or 14.7 t)
- Adhesive weight: 38 long tons 6 cwt (85,800 lb or 38.9 t)
- Loco weight: 69 long tons 0 cwt (154,600 lb or 70.1 t)
- Fuel type: Coal
- Fuel capacity: 2 long tons 15 cwt (6,200 lb or 2.8 t)
- Water cap.: 1,700 imp gal (7,700 L; 2,000 US gal)
Career
- Number in class: 58

The expansion of Melbourne's population into new suburbs early in the 20th century, and the delay of the suburban electrification project, saw the need for faster and more powerful steam locomotives for the suburban rail network. In 1908, the basic design of the D^{D} was adapted to create 4-6-2T tank locomotives, classed $\mathrm{D^D_E}$. They were put to work on longer and hillier suburban routes such as the Dandenong, Frankston, Upper Ferntree Gully, Williamstown, Werribee, Lilydale, Darling and Kew railway lines. A total of 58 were built between 1908 and 1913.

With electrification of the suburban network already on the drawing board (the first electrified lines opening in 1919), the $\mathrm{D^D_E}$ was designed for easy conversion to D^{D} tender engines in the event of electrification making them redundant. However, only two were modified in that way. Ten were scrapped in 1924, followed by another four in 1925, and $\mathrm{D^D_E}$ 704 was sold to the State Electricity Commission of Victoria. The remaining $\mathrm{D^D_E}$ locomotives remained in service on non-electrified outer suburban routes or found new roles as suburban goods locomotives or shunters. Some were allotted to Ballarat to work the short branch line to Newlyn.

=== Design improvements ===
During the construction of the D^{D} class, a number of changes were made. The first locomotives built featured low running plates with splashers over the driving wheels and a narrow cab. However, after 26 such examples were built the design was altered with high running plates mounted above the driving wheels and a more comfortable full-width pressed metal cab of Canadian design, a feature incorporated at the request of Victorian Railways Chief Commissioner and former Canadian Pacific Transportation Manager Thomas Tait. These became hallmarks of all subsequent VR steam locomotive designs.

Although the Dd was considered to be a successful design, it had a key shortcoming in that its boiler performance was not sufficient for the traffic demands being placed on it. In 1914, an experimental superheater was fitted to D^{D} 882 and was found to be very successful. Both D^{D} and A^{2} designs (both locomotive classes still under construction at the time) were modified with superheated boilers (with all of the existing A^{2} class locomotives eventually fitted with superheated boilers). Superheaters were also fitted to three of the $\mathrm{D^D_E}$ locomotives. Further D^{D} locomotives were also built with 19 in. diameter cylinders in place of the original 18 in. cylinders.

In 1923–4, D^{D} 1022 was experimentally fitted with pulverised brown coal (PBC) burning equipment. This followed experiments in 1913 with briquetted coal, which was tested on engines $\mathrm{D^D_E}$712 and A^{2}760.

=== Reclassing: D^{1}, D^{2} and D^{4} class ===
In 1922 a complex renumbering and reclassing of VR locomotives saw the D^{D} class split into two subclasses, the D^{1} class (comprising all the original saturated steam locomotives with 18 in. cylinders) and the D^{2} class (comprising superheated locomotives with either 18 or 19 in. cylinders).

With the introduction of a further D^{3} class in 1929, the $\mathrm{D^D_E}$ tank locomotives were reclassified as D^{4} class in 1929.

=== The D^{3} class ===
Victorian Railways D^{3} class
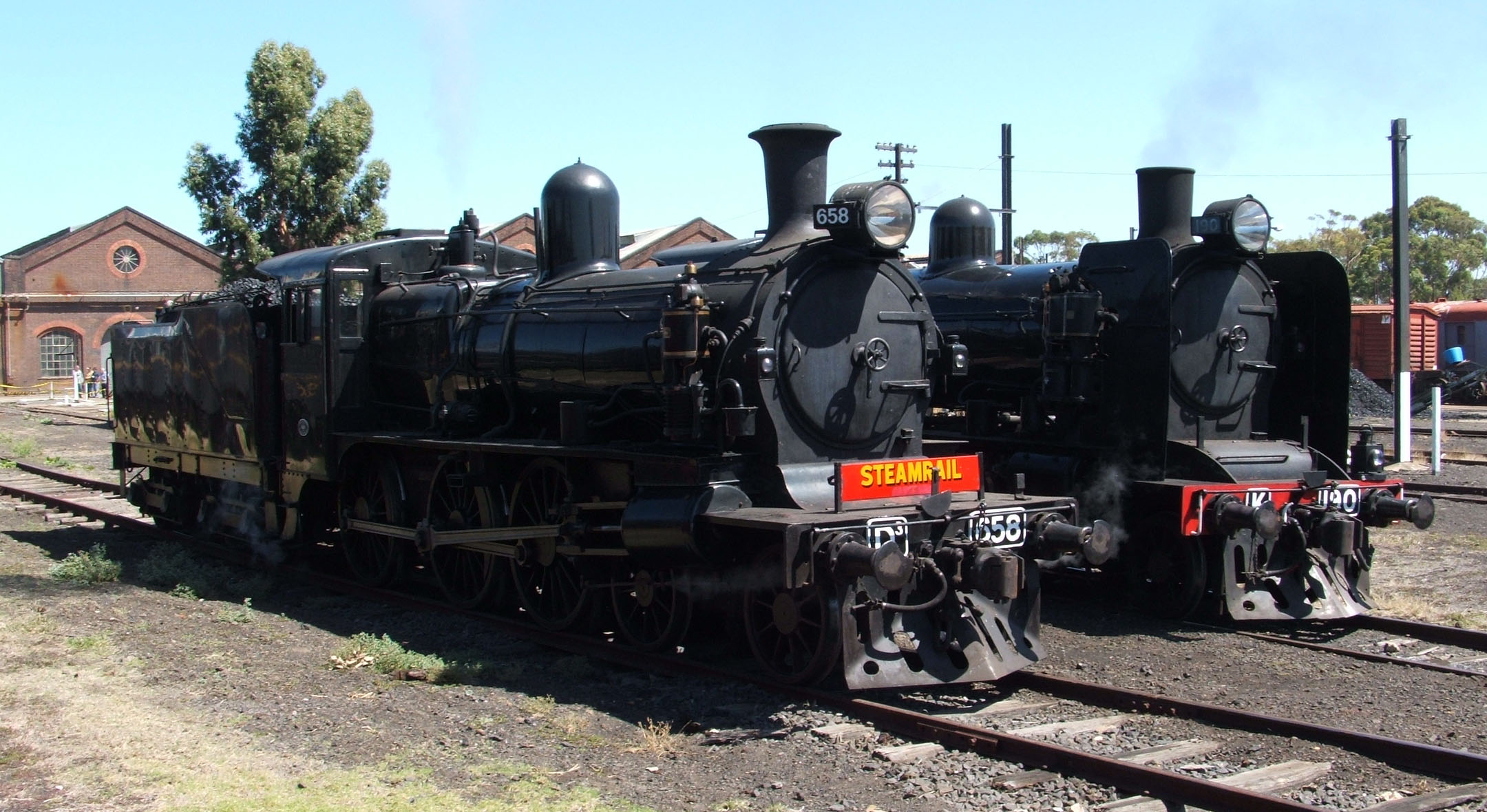
- Preserved D^{3} locomotive (left) adjacent to a K class locomotive, the boiler design of which formed the basis for the D^{3} boiler.
Type and origin
- Power type: steam
- Builder: VR Newport Workshops
- Number rebuilt: 94 (all from earlier D^{D} class locomotives)
Specifications
- Configuration
  - Whyte: 4-6-0
- Gauge: 5 ft 3 in (1,600 mm)
- Length: 58 ft 3 3/8 in (17.76 m)
- Axle load: 13 long tons 14 cwt (30,700 lb or 13.9 t)
- Total weight: 99 long tons 11 cwt (223,000 lb or 101.1 t)
- Firebox
  - Grate area: 25 sq ft (2.3 m^{2})
- Boiler pressure: 170 lbf/in^{2} (1.2 MPa)
- Heating surface: 1,592 sq ft (147.9 m^{2})
- Cylinder size: 19 in × 26 in (483 mm × 660 mm)
Performance figures
- Tractive effort: 22,600 lbf (101 kN) at 85% boiler pressure

Despite the success of superheating the D^{D} boiler, it was still somewhat limited in steam-raising capabilities. In 1922, a new design of 2-8-0 branch line goods locomotive, the K class, was introduced, with noticeably superior boiler performance to that of the D^{D}. In 1929, a D^{D} class locomotive was rebuilt with a larger boiler derived from the K class design. Based on the success of the rebuild, a further 93 D^{1}or D^{2} class locomotives were converted between 1929 and 1947, and classified D^{3}.

The D^{3}s were economical and efficient, but also renowned for their superior performance. They could be worked hard and were a favourite with crews. Although restricted to a maximum permitted speed of 60 mph (95 km/h), the D^{3}s were known to be capable of up to 75 mph (120 km/h).

With its low axle load and its ability to travel at a relatively high speed, the D^{3} helped to speed up passenger services on many lightly laid branch lines.

== Conversions and renumberings ==
In the period 1922-1927 well over half the fleet of D^{D} engines were renumbered, some twice, to clean up the mess left behind by the former odds/evens system and group engines of the same design into a consecutive series. In 1922 the proposed range was 490-799 for the D^{d} engines and 250-269 for the $\mathrm{D^D_E}$s, although in practice the ranges ended up as 500-799 and 250–287 with many numbers unfilled. Note the total of these groups would have been 350 engines, against 319 actually built. During this period two of the $\mathrm{D^D_E}$ engines were converted to tender engines, one sold and a further 17 scrapped.

In 1929 the D^{D} series was further segregated into D^{1}, D^{2} and D^{3} taking slots 500–645, 700-799 and 638-699 respectively. The first of the latter was D^{1} 542 to D^{3} 685 in 1929, followed by further examples of the D^{3} upgrade completed in 1930 to give the number range 675-689 and this was further extended to 670–699 by the end of 1932. Later conversions between 1933 and 1946 counted down from 669 to 607 in 1946, and finally 604 ex D^{2} 717 entering service in 1947. It is not clear which, if any, engines were intended to take the slots of D^{3} 605 or 606. Otherwise, the D^{D} group was reclassed as either D^{1} or D^{2} as appropriate, for the most part without renumbering. Unlike with other renumbering projects, engines converted to D^{3} and renumbered did not have their previous slots immediately filled.

In 1951, to make way for new J and R class engines being ordered under Operation Phoenix, the remaining D1 and D2 engines were renumbered to the range 561-579 and 580-604 respectively, with D^{3} 604 changing to 606. At the time, engines D^{1} 573, 578, 579 and 585 were still in service and retained their numbers, leaving gaps at numbers 575, 577, 583, 602 and 605. Assuming 585 would have been renumbered to replace D^{1} 572 withdrawn that year, the remaining open slots in each group correspond to the number of engines withdrawn in 1951.

=== Engine renumbering histories ===
These tables are based on:

- Cave, N., Buckland, J. & Beardsell, D. (2002) Steam Locomotives of the Victorian Railways - Volume 1 The First Fifty Years, Australian Railway Historical Society (Victorian Division), ISBN 1876677384
- Medlin, P. N. (2004) Victorian Railways Locomotives by Number (self-published, based on Victorian Railways' locomotive repair cards)
- ARHS Bulletin No 167, September 1951, page 115

==== D^{D} engines ====
Builder	No.	Footplate	Cab	Original D^{D}		D^{D} (2nd)		D^{D} (3rd)		D^{1} (1st)		D^{1} (2nd)		D^{1} (3rd)		D^{2} (1st)		D^{2} (2nd)		D^{3} (1st)		D^{3} (2nd)		Off register	Reason	Notes	Age
Newport	n/a			Ex $\mathrm{D^D_E}$ 712	1908	D^{D} 761	1922	D^{D} 532	1925															1934	Scrapped		26
Newport	n/a			Ex $\mathrm{D^D_E}$ 710	1908	D^{D} 763	1922	D^{D} 533	1926															1935	Scrapped		27
Newport	n/a	Low	Thin	D^{D} 560	1902	D^{D} 796	1926									D^{2} 796	1930			D^{3} 657	1935			1960	Scrapped	Fitted with high running plate and wide cab 1912	58
Newport	n/a	Low	Thin	D^{D} 582	1903					D^{1} 582	1929													1937	Scrapped	Fitted with high running plate and wide cab 1914	34
Newport	n/a	Low	Thin	D^{D} 584	1903																			1929	Scrapped	Fitted with high running plate and wide cab 1914	26
Newport	n/a	Medium	Thin	D^{D} 586	1903	D^{D} 799	1927									D^{2} 799	1931			D^{3} 658	1934	D^{3} 639	1956	1958	Preserved	In Service with Steamrail Newport; was named Spirit of Ballarat. High running plate and cab fitted when converted to D^{3} 658	55
Newport	n/a	Medium	Wide	D^{D} 588	1903																			1929	Scrapped	Dimboola accident March 1916	26
Newport	n/a	Medium	Wide	D^{D} 590	1904	D^{D} 798	1926									D^{2} 798	1929			D^{3} 661	1934			1958	Scrapped	n/a	54
Newport	n/a	Medium	Wide	D^{D} 592	1904																			1929	Scrapped		25
Newport	n/a	Medium	Wide	D^{D} 594	1904					D^{1} 594	19xx													1934	Scrapped		30
Newport	n/a	Medium	Wide	D^{D} 596	1904					D^{1} 596	1934													1934	Scrapped	Not clear if to D^{1} or scrapped as D^{D}	30
Newport	n/a	Medium	Wide	D^{D} 598	1904					D^{1} 598	1930													1941	Scrapped	Anderson collision May 1911	37
Newport	n/a	Medium	Wide	D^{D} 600	1904	D^{D} 535	1928			D^{1} 535	19xx													1928	Scrapped		24
Phoenix	350	Medium	Wide	D^{D} 602	1904					D^{1} 602	1929													1937	Scrapped		33
Phoenix	351	Medium	Wide	D^{D} 604	1904					D^{1} 604	19xx													1935	Scrapped		31
Phoenix	352	Medium	Wide	D^{D} 606	1904					D^{1} 606	19xx													1937	Scrapped		33
Phoenix	353	Medium	Wide	D^{D} 608	1904																			1929	Scrapped		25
Phoenix	354	Medium	Wide	D^{D} 610	1904																			1934	Scrapped	Collision 1921 with A^{2} 906	30
Newport	n/a	High	Wide	D^{D} 612	1904																			1929	Scrapped		25
Newport	n/a	High	Wide	D^{D} 614	1904																			1929	Scrapped	Moranding accident October 1907	25
Newport	n/a	High	Wide	D^{D} 616	1904																			1934	Scrapped	Trawalla accident February 1910	30
Newport	n/a	High	Wide	D^{D} 618	1904					D^{1} 618	19xx	D^{1} 501	1940	D^{1} 561	1951									1956	Scrapped		52
Newport	n/a	High	Wide	D^{D} 620	1904					D^{1} 620	1931	D^{1} 581	1941											1941	Scrapped	Wonthaggi collision August 1902, new cylinders fitted	37
Newport	n/a	High	Wide	D^{D} 622	1904																			1929	Scrapped	Drouin collision December 1918	25
Newport	n/a	High	Wide	D^{D} 624	1904																			1929	Scrapped		25
Newport	n/a			D^{D} 626	1905					D^{1} 626	19xx													1934	Scrapped	Anderson collision May 1911	29
Newport	n/a			D^{D} 628	1905					D^{1} 628	19xx													1934	Scrapped		29
Newport	n/a			D^{D} 630	1905	D^{D} 765	1925									D^{2} 765	19xx			D^{3} 646	1936			1964	Preserved	Was displayed at Maryborough, now at VGR Maldon	59
Phoenix	355	Medium	Wide	D^{D} 632	1904					D^{1} 632	19xx													1934	Scrapped		30
Phoenix	356	Medium	Wide	D^{D} 634	1904					D^{1} 634	1931	D^{1} 505	1937											1941	Scrapped	St Arnaud collision May 1921	37
Newport	n/a			D^{D} 636	1905					D^{1} 636	1929													1934	Scrapped		29
Newport	n/a			D^{D} 638	1905					D^{1} 638	1929					D^{2} 722	1934	D^{2} 590	1951					1955	Scrapped		50
Newport	n/a			D^{D} 640	1905					D^{1} 640	1929	D^{1} 509	1936			D^{2} 735	1937							1944	Scrapped		39
Newport	n/a			D^{D} 642	1905					D^{1} 642	19xx													1938	Scrapped		33
Newport	n/a			D^{D} 644	1905	D^{D} 766	1926									D^{2} 766	1929	D^{2} 599	1951					1959	Scrapped		54
Newport	n/a			D^{D} 646	1905					D^{1} 646	1931	D^{1} 519	1934											1941	Scrapped		36
Newport	n/a			D^{D} 648	1905					D^{1} 648	19xx	D^{1} 599	1933											1937	Scrapped		32
Newport	n/a			D^{D} 650	1906					D^{1} 650	19xx													1933	Scrapped		27
Newport	n/a			D^{D} 652	1906					D^{1} 652	1930	D^{1} 590	1938											1941	Scrapped	1938 TBC	35
Newport	n/a			D^{D} 654	1906					D^{1} 654	19xx	D^{1} 589	1933											1934	Scrapped	St Arnaud collision May 1921	28
Newport	n/a			D^{D} 656	1906																			1929	Scrapped		23
Newport	n/a			D^{D} 658	1906																			1929	Scrapped		23
Newport	n/a			D^{D} 660	1906					D^{1} 660	19xx	D^{1} 595	1934											1934	Scrapped		28
Newport	n/a			D^{D} 662	1906					D^{1} 662	19xx	D^{1} 592	1933											1941	Scrapped		35
Newport	n/a			D^{D} 664	1906	D^{D} 768	1926									D^{2} 768	1931			D^{3} 648	1935			1957	Scrapped		51
Newport	n/a			D^{D} 666	1907																			1929	Scrapped	Scrap date TBC	22
Newport	n/a			D^{D} 668	1907	D^{D} 769	1925									D^{2} 769	1929			D^{3} 613	1944			1966	Scrapped		59
Newport	n/a			D^{D} 670	1907					D^{1} 670	1929	D^{1} 560	1932											1955	Scrapped		48
Newport	n/a			D^{D} 672	1907																			1929	Scrapped		22
Newport	n/a			D^{D} 674	1907	D^{D} 770	1926									D^{2} 770	1929			D^{3} 644	1935			1962	Scrapped		55
Newport	n/a			D^{D} 676	1907	D^{D} 771	1925									D^{2} 771	1930			D^{3} 660	1934			1952	Scrapped		45
Newport	n/a			D^{D} 678	1907	D^{D} 773	1925									D^{2} 773	1932			D^{3} 652	1935			1957	Scrapped		50
Newport	n/a			D^{D} 680	1907	D^{D} 785	1925									D^{2} 785	19xx							1933	Scrapped		26
Newport	n/a			D^{D} 682	1907	D^{D} 791	1926									D^{2} 791	19xx			D^{3} 643	1936			1958	Scrapped		51
Newport	n/a			D^{D} 684	1907	D^{D} 792	1926									D^{2} 792	19xx			D^{3} 663	1934			1959	Scrapped	1926 TBC	52
Newport	n/a			D^{D} 686	1908	D^{D} 774	1925									D^{2} 774	19xx			D^{3} 655	1935			1961	Scrapped		53
Newport	n/a			D^{D} 688	1908	D^{D} 775	1924									D^{2} 775	1930			D^{3} 651	1935			1962	Scrapped		54
Newport	n/a			D^{D} 690	1908	D^{D} 797	1925									D^{2} 797	19xx			D^{3} 653	1935			1964	Preserved	On display at Ballarat North Workshops. Source document says converted to D^{2} 1926 but that can't be right.	56
Newport	n/a			D^{D} 692	1908	D^{D} 668	1931			D^{1} 668	1929	D^{1} 540	1931											1944	Scrapped		36
Newport	n/a			D^{D} 694	1908	D^{D} 674	1926			D^{1} 674	1929	D^{1} 586	1932											1944	Scrapped		36
Newport	n/a			D^{D} 696	1908	D^{D} 676	1925			D^{1} 513	1930					D^{2} 725	1934	D^{2} 592	1951					1954	Scrapped		46
Newport	n/a			D^{D} 698	1908	D^{D} 677	1925			D^{1} 677	1929	D^{1} 517	1931											1938	Scrapped		30
Newport	n/a			D^{D} 700	1908	D^{D} 678	1925																	1929	Scrapped		21
Beyer, Peacock & Co.	5535			D^{D} 531	1912	D^{D} 557	1925			D^{1} 557	1929													1937	Scrapped		25
Beyer, Peacock & Co.	5536			D^{D} 533	1912	D^{D} 558	1925			D^{1} 558	1931									D^{3} 604	1947	D^{3} 606	1951	1960	Scrapped		48
Beyer, Peacock & Co.	5537			D^{D} 535	1912	D^{D} 562	1925			D^{1} 562	19xx													1937	Scrapped		25
Beyer, Peacock & Co.	5538			D^{D} 537	1912	D^{D} 564	1925			D^{1} 564	19xx													1941	Scrapped		29
Beyer, Peacock & Co.	5539			D^{D} 539	1912	D^{D} 566	1925			D^{1} 566	19xx													1936	Scrapped		24
Beyer, Peacock & Co.	5540			D^{D} 541	1912	D^{D} 568	19xx			D^{1} 568	1924					D^{2} 730	1937	D^{2} 594	19xx					1953	Scrapped		41
Beyer, Peacock & Co.	5541			D^{D} 543	1912	D^{D} 570	1925			D^{1} 570	19xx													1933	Scrapped		21
Beyer, Peacock & Co.	5542			D^{D} 545	1912	D^{D} 572	1925			D^{1} 572	1933													1951	Scrapped		39
Beyer, Peacock & Co.	5543			D^{D} 547	1912	D^{D} 574	1925			D^{1} 574	1929					D^{2} 732	1937	D^{2} 595	1951					1960	Scrapped		48
Beyer, Peacock & Co.	5544			D^{D} 549	1912	D^{D} 576	1925			D^{1} 576	19xx													1937	Scrapped		25
Beyer, Peacock & Co.	5545			D^{D} 551	1912	D^{D} 577	1926			D^{1} 577	19xx													1937	Scrapped		25
Beyer, Peacock & Co.	5546			D^{D} 553	1912	D^{D} 578	1925			D^{1} 578	19xx													1960	Scrapped		48
Beyer, Peacock & Co.	5547			D^{D} 555	1912	D^{D} 761	1925																	1929	Scrapped		17
Beyer, Peacock & Co.	5548			D^{D} 557	1912	D^{D} 580	1925	D^{D} 795	1925							D^{2} 795	1929	D^{2} 604	1951					1956	Sold, now Preserved	To Australian Paper Manufacturers Ltd. as a shunter for the Maryvale paper mill. Now on display at ARHS Newport Museum	44
Beyer, Peacock & Co.	5549			D^{D} 559	1912					D^{1} 559	1929													1935	Scrapped		23
Beyer, Peacock & Co.	5550			D^{D} 561	1912					D^{1} 561	1931													1935	Scrapped		23
Beyer, Peacock & Co.	5551			D^{D} 563	1912					D^{1} 563	1929					D^{2} 728	1934	D^{2} 593	1951					1958	Scrapped		46
Beyer, Peacock & Co.	5552			D^{D} 565	1912					D^{1} 565	19xx									D^{3} 683	1930			1963	Scrapped		51
Beyer, Peacock & Co.	5553			D^{D} 567	1912					D^{1} 567	19xx													1941	Scrapped		29
Beyer, Peacock & Co.	5554			D^{D} 569	1912					D^{1} 569	1929													1934	Scrapped		22
Baldwin				D^{D} 571	1912					D^{1} 571	1929													1953	Scrapped		41
Baldwin				D^{D} 573	1912					D^{1} 573	1931													1937	Scrapped		25
Baldwin				D^{D} 575	1912					D^{1} 575	1929													1954	Scrapped		42
Baldwin				D^{D} 577	1912	D^{D} 762	1926									D^{2} 762	1929			D^{3} 697	1932			1954	Scrapped		42
Baldwin				D^{D} 579	1912					D^{1} 579	19xx													1952	Scrapped		40
Baldwin				D^{D} 581	1912					D^{1} 581	19xx									D^{3} 632	1939			1958	Scrapped		46
Baldwin				D^{D} 583	1912					D^{1} 583	1929													1934	Scrapped		22
Baldwin				D^{D} 585	1912					D^{1} 585	1929									D^{3} 631	1940			1956	Scrapped		44
Baldwin				D^{D} 587	1912					D^{1} 587	19xx					D^{2} 702	1934	D^{2} 581	1951					1952	Scrapped		40
Baldwin				D^{D} 589	1912																			1929	Scrapped		17
Baldwin				D^{D} 591	1912					D^{1} 591	1929													1941	Scrapped		29
Baldwin				D^{D} 593	1912					D^{1} 593	1929			D^{1} 574	1951									1956	Scrapped		44
Baldwin				D^{D} 595	1912					D^{1} 595	1929													1933	Scrapped		21
Baldwin				D^{D} 597	1912					D^{1} 597	1930									D^{3} 635	1939			1964	Preserved	On display at ARHS Newport Museum	52
Baldwin				D^{D} 599	1912	D^{D} 763	1926									D^{2} 763	1929							1933	Scrapped	1929 TBC	21
Baldwin				D^{D} 601	1912					D^{1} 601	1929													1951	Scrapped		39
Baldwin				D^{D} 603	1912					D^{1} 603	19xx					D^{2} 721	1934			D^{3} 625	1940			1957	Scrapped		45
Baldwin				D^{D} 605	1912	D^{D} 764	1925																	1929	Scrapped		17
Baldwin				D^{D} 607	1912																			1935	Scrapped	Scrap date TBC	23
Baldwin				D^{D} 609	1912											D^{2} 717	1928			D^{3} 607	1946			1954	Scrapped		42
Newport	n/a			D^{D} 611	1912																			1933	Scrapped		21
Newport	n/a			D^{D} 613	1912					D^{1} 613	19xx	D^{1} 543	1944	D^{1} 569	1951									1956	Scrapped		44
Newport	n/a			D^{D} 615	1912											D^{2} 615	1934	D^{2} 701	19xx	D^{3} 608	1946			1963	Preserved	Was displayed at Stawell, now at Steamrail Ballarat	51
Newport	n/a			D^{D} 617	1912					D^{1} 617	1932	D^{1} 502	1940											1943	Scrapped		31
Newport	n/a			D^{D} 619	1912					D^{1} 619	19xx													1937	Scrapped		25
Newport	n/a			D^{D} 621	1912					D^{1} 621	19xx	D^{1} 585	1940											1952	Scrapped		40
Newport	n/a			D^{D} 623	1912					D^{1} 623	19xx													1935	Scrapped		23
Newport	n/a			D^{D} 625	1912					D^{1} 625	1930													1937	Scrapped		25
Newport	n/a			D^{D} 627	1912	D^{D} 718	1928									D^{2} 718	1931	D^{2} 589	1951					1955	Scrapped		43
Newport	n/a			D^{D} 629	1912					D^{1} 629	1929	D^{1} 501	1938			D^{2}	1939			D^{3} 633	1939			1958	Scrapped		46
Newport	n/a			D^{D} 631	1912																			1929	Scrapped		17
Newport	n/a			D^{D} 633	1912					D^{1} 633	19xx									D^{3} 688	1930	D^{3} 640	1964	1964	Preserved	Was displayed at Rosebud, now at Steamrail Ballarat via West Coast Railway	52
Newport	n/a			D^{D} 635	1912					D^{1} 635	1929													1934	Scrapped		22
Newport	n/a			D^{D} 637	1912					D^{1} 637	1931					D^{2} 710	1934			D^{3} 628	1940			1954	Scrapped		42
Newport	n/a			D^{D} 639	1912	D^{D} 787	1925									D^{2} 787	1929	D^{2} 601	1951					1954	Scrapped		42
Newport	n/a			D^{D} 641	1912					D^{1} 641	1932	D^{1} 505	1933											1936	Scrapped		24
Newport	n/a			D^{D} 643	1912					D^{1} 643	19xx	D^{1} 515	1934											1936	Scrapped		24
Newport	n/a			D^{D} 645	1912					D^{1} 645	19xx	D^{1} 565	1931											1937	Scrapped		25
Newport	n/a			D^{D} 647	1912					D^{1} 647	19xx									D^{3} 686	1930			1964	Scrapped		52
Newport	n/a			D^{D} 649	1912	D^{D} 767	194									D^{2} 767	1931							1952	Scrapped		40
Walkers	197			D^{D} 651	1913					D^{1} 651	1929	D^{1} 584	1932											1941	Scrapped		28
Walkers	198			D^{D} 653	1913					D^{1} 653	19xx					D^{2} 719	1934			D^{3} 615	1944			1960	Scrapped		47
Walkers	199			D^{D} 655	1913					D^{1} 655	1932	D^{1} 547	1934											1941	Scrapped		28
Walkers	200			D^{D} 657	1913					D^{1} 657	19xx													1934	Scrapped		21
Walkers	201			D^{D} 659	1913															D^{3} 684	1930			1964	Preserved		51
Walkers	202			D^{D} 661	1913					D^{1} 661	1929													1933	Scrapped		20
Walkers	203			D^{D} 663	1913					D^{1} 663	19xx	D^{1} 588	1932											1941	Scrapped		28
Walkers	204			D^{D} 665	1913					D^{1} 665	1931													1941	Scrapped		28
Walkers	205			D^{D} 667	1913	D^{D} 784	1925									D^{2} 784	19xx			D^{3} 636	1941			1960	Scrapped		47
Walkers	206			D^{D} 669	1913	D^{D} 548	1932			D^{1} 548	19xx													1941	Scrapped		28
Walkers	207			D^{D} 671	1913					D^{1} 671	1929	D^{1} 566	19xx							D^{3} 682	1930			1964	Scrapped		51
Walkers	208			D^{D} 673	1913	D^{D} 549	1932			D^{1} 549	19xx													1941	Scrapped		28
Walkers	209			D^{D} 675	1913	D^{D} 786	1925									D^{2} 786	1932			D^{3} 623	1940			1962	Scrapped		49
Walkers	210			D^{D} 677	1913	D^{D} 772	1925									D^{2} 772	19xx			D^{3} 618	1942			1960	Scrapped		47
Walkers	211			D^{D} 679	1913	D^{D} 519	19xx																	1933	Scrapped		20
Walkers	212			D^{D} 681	1913	D^{D} 719	1928									D^{2} 719	1933							1933	Scrapped		20
Walkers	213			D^{D} 683	1913			D^{D} 505	1929	D^{1} 505	1930													1933	Scrapped		20
Walkers	214			D^{D} 685	1913	D^{D} 542	19xx			D^{1} 542	19xx													1936	Scrapped		23
Walkers	215			D^{D} 687	1913	D^{D} 644	1929			D^{1} 644	1929	D^{1} 580	1932											1941	Scrapped		28
Walkers	216			D^{D} 689	1913	D^{D} 649	1925			D^{1} 649	19xx					D^{2} 720	1934							1952	Scrapped		39
Newport	n/a			D^{D} 873	1914	D^{D} 500	1923			D^{1} 500	19xx													1952	Scrapped		38
Newport	n/a			D^{D} 874	1914	D^{D} 501	1925			D^{1} 501	1930					D^{2} 724	1937			D^{3} 659	1934			1972	Scrapped		58
Newport	n/a			D^{D} 875	1914	D^{D} 502	1925													D^{3} 634	1939			1956	Scrapped		42
Newport	n/a			D^{D} 876	1914	D^{D} 503	1923	D^{D} 776	1925							D^{2} 776	1929			D^{3} 619	1941			1964	Preserved	Was displayed at Bendigo North, now at Maldon VGR via Great Northern	50
Newport	n/a			D^{D} 877	1914	D^{D} 504	1923			D^{1} 504	1929													1943	Scrapped		29
Newport	n/a			D^{D} 878	1914			D^{D} 503	1926	D^{1} 503	1926													1944	Scrapped		30
Newport	n/a			D^{D} 879	1914	D^{D} 506	1924			D^{1} 506	1929													1941	Scrapped		27
Newport	n/a			D^{D} 880	1914	D^{D} 507	1923	D^{D} 793	1926							D^{2} 793	1929			D^{3} 617	1944			1954	Scrapped		40
Newport	n/a			D^{D} 881	1914	D^{D} 508	1923	D^{D} 777	1925							D^{2} 777	1929							1933	Scrapped		19
Newport	n/a			D^{D} 882	1914	D^{D} 509	1924	D^{D} 720	1925							D^{2} 720	19xx			D^{3} 668	1933			1953	Scrapped		39
Newport	n/a			D^{D} 883	1914	D^{D} 505	1925									D^{2} 712	1928			D^{3} 627	1940			1954	Scrapped		40
Newport	n/a			D^{D} 884	1914	D^{D} 511	1923			D^{1} 510	1931													1936	Scrapped		22
Newport	n/a			D^{D} 885	1914			D^{D} 508	1925	D^{1} 508	1931													1936	Scrapped		22
Newport	n/a			D^{D} 886	1914	D^{D} 513	1923									D^{2} 713	1929							1952	Scrapped	1929 in lieu of 1928?	38
Newport	n/a			D^{D} 887	1914			D^{D} 509	1925							D^{2} 726	1934			D^{3} 629	1940			1964	Scrapped		50
Newport	n/a			D^{D} 888	1914	D^{D} 515	1923																	1933	Scrapped		19
Newport	n/a			D^{D} 889	1914	D^{D} 510	1924			D^{1} 510	19xx													1936	Scrapped		22
Newport	n/a			D^{D} 890	1914	D^{D} 517	1924									D^{2} 714	1928			D^{3} 616	1943			1960	Scrapped		46
Newport	n/a			D^{D} 891	1914	D^{D} 778	1925									D^{2} 778	1930			D^{3} 669	1933			1961	Scrapped		47
Newport	n/a			D^{D} 892	1914	D^{D} 519	1923			D^{1} 519	19xx					D^{2} 705	1929							1945	Scrapped		31
Thompsons	01			D^{D} 893	1914	D^{D} 520	1923	D^{D} 779	1925							D^{2} 779	1929			D^{3} 640	1937	D^{3} 688	1964	1964	Preserved	On display at Swan Hill. Was fitted with 688 plates due to that being the last D^{3} to haul the Swan Hill passenger train; since reverted.	50
Thompsons	02			D^{D} 894	1915	D^{D} 521	1924			D^{1} 521	19xx													1941	Scrapped		26
Thompsons	03			D^{D} 895	1915	D^{D} 780	1924									D^{2} 780	1929			D^{3} 609	1945			1960	Scrapped		45
Thompsons	04			D^{D} 896	1915	D^{D} 512	1925			D^{1} 512	1929					D^{2} 707	1929							1951	Scrapped		36
Thompsons	05			D^{D} 897	1915	D^{D} 524	1923	D^{D} 790	1925							D^{2} 790	19xx	D^{2} 603	1951					1954	Scrapped		39
Thompsons	06			D^{D} 898	1915	D^{D} 514	1925			D^{1} 514	19xx													1941	Scrapped		26
Thompsons	07			D^{D} 899	1915	D^{D} 516	1925			D^{1} 516	1931													1941	Scrapped		26
Thompsons	08			D^{D} 900	1915	D^{D} 781	1925									D^{2} 781	19xx			D^{3} 621	1940			1961	Scrapped		46
Thompsons	09			D^{D} 901	1915	D^{D} 518	1925			D^{1} 518	1930					D^{2} 731	1937			D^{3} 624	1940			1962	Scrapped		47
Thompsons	10			D^{D} 902	1915	D^{D} 529	1924			D^{1} 529	19xx									D^{3} 687	1930			1955	Scrapped		40
Thompsons	11			D^{D} 903	1915			D^{D} 520	1926	D^{1} 520	1931													1941	Scrapped		26
Thompsons	12			D^{D} 904	1915	D^{D} 522	1925	D^{D} 583	19xx	D^{1} 583	19xx					D^{2} 704	19xx							1951	Scrapped	Never ran as D^{1}; may have been renumbered not scrapped 1951?	36
Thompsons	13			D^{D} 905	1915	D^{D} 534	1922			D^{1} 534	19xx			D^{1} 566	1951									1957	Scrapped		42
Thompsons	14			D^{D} 906	1915	D^{D} 523	1925			D^{1} 523	19xx			D^{1} 564	1951									1941	Scrapped		26
Thompsons	15			D^{D} 907	1915	D^{D} 525	1925									D^{2} 700	1930	D^{2} 580	1951					1952	Scrapped		37
Thompsons	16			D^{D} 908	1915	D^{D} 526	1925			D^{1} 526	19xx													1941	Scrapped		26
Thompsons	17			D^{D} 909	1915	D^{D} 782	1924									D^{2} 782	19xx	D^{2} 600	1951					1960	Scrapped		45
Thompsons	18			D^{D} 910	1915	D^{D} 527	1925			D^{1} 527	19xx													1941	Scrapped		26
Thompsons	19			D^{D} 911	1915	D^{D} 546	1923	D^{D} 528	1925															1929	Scrapped		14
Thompsons	20			D^{D} 912	1915	D^{D} 530	1925			D^{1} 530	19xx					D^{2} 761	1930			D^{3} 614	1944			1953	Scrapped	Never ran as D^{1}	38
Newport	n/a			D^{D} 943	1915	D^{D} 783	1924									D^{2} 783	1929			D^{3} 641	1936			1964	Preserved	Was displayed at Beaufort, now at Steamrail Ballarat	49
Newport	n/a			D^{D} 944	1915	D^{D} 552	1924			D^{1} 552	1932													1941	Sold	To Australian Paper Manufacturers Ltd. as a shunter for the Maryvale paper mill.	26
Newport	n/a			D^{D} 945	1915	D^{D} 554	1924			D^{1} 554	19xx			D^{1} 572	1951									1952	Scrapped	Never ran as D^{1} 572	37
Newport	n/a			D^{D} 946	1915	D^{D} 556	1923			D^{1} 556	1929													1951	Scrapped		36
Newport	n/a			D^{D} 947	1915	D^{D} 536	1925			D^{1} 536	1929													1945	Scrapped		30
Newport	n/a			D^{D} 948	1915	D^{D} 537	1925	D^{D} 794	1926							D^{2} 794	1929			D^{3} 630	1940			1957	Scrapped		42
Newport	n/a			D^{D} 949	1915	D^{D} 538	1924			D^{1} 538	1931													1941	Scrapped		26
Newport	n/a			D^{D} 950	1915	D^{D} 566	1924	D^{D} 539	1925	D^{1} 539	1930			D^{1} 568	1951									1954	Scrapped		39
Newport	n/a			D^{D} 951	1915	D^{D} 568	1922	D^{D} 540	1924							D^{2} 711	1929	D^{2} 586	1951					1956	Scrapped		41
Newport	n/a			D^{D} 952	1915	D^{D} 570	1924	D^{D} 541	1925	D^{1} 541	19xx													1944	Scrapped		29
Newport	n/a			D^{D} 953	1915	D^{D} 572	1924			D^{1} 542	1924									D^{3} 685	1929			1962	Scrapped		47
Newport	n/a			D^{D} 954	1915	D^{D} 543	1925			D^{1} 543	19xx													1944	Scrapped		29
Newport	n/a			D^{D} 955	1915	D^{D} 544	1925			D^{1} 544	19xx			D^{1} 570	1951									1960	Scrapped		45
Newport	n/a			D^{D} 956	1915	D^{D} 545	1925									D^{2} 736	1937			D^{3} 610	1944			1958	Scrapped		43
Newport	n/a			D^{D} 957	1915	D^{D} 580	1924	D^{D} 789	1926							D^{2} 789	19xx			D^{3} 626	1940			1961	Scrapped		46
Newport	n/a			D^{D} 958	1915	D^{D} 691	1924									D^{2} 706	1929	D^{2} 584	1951					1953	Scrapped		38
Newport	n/a			D^{D} 959	1915	D^{D} 693	1924			D^{1} 522	1931					D^{2} 727	1937			D^{3} 612	1944			1960	Scrapped		45
Newport	n/a			D^{D} 960	1915	D^{D} 695	1923			D^{1} 695	1931					D^{2} 729	1937			D^{3} 611	1944			1962	Scrapped		47
Newport	n/a			D^{D} 961	1915	D^{D} 697	1924			D^{1} 697	1929	D^{1} 529	1931											1941	Scrapped		26
Newport	n/a			D^{D} 962	1915	D^{D} 699	1923	D^{D} 788	1925							D^{2} 788	19xx							1951	Scrapped		36
Thompsons	21			D^{D} 963	1916	D^{D} 701	1922			D^{1} 701	1929	D^{1} 528	19xx											1935	Scrapped		19
Thompsons	22			D^{D} 964	1916	D^{D} 702	1925			D^{1} 702	1929	D^{1} 546	19xx											1936	Scrapped		20
Thompsons	23			D^{D} 965	1916	D^{D} 547	1925			D^{1} 547	19xx													1935	Scrapped		19
Thompsons	24			D^{D} 966	1916	D^{D} 548	1925			D^{1} 703	19xx					D^{2} 703	1930	D^{2} 582	1951					1953	Scrapped	Never ran as D^{1}	37
Thompsons	25			D^{D} 967	1916	D^{D} 549	1925			D^{1} 549	19xx					D^{2} 709	1930							1951	Scrapped	Never ran as D^{1}	35
Thompsons	26			D^{D} 968	1916	D^{D} 550	1925			D^{1} 550	1929					D^{2} 737	1937	D^{2} 598	195x					1955	Scrapped		39
Thompsons	27			D^{D} 969	1916	D^{D} 551	1926			D^{1} 551	1932													1941	Scrapped		25
Thompsons	28			D^{D} 970	1916	D^{D} 708	1923									D^{2} 708	1930			D^{3} 620	1941			1953	Scrapped		37
Thompsons	29			D^{D} 971	1916	D^{D} 709	1923	D^{D} 512	19xx	D^{1} 512	19xx			D^{1} 563	1951									1955	Scrapped		39
Thompsons	30			D^{D} 972	1916	D^{D} 710	1923	D^{D} 535	1929	D^{1} 535	1930			D^{1} 567	1951									1960	Scrapped	May have been relettered D^{1} in late 1928?	44
Thompsons	31			D^{D} 973	1916	D^{D} 553	1925			D^{1} 553	19xx					D^{2} 733	1937	D^{2} 596	1953					1956	Scrapped		40
Thompsons	32			D^{D} 974	1916	D^{D} 712	1923																	1927	Wrecked		11
Thompsons	33			D^{D} 975	1916	D^{D} 713	1928	D^{D} 507	1929	D^{1} 507	1929			D^{1} 562	1951									1953	Scrapped	1928 in lieu of 1929?	37
Thompsons	34			D^{D} 976	1916	D^{D} 714	1924			D^{1} 714	1928	D^{1} 524	1928	D^{1} 565	1951									1959	Scrapped		43
Thompsons	35			D^{D} 977	1916	D^{D} 715	1923									D^{2} 715	19xx	D^{2} 588	1951					1952	Scrapped		36
Thompsons	36			D^{D} 978	1916	D^{D} 716	1924									D^{2} 716	1931			D^{3} 622	1940			1953	Scrapped		37
Thompsons	37			D^{D} 979	1916	D^{D} 717	1923	D^{D} 531	1928	D^{1} 531	1931													1941	Scrapped		25
Thompsons	38			D^{D} 980	1917	D^{D} 718	1923	D^{D} 600	1925	D^{1} 600	19xx			D^{1} 576	1951									1959	Scrapped		42
Thompsons	39			D^{D} 981	1917	D^{D} 555	1925			D^{1} 555	19xx													1943	Scrapped		26
Thompsons	40			D^{D} 982	1917	D^{D} 689	1925			D^{1} 537	19xx					D^{2} 734	1937	D^{2} 597	195x					1955	Scrapped		38
Newport	n/a			D^{D} 1013	1916	D^{D} 721	1923									D^{2} 721	1929			D^{3} 673	1932			1958	Scrapped		42
Newport	n/a			D^{D} 1014	1916	D^{D} 722	1925									D^{2} 722	19xx			D^{3} 674	1932			1962	Scrapped		46
Newport	n/a			D^{D} 1016	1916	D^{D} 724	1925									D^{2} 724	19xx	D^{2} 591	1951					1962	Scrapped		46
Newport	n/a			D^{D} 1015	1916	D^{D} 723	1923									D^{2} 723	19xx			D^{3} 638	1937			1964	Preserved		48
Newport	n/a			D^{D} 1017	1916	D^{D} 725	1923									D^{2} 725	1929			D^{3} 667	1933			1964	Scrapped		48
Newport	n/a			D^{D} 1018	1917	D^{D} 726	1925													D^{3} 675	1930			1963	Scrapped		46
Newport	n/a			D^{D} 1019	1917	D^{D} 727	1925									D^{2} 727	19xx			D^{3} 647	1935			1962	Scrapped		45
Newport	n/a			D^{D} 1020	1917	D^{D} 728	1924													D^{3} 676	1930			1964	Scrapped		47
Newport	n/a			D^{D} 1021	1917	D^{D} 729	1925													D^{3} 677	1930			1965	Preserved	Was displayed at Ringwood, now at Steamrail Ballarat	48
Newport	n/a			D^{D} 1022	1917	D^{D} 730	1926													D^{3} 694	1931			1956	Scrapped		39
Newport	n/a			D^{D} 1023	1917	D^{D} 731	1925									D^{2} 731	19xx			D^{3} 672	1932			1962	Scrapped		45
Newport	n/a			D^{D} 1024	1917	D^{D} 732	1925									D^{2} 732	1931			D^{3} 671	1933			1965	Preserved	On display at Lismore	48
Newport	n/a			D^{D} 1025	1917	D^{D} 733	1924									D^{2} 733	19xx			D^{3} 650	1935			1952	Scrapped		35
Newport	n/a			D^{D} 1026	1917	D^{D} 734	1925													D^{3} 690	1931			1957	Scrapped		40
Newport	n/a			D^{D} 1027	1917	D^{D} 735	1924									D^{2} 735	1929			D^{3} 698	1932			1961	Scrapped		44
Newport	n/a			D^{D} 1028	1917	D^{D} 736	1924									D^{2} 736	1927			D^{3} 670	1932			1960	Scrapped		43
Newport	n/a			D^{D} 1029	1917	D^{D} 737	1925									D^{2} 737	1929			D^{3} 654	1935			1963	Scrapped		46
Newport	n/a			D^{D} 1030	1917	D^{D} 738	1923																	1929	Scrapped		12
Newport	n/a			D^{D} 1031	1918	D^{D} 739	1924									D^{2} 739	19xx			D^{3} 637	1939			1959	Scrapped		41
Newport	n/a			D^{D} 1032	1919	D^{D} 740	1925									D^{2} 740	19xx			D^{3} 649	1935			1952	Scrapped		33
Bendigo	n/a			D^{D} 1033	1920	D^{D} 741	1925									D^{2} 741	1929			D^{3} 696	1932			1957	Scrapped	Intended to be built by Thompsons	37
Bendigo	n/a			D^{D} 1034	1920	D^{D} 742	1922									D^{2} 742	19xx			D^{3} 662	1934			1957	Scrapped	Intended to be built by Thompsons	37
Bendigo	n/a			D^{D} 1035	1920	D^{D} 743	1923									D^{2} 743	1929			D^{3} 695	1932			1953	Scrapped	Intended to be built by Thompsons	33
Bendigo	n/a			D^{D} 1036	1920	D^{D} 744	1925									D^{2} 744	19xx			D^{3} 642	1936			1957	Scrapped	Intended to be built by Thompsons	37
Bendigo	n/a			D^{D} 1037	1920	D^{D} 745	1924													D^{3} 680	1930			1962	Scrapped	Intended to be built by Thompsons	42
Ballarat	n/a			D^{D} 1038	1920	D^{D} 746	1924													D^{3} 678	1930			1960	Scrapped	Intended to be built by Thompsons	40
Ballarat	n/a			D^{D} 1039	1920	D^{D} 747	1925									D^{2} 747	1929			D^{3} 693	1931			1958	Scrapped	Intended to be built by Thompsons	38
Ballarat	n/a			D^{D} 1040	1920	D^{D} 748	1925									D^{2} 748	19xx			D^{3} 645	1936			1962	Scrapped	Intended to be built by Thompsons	42
Ballarat	n/a			D^{D} 1041	1920	D^{D} 749	1923													D^{3} 679	1930			1954	Scrapped	Intended to be built by Thompsons	34
Ballarat	n/a			D^{D} 1042	1920	D^{D} 750	1924									D^{2} 750	19xx			D^{3} 699	1932			1960	Scrapped	Intended to be built by Thompsons	40
Newport	n/a			D^{D} 1043	1920	D^{D} 751	1924									D^{2} 751	1929			D^{3} 639	1937	D^{3} 658	1956	1956	Scrapped	Intended to be built by Thompsons; Never ran as D^{3} 658	36
Newport	n/a			D^{D} 1044	1920	D^{D} 752	1926									D^{2} 752	19xx			D^{3} 692	1931			1960	Scrapped	Intended to be built by Thompsons	40
Newport	n/a			D^{D} 1045	1920	D^{D} 753	1924									D^{2} 753	1929			D^{3} 666	1933			1964	Preserved	Intended to be built by Thompsons; On display at Bayswater	44
Newport	n/a			D^{D} 1046	1920	D^{D} 754	1925									D^{2} 754	19xx			D^{3} 691	1931			1961	Scrapped	Intended to be built by Thompsons	41
Bendigo	n/a			D^{D} 1047	1920	D^{D} 755	1923									D^{2} 755	1931			D^{3} 664	1934			1957	Scrapped	Intended to be built by Thompsons	37
Bendigo	n/a			D^{D} 1048	1920	D^{D} 756	1926									D^{2} 756	1929			D^{3} 665	1933			1960	Scrapped	Intended to be built by Thompsons	40
Bendigo	n/a			D^{D} 1049	1920	D^{D} 757	1923									D^{2} 757	19xx			D^{3} 689	1930			1959	Scrapped	Intended to be built by Thompsons	39
Ballarat	n/a			D^{D} 1050	1920	D^{D} 758	1925									D^{2} 758	1929			D^{3} 656	1935			1961	Scrapped	Intended to be built by Thompsons	41
Ballarat	n/a			D^{D} 1051	1920	D^{D} 759	1923													D^{3} 681	1930			1956	Scrapped	Intended to be built by Thompsons	36
Ballarat	n/a			D^{D} 1052	1920	D^{D} 760	1925																	1929	Scrapped	Intended to be built by Thompsons	9

==== D^{D}_{E} Engines ====
($\mathrm{D^D_E}$ Engines)

Built	Original ID	Renumbered	As	Recoded D4	Off register	Notes	Age
1913	723				1924	Scrapped	16
1908	704	1924	255		1926	Sold to the State Electricity Commission of Victoria	18
1908	702				1929	Scrapped	21
1908	708	1923	273		1929	Scrapped	21
1908	712				1922	Convert to D^{D} 761 (1922) then D^{D} 532 (1925) and scrapped 1934	14
1908	710				1922	Convert to D^{D} 763 (1922) then D^{D} 533 (1925) and scrapped 1935	14
1908	706	1925	287	19xx	1944	Scrapped	36
1909	742				1924	Scrapped	15
1909	744				1926	Scrapped	17
1909	732	1925	281		1928	Scrapped	19
1909	736	1923	272	19xx	1944	Scrapped	35
1909	748	1924	276	1929	1944	Scrapped	35
1909	720	1925	282	19xx	1951	Scrapped	42
1909	714	1923	257	1930	1954	Scrapped	45
1909	716	1923	256	1930	1954	Scrapped	45
1909	718	1923	261	19xx	1954	Scrapped	45
1909	734	1925	265	19xx	1956	Scrapped	47
1909	738	192x	263	19xx	1956	Scrapped	47
1909	746	1929	267	19xx	1960	Scrapped	51
1909	750	1923	274	19xx	1961	Scrapped	52
1909	740	1925	285	1932	1962	Scrapped	53
1910	786				1924	Scrapped	14
1910	792				1924	Scrapped	14
1910	772				1925	Scrapped	15
1910	776				1925	Scrapped	15
1910	788				1925	Scrapped	15
1910	778				1926	Scrapped	16
1910	796				1926	Scrapped	16
1910	782	1928	275		1933	Scrapped	23
1910	794	1923	270		1933	Scrapped	23
1910	774	1924	259	19xx	1935	Scrapped	25
1910	784	1925	286	1931	1951	Scrapped	41
1910	780	1924	277	1931	1954	Scrapped	44
1910	790	1923	268	19xx	1961	Preserved, on display at ARHS Newport Museum	51
1911	709	1923	254		1933	Scrapped	22
1911	711	1926	283	1929	1944	Scrapped	33
1911	705	1925	252	19xx	1954	Scrapped	43
1911	701	1922	250	19xx	1955	Scrapped	44
1911	707	1923	253	1929	1955	Scrapped	44
1911	713	1923	258	19xx	1955	Scrapped	44
1911	715	1924	278	1929	1956	Scrapped	45
1911	703	1922	251	19xx	1957	Scrapped	46
1911	717	1923	260	1931	1960	Scrapped	49
1912	719	1925	284	1931	1955	Scrapped	43
1913	721				1924	Scrapped	11
1913	731				1924	Scrapped	11
1913	739				1924	Scrapped	11
1913	747				1924	Scrapped	11
1913	727				1925	Scrapped	12
1913	745				1926	Scrapped	13
1913	749				1926	Scrapped	13
1913	729	1924	269		1933	Scrapped	20
1913	743	1923	266	1929	1935	Scrapped	22
1913	741	1923	264	1931	1953	Scrapped	40
1913	725	1923	262	19xx	1954	Scrapped	41
1913	737	1924	279	19xx	1954	Scrapped	41
1913	735	1924	280	19xx	1956	Scrapped	43
1913	733	1923	271	19xx	1960	Scrapped	47

=== Demise ===
Scrapping of D^{D} class locomotives commenced as early as 1927 when D^{D} 712 was wrecked, followed by D^{1} 535 in 1928. A full 20 engines (including the newest of the fleet, D^{D} 1052) were scrapped in 1929 as newer K and N class locomotives took over branch line goods services and Petrol Electric Rail Motors started to replace mixed trains and locomotive-hauled branch line passenger services. The unrebuilt saturated steam D^{1} class locomotives were the first to go, and by 1951 no fewer than 120 had been scrapped.

By 1951, the remaining D^{1} locomotives were shunters, the D^{2} locomotives providing suburban goods and branch line goods and passenger service, and the D^{3} performing both branch line and mainline service. However, with the massive postwar upgrading of the VR locomotive fleet as part of 'Operation Phoenix' came the introduction of J class 2-8-0 branch line steam locomotives and T class (EMD G8) diesel electric locomotives to replace the various remaining D^{D} locomotives.

The first D^{3} locomotive to be scrapped was Commissioner's locomotive D^{3} 639 in July 1956, with its brass fittings and number plates being transferred to another locomotive, D^{3} 658, which took over its role as Commissioner's locomotive and its identity as "D^{3} 639".

Withdrawals and scrappings continued throughout the 1950s and 60s. The last D^{D} in VR service was the Commissioner's locomotive D^{3} 639 (formerly D^{3} 658), which was replaced in this role by a Y class (EMD G6B) diesel electric locomotive, Y 123 from January 1964, then Y175 from August 1968. However, D^{3} 639 had since October 1964 taken on a new role providing motive power for the ARHS 'Vintage Train' as the first 'Special Trains Vintage Engine', and continued in this popular role until deteriorated boiler condition saw it finally withdrawn from service in 1974.

== Preservation ==
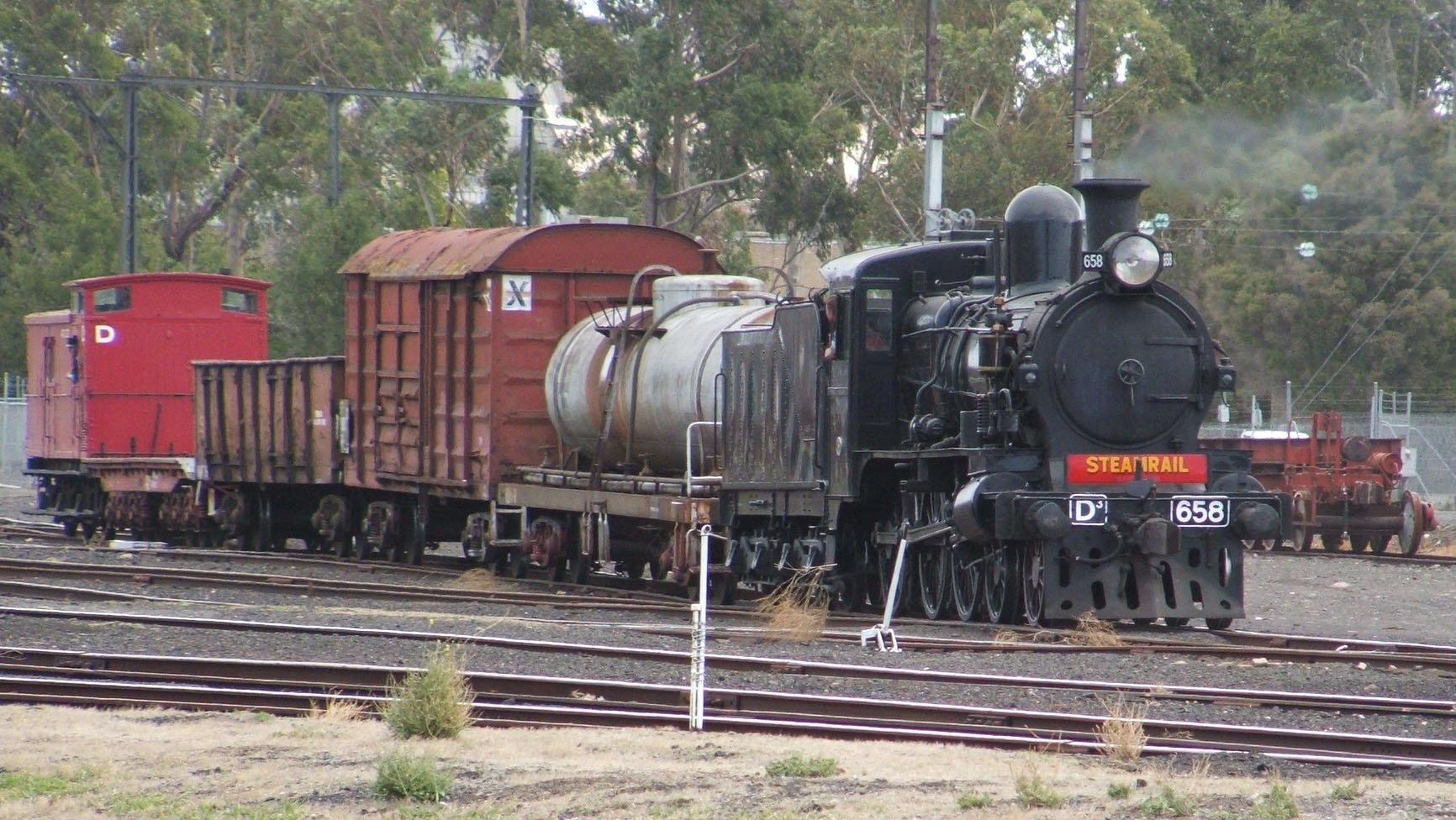
D^{3} 658, hauling a rake of historic goods carriages, Newport Workshops in March 2007

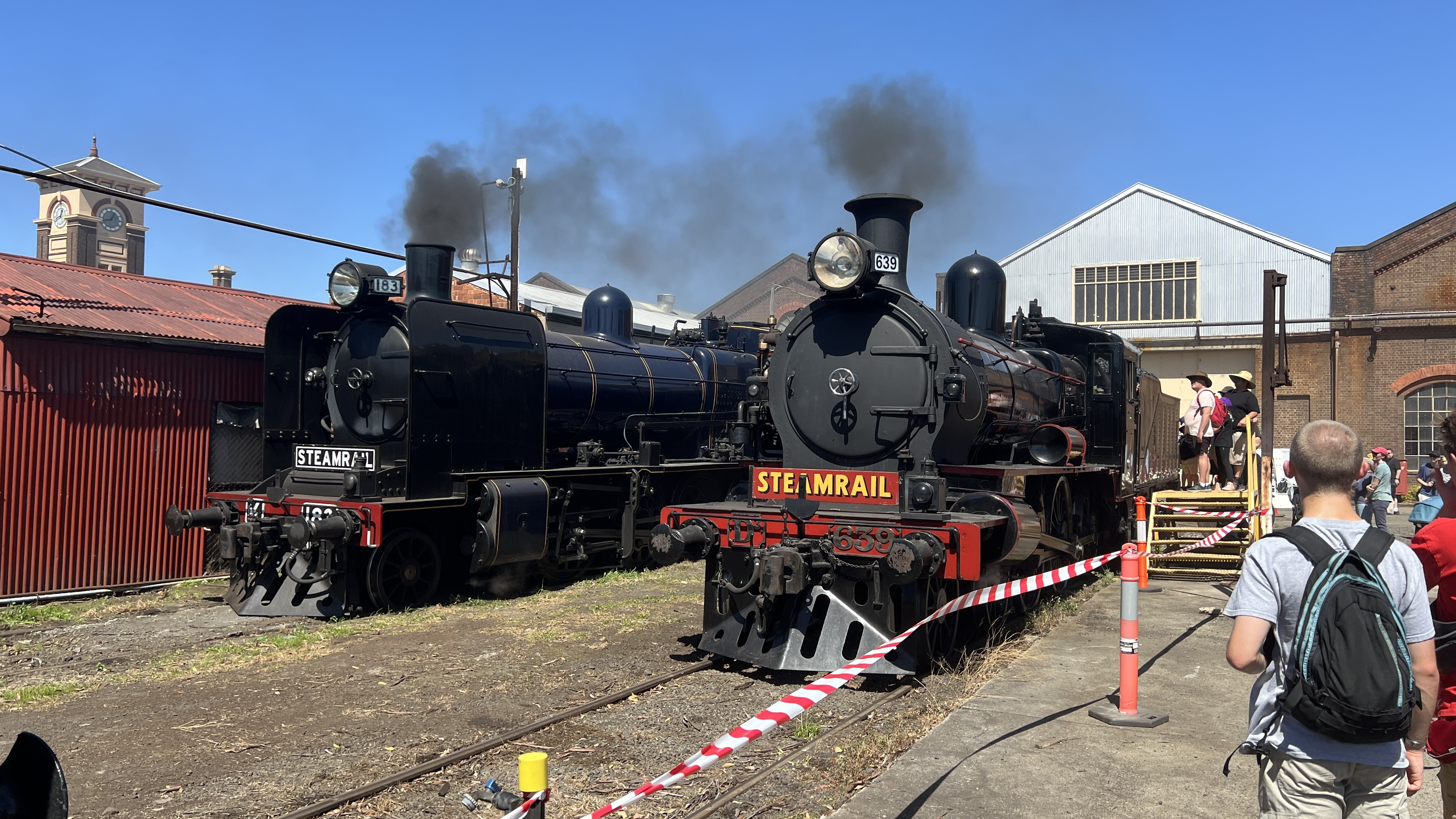
D^{3} 658 (as D^{3} 639) next to K 183 at Steamrail's Open Day at Newport, March 2024

=== Operational ===
D^{3} 639 was restored to operating condition in 1984 and was recommissioned into service by Prime Minister Bob Hawke on 17 November 1984. Since this date, it has continued in service hauling various rail enthusiast special trains. It has also been used in a number of films, and could be seen hauling passenger trains beneath an inoperable overhead catenary in the 2000 remake of the post-apocalyptic film On the Beach.

From 5 December 1970 the engine was painted red with black undergear and a brass dome, and by the Austeam '88 festival it had been named "Spirit of Ballarat". As a rebuild of a 1903 D^{D} locomotive, it made a special long-distance journey to Mildura in 2002 as that line approached its centenary, and celebrated its own 100th anniversary in 2003 with a journey to Swan Hill. Between 2007 and 2009 the engine operated with its previous number of 658.

In 2014 the engine masqueraded as D^{D} 893 for the centenary of the Thompsons Foundry in Castlemaine. While most of its fittings were retained for the day, the number, letter and builders plates were swapped for the occasion. Notably, the first D^{D} built by Thompsons was in fact preserved, having been converted to D^{3} 640 in 1937 then renumbered D^{3} 688 in 1964. It is displayed on a plinth in Swan Hill, and more recently returned to its previous 640 identity.

=== Static ===
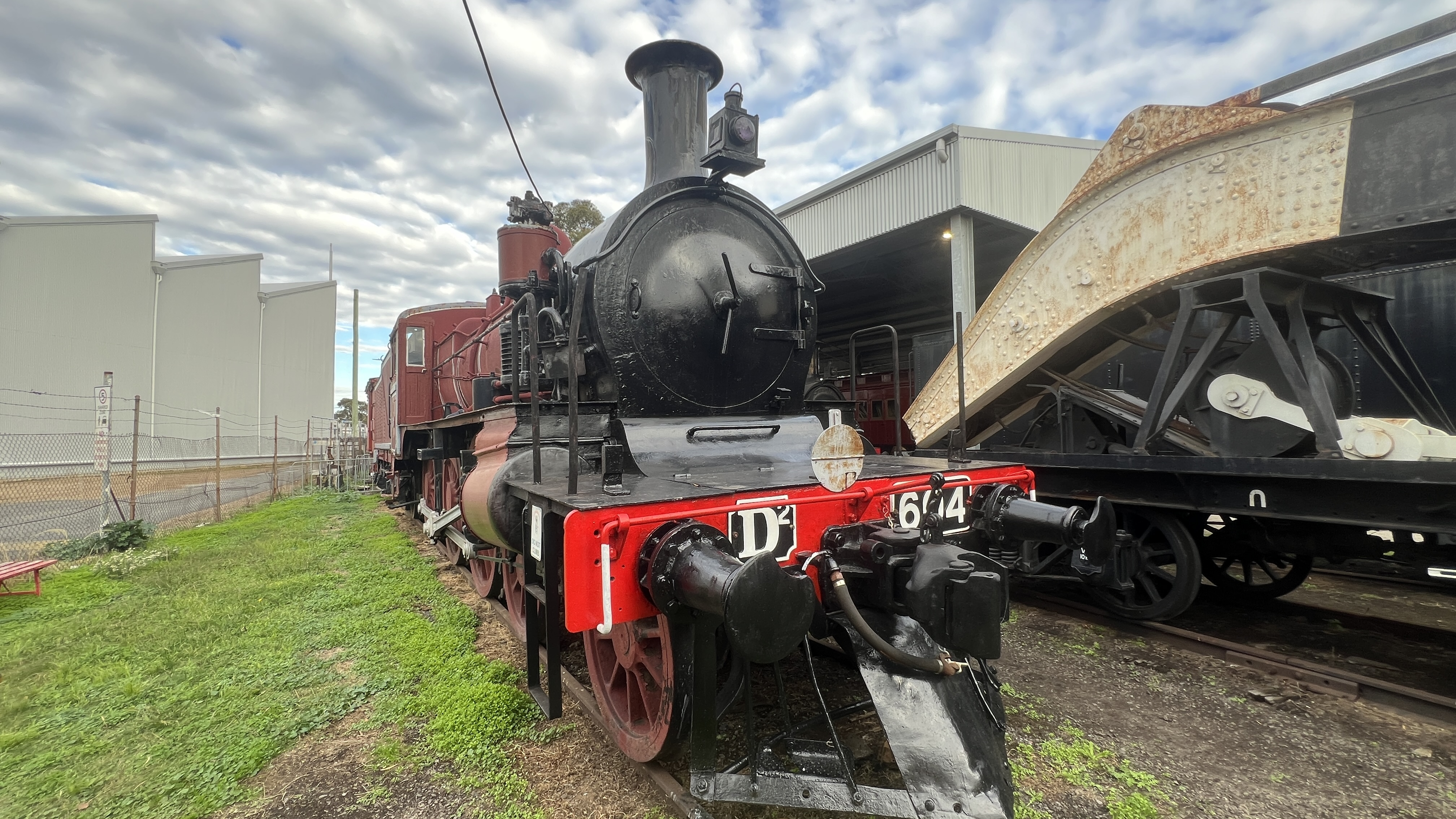
D2 604 as preserved in 2024

A single example of each of the D^{2} (604) and D^{4} (268) locomotives were retained for preservation and today are preserved at the Newport Railway Museum, where they are displayed along with D^{3} 635. Notably, 604 is coupled to a tender consisting of a D^{2} tank on a slightly longer A^{2} frame; this hybrid tender was given to the locomotive during its time at the Australian Paper Mills.

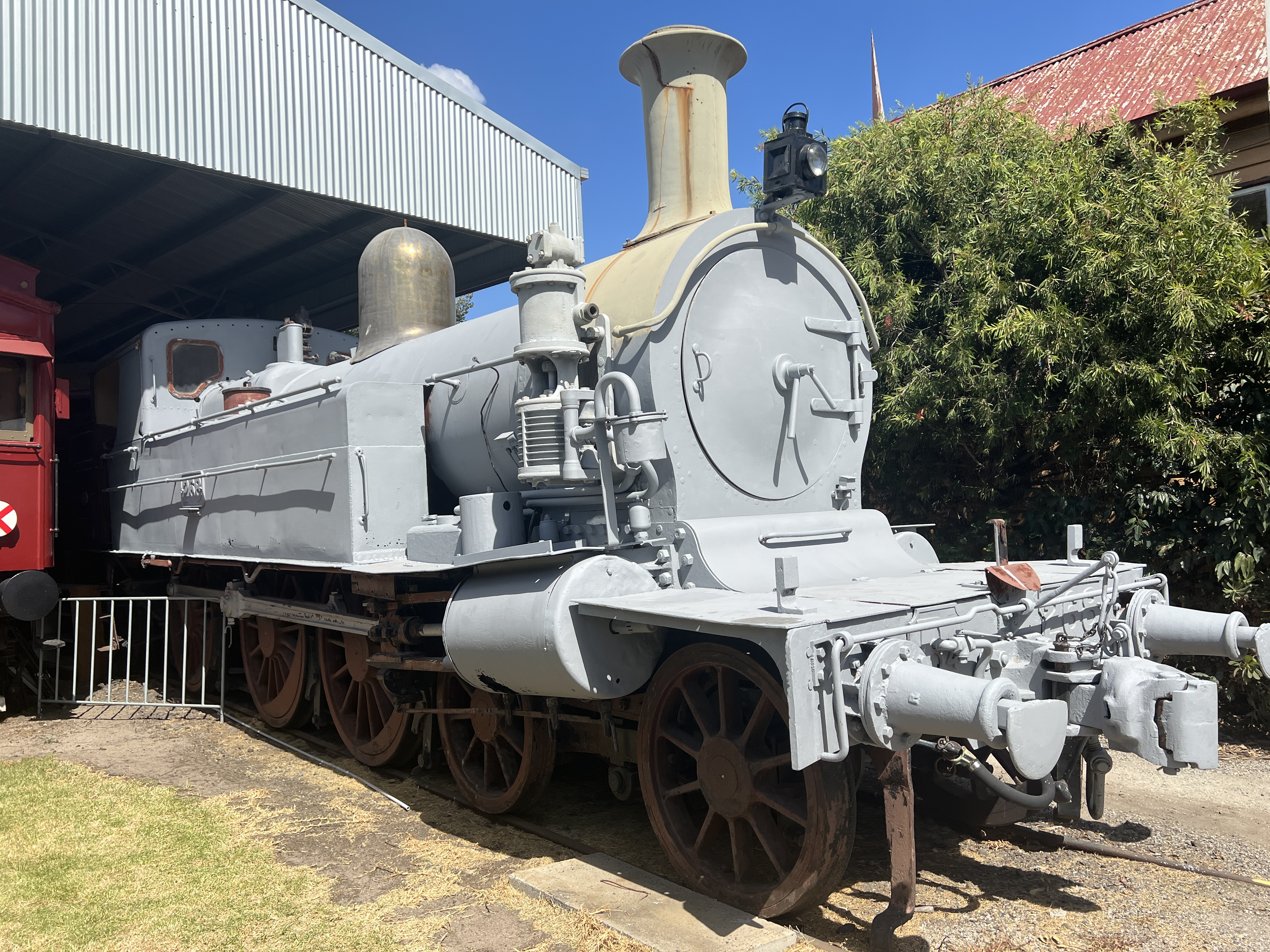
D4 268 undergoing a restoration, 2024

13 other D^{3} class locomotives remain, either preserved in static display or stored awaiting restoration or as a supply of parts, which are listed below.

No original D^{1} class locomotives have survived into preservation.

- D^{3} 640: Located in the area of the Swan Hill Pioneer Settlement. It was the first built locomotive at Thompsons Foundry, Castlemaine. It carried the plates of D3 688 when originally preserved at Swan Hill but has since returned to its original number.
- D^{3} 653: Displayed at the North Ballarat workshops. Painted in Canadian Red Livery.
- D^{3} 666: On Display at the Marie Wallace Bayswater Park in a bright red livery. Covered by a large roof and with steps to climb onto the footplate.
- D^{3} 671: Plinthed at Brown's Waterhole Park in Lismore. Painted in Red with Black Wheels, Chimney, and Steam Dome.
- D^{3} 684: Plinthed in a small park at the up end of Seymour Station. Painted in all over black.

=== Stored ===
- D^{3} 608: Originally plinthed in a Stawell park. Has been stored at the Ballarat East Locomotive Depot as a spare parts source or future restoration.
- D^{3} 619: Located at the VGR Maldon Turntable, where it is held for spare parts or eventual restoration to operation.
- D^{3} 638: Originally plinthed in a Rosebud park. Has been stored at the Ballarat East Locomotive Depot as a spare parts source or future restoration.
- D^{3} 641: Originally plinthed in a Beaufort park. Has been stored at the Ballarat East Locomotive Depot as a spare parts source or future restoration.
- D^{3} 646: Had been plinthed in the courtyard of the Maryborough railway station, now located at the VGR Maldon Turntable, where it is held for spare parts or eventual restoration to operation.
- D^{3} 677: Originally plinthed in a Ringwood park. Has been stored at Newport Workshops as a spare parts source for D^{3} 639.
- D^{3} 688: Originally plinthed in a Rosebud park. Has been stored at the Ballarat East Locomotive Depot as a spare parts source or future restoration.
