= VL class =

Class of Australian diesel locomotives

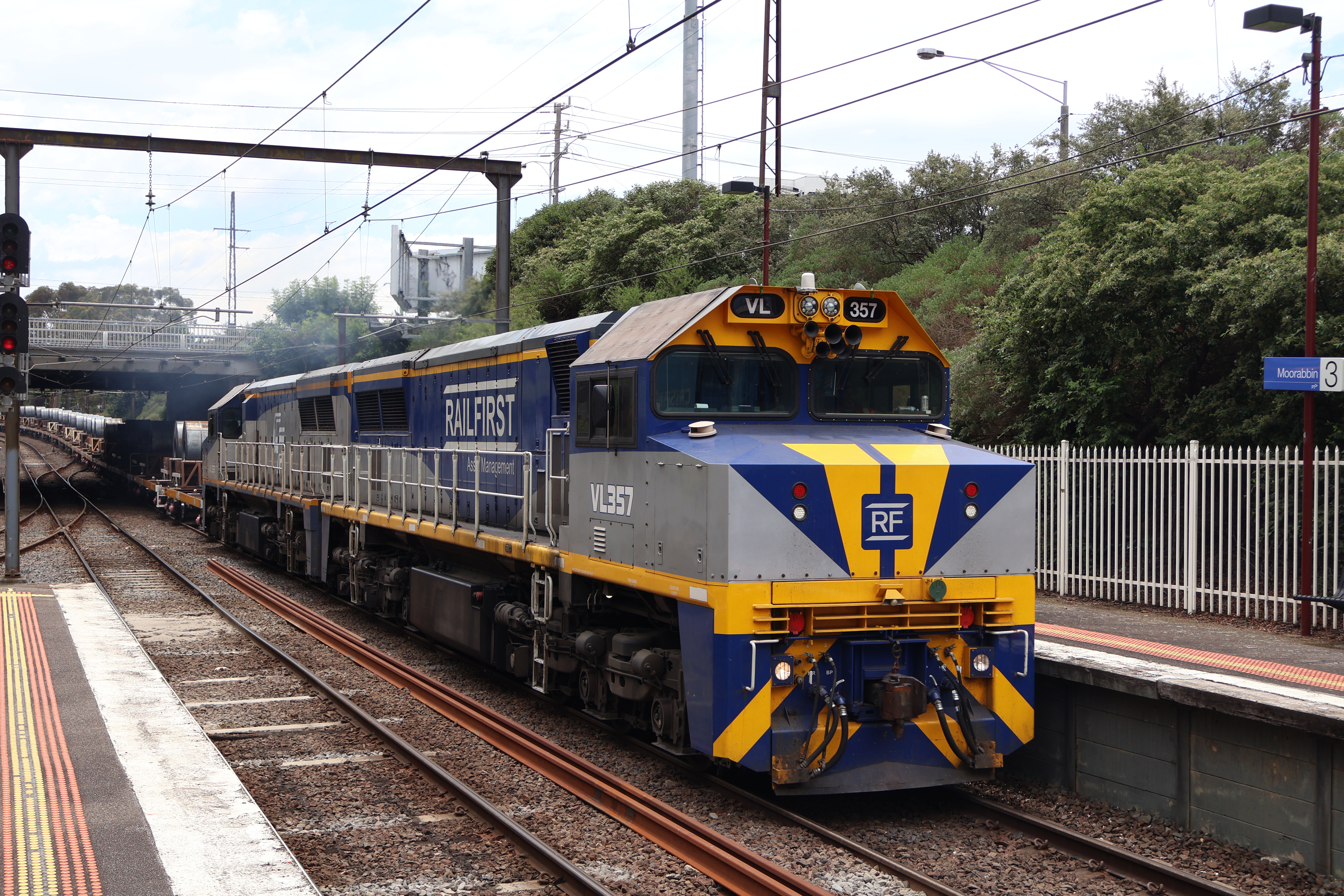
- VL357 at Moorabbin
Type and origin
- Power type: Diesel-electric
- Builder: Avteq
- Model: EMD GT26C
- Build date: 2007 - 2009
- Total produced: 12
Specifications
- Configuration
  - Commonwealth: Co-Co
- Gauge: 1,435 mm (4 ft 8 1/2 in); 1,600 mm (5 ft 3 in)
- Loco weight: 130.0 tonnes
- Fuel capacity: 9,200 litres ((4,200 litres on Broad Gauge))
- Prime mover: EMD 16-645E3B
- Alternator: AR10A4
- Traction motors: D78
- Cylinders: V16
- Train brakes: Air
Performance figures
- Maximum speed: 115 km/h
- Power output: 2,237 kW (3,000 hp)
Career
- Operators: Rail First Asset Management
- Number in class: 12
- Numbers: VL351-VL362
- Delivered: 2007
- First run: 2007
- Last run: 2009
- Current owner: Rail First Asset Management
- Disposition: 12 in service

The VL class is a class of diesel locomotives built by Avteq at a factory in Sunshine, Melbourne for Rail First Asset Management between 2007 and 2009. Built on the EMD GT26 platform, the class was an evolution of the Freight Australia XR class.

They have been hired to a variety of operators and have operated in all mainline states. Most entered service on lease to FreightLink hauling iron ore trains from Pine Creek to Darwin. As at 2010, some remained on hire to FreightLink while others were engaged in hauling grain trains in other states. All are named after Australian racehorses.

As at February 2022, 9 of the 12 were being used by Qube. As at September 2023, 4 are operating on the broad gauge with the Numbers 351, 353, 356 & 357. The other 8 on standard gauge have the Numbers 352, 354, 355, 358, 359, 360, 361 & 362.

Avteq itself was founded in 2002 by Jed Macartney and Rob Powell as an aviation consulting business. In 2005, they diversified into locomotive manufacturing, building the VL class. They designed a second locomotive class, but none were ever manufactured. The company was deregistered in 2013. Southern Shorthaul Railroad would build 2 BRM class locomotives to the design in 2013.

Status Table
Number	Name	Entered Service	Status	Owner	Livery	Operator	Notes
VL351	Danehill	2007	In Service	Rail First Asset Management	RFAM silver & blue	Qube Logistics	Currently on Broad Gauge for use by QUBE in Victoria
VL352	Makybe Diva	2007	Stored, available for hire	Rail First Asset Management	RFAM silver & blue	N/A	Stored at Islington Workshops, South Australia
VL353	Comic Court	2007	In Service	Rail First Asset Management	CFCLA silver & blue	Qube Logistics	Currently on Broad Gauge for use by QUBE in Victoria
VL354	Van Der Hum	2007	Stored, available for hire	Rail First Asset Management	RFAM silver & blue	N/A	Stored at Islington Workshops, South Australia
VL355	Black Knight	2007	Stored, available for hire	Rail First Asset Management	RFAM silver & blue	N/A	Stored at Islington Workshops, South Australia
VL356	Gatum Gatum	2008	Stored, Available for Hire	Rail First Asset Management	RFAM silver & blue	N/A	Stored at Islington Workshops, South Australia
VL357	Empire Rose	2008	In Service	Rail First Asset Management	RFAM silver & blue	Qube Logistics	Currently on Broad Gauge for use by QUBE in Victoria
VL358	Vintage Crop	2008	Stored, Available for Hire	Rail First Asset Management	RFAM silver & blue	N/A	Stored at Islington Workshops, South Australia
VL359	Media Puzzle	2008	Stored, Available for Hire	Rail First Asset Management	RFAM silver & blue	N/A	Stored at Islington Workshops, South Australia
VL360	Gurner’s Lane	2008	Stored, available for hire	Rail First Asset Management	RFAM silver & blue	N/A	Stored at Islington Workshops, South Australia
VL361	At Talaq	2009	Stored, available for hire	Rail First Asset Management	RFAM silver & blue	N/A	Stored at Islington Workshops, South Australia
VL362	Efficient	2009	Stored, available for hire	Rail First Asset Management	RFAM silver & blue	N/A	Stored at Islington Workshops, South Australia
