= Rail First Asset Management =

Australian rolling stock leasing company

- CF class locomotive CF4431 leads a SCT Logistics train to Laverton, Victoria, Australia
- Formerly: Chicago Fright Car Leasing Australia (CFCLA)
- Type: Private
- Industry: Rail Asset Management
- Founded: November 1998
- Headquarters: North Sydney, Australia
- Owner: DIF Capital Partners
- Website: www.railfirst.com.au

Rail First Asset Management (RailFirst), formerly known as CFCL Australia (CFCLA, Chicago Freight Car Leasing), is an Australian rolling stock leasing company operating in the rail freight market. It leases assets to a number of private rail operators, predominantly on the defined interstate rail network.

Though primarily based in New South Wales, RailFirst's assets can be found operating in most Australian states and with all major train operating companies. It has rolling stock on both long-term lease to those companies as well as assets that are available for spot hire. It is owned by DIF Capital Partners and Amber Infrastructure.

Rail First has workshops in Islington Adelaide and Goulburn in regional NSW where it maintains its owned rollingstock in house and the rollingstock of third parties.

== History ==
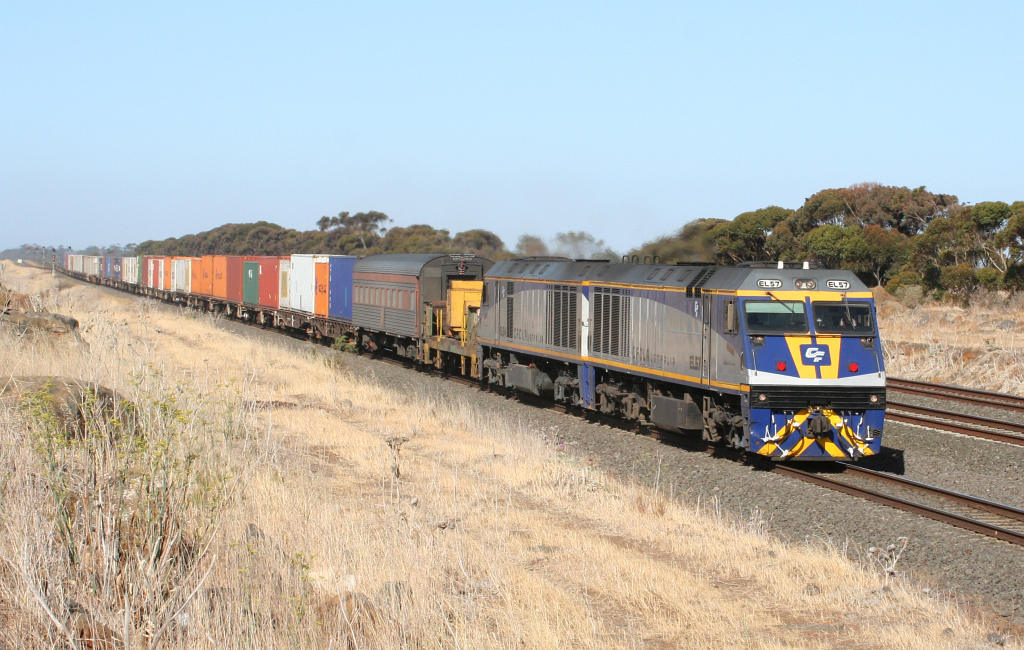
EL class locomotives in January 2007

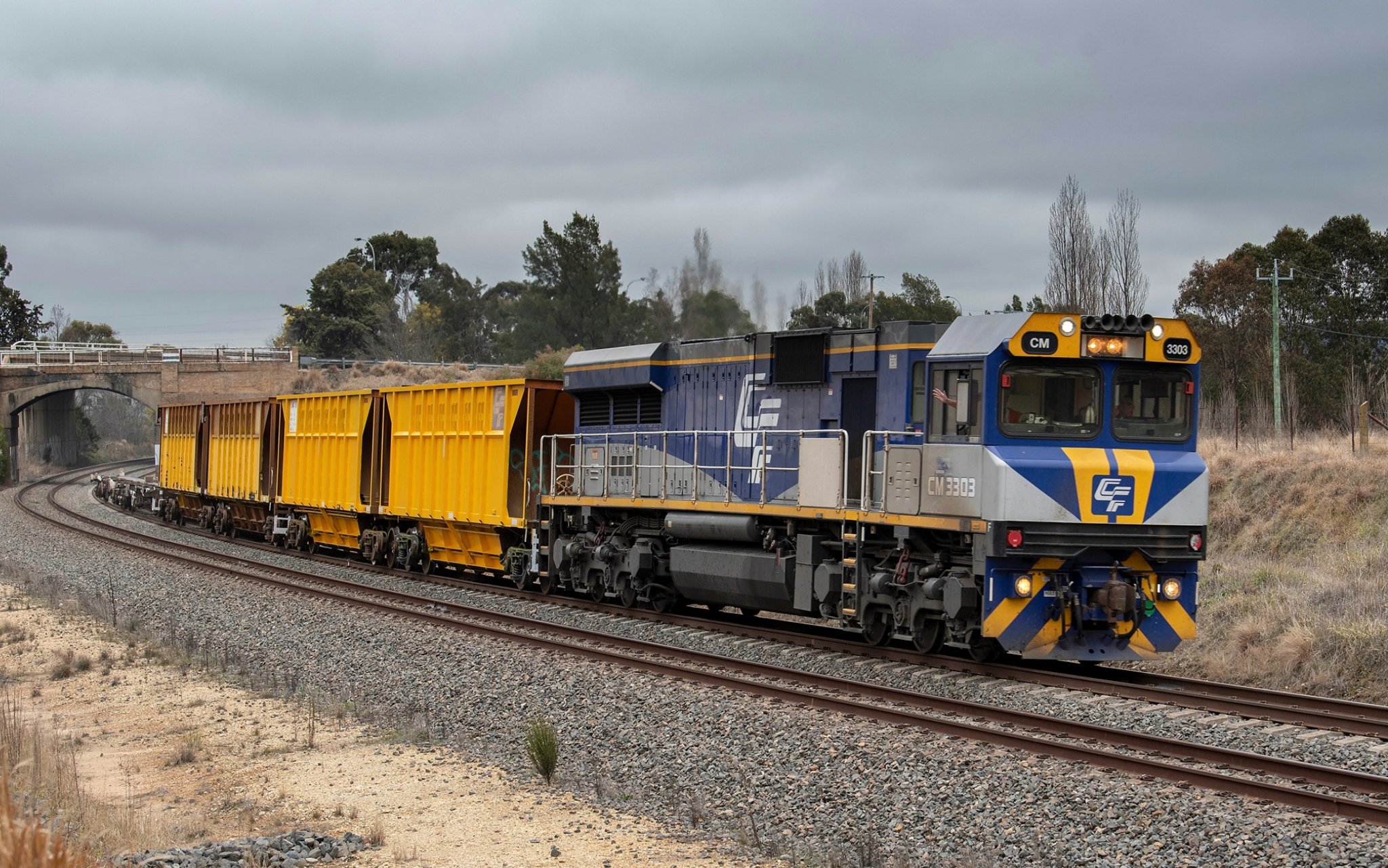
CM3309 hauling hoppers on the main south in NSW

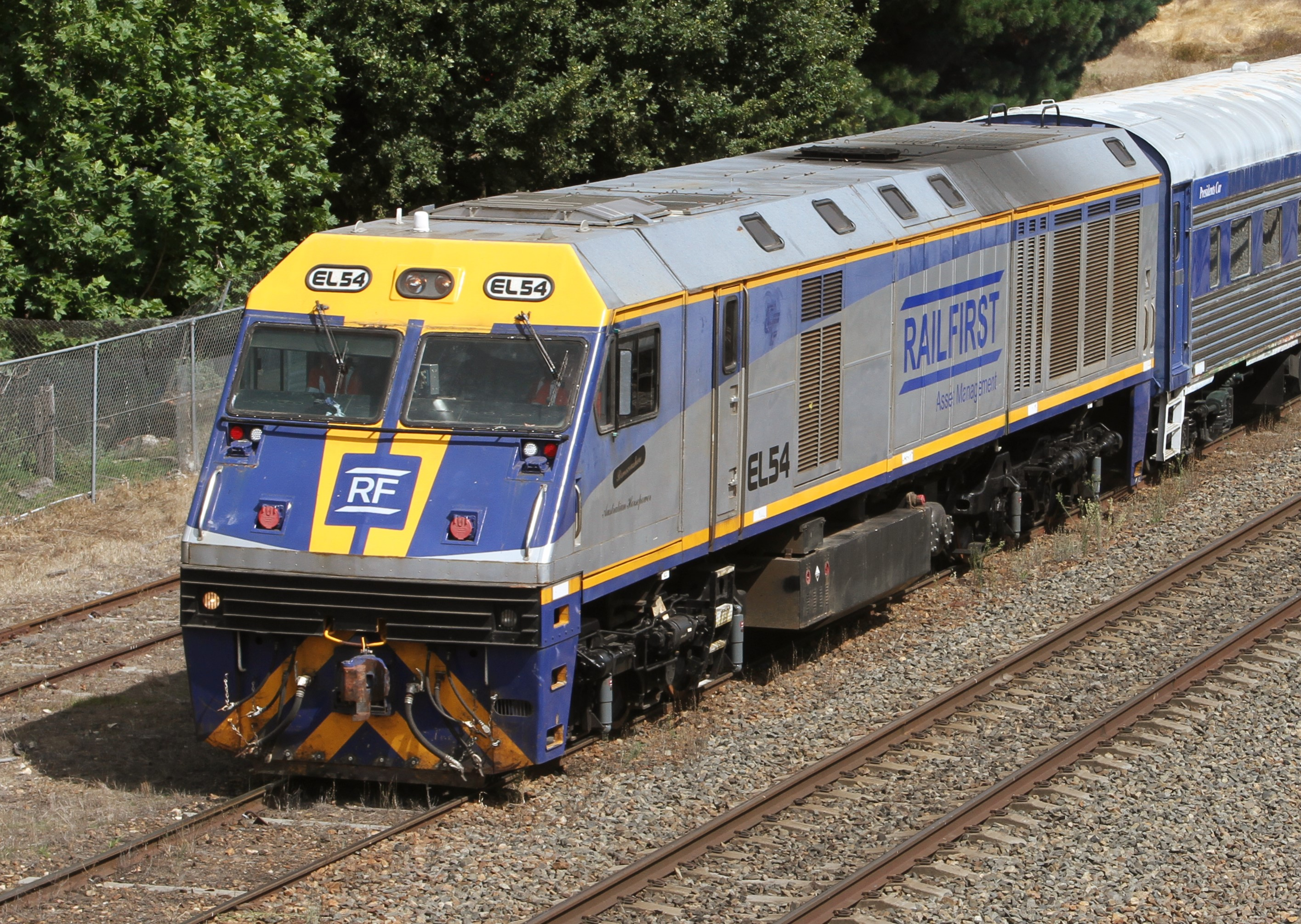
EL54 leads a train north away from Goulburn Workshop.

Rail First Asset Management was originally established in 1998 by the American Chicago Freight Car Leasing Company as CFCL Australia. The company's first contract was for the supply of a small fleet of radio-controlled automated ballast hoppers to Westrail. During November 1998, the company acquired its first locomotives in the form of 13 EL class locomotives, which were obtained from Australian National. In 2000, it expanded the wagon fleet.

In March 2009, the Marubeni Corporation purchased a 49% stake in CFCL Australia. In November 2012, CFCL Australia unveiled its first infrastructure train in the Pilbara region of Western Australia. By October 2014, the company had locomotives operating construction trains on the Roy Hill railway and on the Hamersley & Robe River railway.

Throughout the 2010s, there was a significant growth in demand from the intermodal sector; in response, the majority of CFCL Australia's wagons were engaged in use by various clients in this sector, typically under wet leasing arrangements suitable for companies that may not have traditionally been active on the railways before. To better suit customer demands, the company's management were looking at options to obtain additional 40-foot wagons, one such proposal being the shortening of existing 60-foot wagons. Company officials forecast demand for intermodal rolling stock would continue to grow as additional freight terminals come online across Australia, including several schemes in the Sydney basin and New South Wales, as well as the Inland Rail project.

During 2016, Marubeni decided to relinquish its stake in CFCL Australia and moving to 15% stake in CF Asia Pacific. As of January 2020, Marubeni holds no interest in either entity. During January 2020, CFCL Australia was acquired by Anchorage Capital Partners; one year later, the company was rebranded as Rail First Asset Management (commonly Abbreviated to RFAM) in 2021.

DIF Capital Partners and Amber Infrastructure Group acquired Rail First in December 2022, since this change of ownership new 4400hp AC traction locomotives have been ordered from UGL (GE Wabtec) with 26 to be in service by December 2024. Mid 2024 Amber Infrastructure Group has exited Australia and sold their share to DIF Capital Partners.

== Rail First Asset Management ==
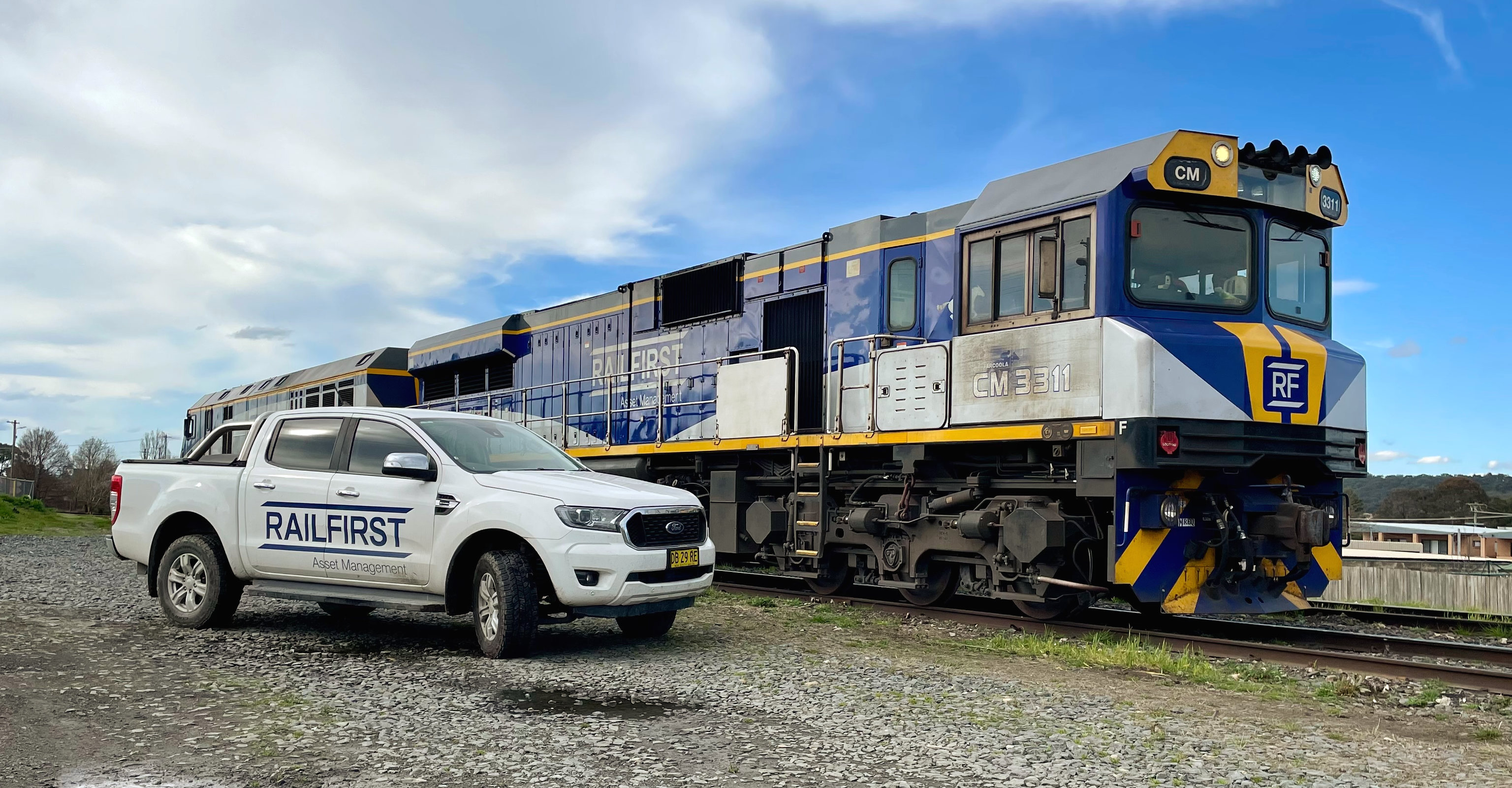
CM3311 "Arcoola" arrives into Goulburn Workshop.

In Jan 2021 Rail First Asset Management took out a lease on the Goulburn Railway Workshops to maintain both its locomotive and wagon fleets with the facility named the Australian Horse Power Service Centre. As well as maintaining its own fleet, Railfirst Asset Management also perform maintenance for other operators including Qube Logistics. It also maintains locomotives at Islington Railway Workshops in Adelaide.

In Early 2021 was established, bringing together the Australian Horse Power Service Centre and took over Bluebird Rail Operations engineering business at Islington. In 2021, Rail First Asset Management was working to expand its workshop capacity to meet customer demand, particularly for fast turnaround times.

== Fleet ==
Initially, RailFirst's locomotive fleet comprised second-hand locomotives that were no longer required by their original rail operators: some of these would be re-manufactured units or had undergone life-extending overhauls. Over time, the company has orientated towards purchasing new locomotives instead. In May 2012, the company placed one of its first orders for ten MP33C new-build locomotives with Wabtec subsidiary MotivePower.

The RailFirst diesel locomotive fleet is made up of a variety of different classes of units, ranging from modern high power units to older mainline locomotives. By February 2020, the company had opted to permanently withdraw all of its older smaller locomotive. By March 2020, the company's inventory contained 78 locomotives:

Class	Image	Type	Gauge	Top speed (km/h)	Built	Number	Notes
CF class		Diesel-electric	Standard	115	2012 – Present	37	New build, 8 more under construction
CM class		Diesel-electric	Standard	115	2013 – 2015	16	New build
EL class		Diesel-electric	Standard	115	1990 – 1991	12	Ex Australian National Stored, for sale
G class		Diesel-electric	Broad	115	1984 – 1989	2	Ex SCT Logistics Originally owned by V/Line
GL class		Diesel-electric	Standard	115	2003 – 2004	12	Rebuilt ex FreightCorp 442 class
VL class		Diesel-electric	Standard	115	2007 – 2009	12	New build

Most locomotives in the fleet are named after famous Australian racehorses.

RailFirst fleet consist of 1,200 freight wagons of a variety of types including grain hoppers, bulk mineral hoppers, and intermodal flat wagons of varying lengths and carrying capabilities. RailFirst wagons generally have four-character identification codes starting with the letter C.
