= List of Victorian locomotive classes =

Locomotives of Victoria, Australia

This is a list of Victorian locomotive classes, being classes of locomotive that have worked on railways in Victoria.

The majority of Victorian steam locomotive classes were operated by the Victorian Railways (VR). Regularly scheduled steam working ceased on VR mainline operations after 25 May 1972 - with only special excursion or enthusiasts trains being hauled by steam after that time.

Other significant operators include the State Transport Authority (STA), the Metropolitan Transit Authority (MTA), the Public Transport Corporation (PTC), V/Line, Freight Victoria/Freight Australia (FA), and Pacific National (PN). Many private organisations also operated steam locomotives in Victoria.

== Locomotives (Early private companies) ==
Image	Class	Wheel arrangement	Fleet number(s)	Manufacturer	Years in service	Number made	Number remaining	Comments
=== Melbourne and Hobson's Bay Railway Company (M&HBR) ===
	Ballast wagon powered by pile driver components	0-4-0	Pile driver engine	Robertson, Martin & Smith	1854	1	0	Built for the construction of the first railway as ordered locos had not arrived yet
	M&HBR 2-2-2WT	2-2-2WT	2-2-2	Langlands foundry & Robertson, Martin & Smith	1854–1857	1	0	Built for the opening of the first railway as ordered locos had not arrived yet; Sold for railway construction
	M&HBR 2-4-0WT	2-4-0WT	Melbourne, Meteor, Rapid, Sandridge, St Kilda, Victoria, Yarra, 1268, 1269 and 1458	Robert Stephenson & Co. 954–957, 1080, 1183, 1184, 1268, 1269, 1458	1854–1865	10	0	7 to M&HUBR; 1 to M&SR; 2 to SK&BR
	M&HBR 0-4-0WT	0-4-0WT	Pier Donkey	Robert Stephenson & Co. 1177	1858–1865	1	0	To M&HUBR
=== Geelong and Melbourne Railway Company (G&MR) ===
	G&MR 0-4-0T	0-4-0VBT	Ariel	Walker & Munro, Geelong	1855–1860	1	0	To Victorian Railways
	G&MR 2-2-2WT	2-2-2WT	Oberon, Sirocco, Titania, Typhoon	Robert Stephenson & Co. (2); 1006, 1007; Stothert & Slaughter, Bristol (2)	1856–1860	4	0	All to Victorian Railways
	G&MR 2-4-0WT	2-4-0WT	Cyclone, Hurricane	R&W Hawthorn; 925, 926	1857–1860	2	0	All to Victorian Railways
	G&MR 0-6-0WT	0-6-0WT	Goliath, Hercules, Samson, Tubal-Cain	R&W Hawthorn; 927–930	1857–1860	4	0	2 to Victorian Railways; 1 to M&SR; 1 sold for railway construction
=== St Kilda and Brighton Railway Company (SK&BRC) ===
	M&HBR 2-4-0WT	2-4-0WT	Melbourne, Yarra	Robert Stephenson & Co. 954, 957	1862–1865*	2	0	All ex-M&HBR; *From 1862 used by MRC, but still owned by SK&BRC; All to M&HUBR
=== Melbourne and Suburban Railway Company (M&SRC) ===
	M&HBR/M&SR 2-4-0WT	2-4-0WT	Kew, Victoria, 1378*	Robert Stephenson & Co. 956, 1377, 1378	1858–1862	3*	0	Ex-M&HBR; 2 to MRC; *#1378 could not be paid for and sold for railway construction
	G&MR 0-6-0WT	0-6-0WT	Hercules	R&W Hawthorn; 928	1858–1862	1	0	Ex-G&MRC; To MRC
	M&SR 2-4-0T	2-4-0T	Hawthorn, Richmond	George England & Co. 160, 161	1862	2	0	All to MRC
=== Melbourne Railway Company (MRC) ===
	M&HBR/M&SR/MRC 2-4-0WT	2-4-0WT	Melbourne*, Kew, Prahran, Victoria, Windsor, Yarra*	Robert Stephenson & Co. 954, 956, 957, 1377, 1459, 1460	1862–1865	6*	0	3 ex-M&SR; 1 ex-M&HBR; All to M&HUBR; *Melbourne & Yarra owned by SK&BR but used by MRC
	G&MR 0-6-0WT	0-6-0WT	Hercules	R&W Hawthorn; 928	1862–1865	1	0	Ex-M&SR; To M&HUBR
	M&SR 2-4-0T	2-4-0T	Hawthorn, Richmond	George England & Co. 160, 161	1862–1865	2	0	All ex-M&SR; All to M&HUBR
=== Melbourne and Essendon Railway Company (M&ER) ===
	M&ER 2-4-0T	2-4-0T	Essendon, #459*	Slaughter, Gruning & Co. 458, 459*	1862–1864	2*	0	To SAR to become E 13; *#459 not used and sold to SAR to become E 10
=== Melbourne and Hobson's Bay United Railway Company (M&HBUR) ===
	M&HBR/M&SR/MRC 2-4-0WT	2-4-0WT	1 – 4, 6 – 16, 19, Melbourne, Kew, Meteor, Prahran, Rapid, Sandridge, St Kilda, Toorak, Victoria (x2), Windsor, Yarra	Robert Stephenson & Co. 954–957, 1080, 1183, 1184, 1268, 1269, 1377, 1458–1460, 1620, 1802, 1803, 1991	1865–1878	17	0	2 ex SK&BR; 4 ex MRC; 7 ex M&HBR; 1 sold for wool pressing; 5 sold for railway construction; 11 to Victorian Railways South Suburban system (later N class)
	G&MR 0-6-0WT	0-6-0WT	Hercules	R&W Hawthorn; 928	1865–1869	1	0	Ex-MRC; Sold for railway construction
	M&HBR 0-4-0WT	0-4-0WT	5, 24, Pier Donkey (x2)	Robert Stephenson & Co. 1177, 2220	1865–1878	2	0	1 ex M&HBR; All to Victorian Railways
	M&SR 2-4-0T	2-4-0T	17 – 18, Hawthorn, Richmond	George England & Co. 160, 161	1865–1877	2	0	All ex-MRC; 2 sold for railway construction
	M&HBUR 4-4-0WT	4-4-0WT	20 – 23, 25 – 26	Robert Stephenson & Co. 1995, 2123, 2130, 2214, 2328, 2329	1871–1878	6	0	All to Victorian Railways as C class

== Locomotives (Victorian Railways and successors) ==
Image	Class	Wheel arrangement	Fleet number(s)	Manufacturer	Years in service	Number made	Number remaining	Comments
=== Tank locomotives ===
	C class	4-4-0WT	VR South Suburban system 1 – 4, 17, 18, 20 – 23, 25 – 38 VR; C 42, C 262 – C 310 (even only)	Robert Stephenson & Co. (6); Phoenix Foundry (12); Robertson Bros. (8)	1878–1918	26	0	VR South Suburban system: 6 ex-Melbourne and Hobson's Bay Railway Company; 20 new; 26 to Victorian Railways as C class; VR: All scrapped
Victorian Railways photograph of DDE 702, circa 1910	$\mathrm{D^D_E}$ class	4-6-2T	$\mathrm{D^D_E}$ 701 – $\mathrm{D^D_E}$ 721, $\mathrm{D^D_E}$ 723 – $\mathrm{D^D_E}$ 729 (odd only), $\mathrm{D^D_E}$ 731 – $\mathrm{D^D_E}$ 750, $\mathrm{D^D_E}$ 772 – $\mathrm{D^D_E}$ 796(even only) $\mathrm{D^D_E}$ 250 – $\mathrm{D^D_E}$ 287 §	VR Newport Workshops	1908–1932	58	0	2 converted to D^{D} class; 38 converted to D^{4} class; 18 scrapped
D4 268 at the Victoria Railway Museum	D^{4} class	4-6-2T	D^{4} 250 – D^{4} 287	VR Newport Workshops	1929–1962	38	1	1 at Newport Railway Museum; 38 scrapped
E236 at the Victoria Railway Museum	E class	2-4-2T	E 12, E 34, E 36, E 346 – E 394 (even only), E 426 – E 460 (even only), E 472 – E 520 (even only), later Unclassed 236 (ex E 506)	David Munro (25); Kitson & Co (1); Phoenix Foundry (45)	1889–1954	71	1	24 converted to E^{E} class; 20 converted to South Australian Railways M class; 1 at Newport Railway Museum
'EE' (later reclassified 'E') shunter 0-6-2T No. E369, at the Victoria Railway Museum	E^{E} class	0-6-2T	E^{E} 34, E^{E} 348 – E^{E} 518 (various), E^{E}350 – E^{E}390 (various) §, E 350 – E 353, E 355 – E 357, E 359, E 361 – E 367, E 369 – E 381, E 390	Phoenix Foundry (5); VR Newport Workshops (24)	1893–1966	29	2	1 at Newport Railway Museum; 1 at Victorian Goldfields Railway
F176 at the Victoria Railway Museum	F class (Motor)	2-4-2T	F 172 – F 184 (evens only)	VR Newport Workshops	1910–1929	7	1	1 at Newport Railway Museum
	G&MR 0-4-0T	0-4-0VBT	Ariel	Walker & Munro, Geelong	1860–1864	1	0	Ex-G&MRC; Sold as pumping engine
	G&MR 0-6-0WT	0-6-0WT	19, 21, Goliath, Samson	R&W Hawthorn; 927–930	1860–?	2	0	All ex-G&MRC; 1 sold to private company tramway; 1 used as stationary engine
	G&MR 2-2-2WT	2-2-2WT	34 – 40 (even only), Oberon, Sirocco, Titania, Typhoon	Robert Stephenson & Co. (2); 1006, 1007; Stothert & Slaughter, Bristol (2)	1860–?	4	0	All ex-G&MRC; 1 sold to private company tramway; 1 sold for railway construction; 2 used as stationary engine
	G&MR 2-4-0WT	2-4-0WT	42, 44, Cyclone, Hurricane	R&W Hawthorn; 925, 926	1860–?	2	0	All ex-G&MRC; All used as stationary engine
	L class	2-4-0ST	16 – 25 †; L 14 – L 32 (even only)	George England & Co. (7); Slaughter, Gruning & Co. (3)	1861–1906	10	0	All scrapped
	M class	4-4-0T	40 ‡, 210 – 238 (even only) ‡, M 40, M 210 – M 240 (even only), M 312 – M 320 (even only)	Beyer, Peacock & Co. (1); Phoenix Foundry (21)	1879–1905	22	0	All converted to M^{E} class
No 40 departing North Melbourne station for Sunshine.	M^{E} class	4-4-2T	M 40, M 210 – M 240 (even only), M 312 – M 320 (even only)	VR Newport Workshops	1900–1922	22	0	All kept original 'M' class plates; All scrapped
	M&HBR 0-4-0WT	0-4-0WT	VR South Suburban system 5, 24, Pier Donkey (x2) VR; Pier Donkey (x2)	Robert Stephenson & Co. 1177, 2220	1878–c1904	2	0	VR South Suburban system: All ex M&HBUR; All to Victorian Railways (unclassed); VR: 1 sold for railway construction; 1 scrapped
	N class	2-4-0WT	VR South Suburban system 1, 6 – 16, 19 VR; N 242 – N 260 (even only)	Robert Stephenson & Co.	1878–1906	11	0	VR South Suburban system: All ex-Melbourne and Hobson's Bay Railway Company; 1 disposal unknown; 10 to Victorian Railways as N class; VR: 1 sold to Langlands & Co.; 4 sold for railway construction; 5 scrapped
NA locomotive 12A at Belgrave on the Puffing Billy Railway 2005	NA class	2-6-2T	1 A – 17 A	Baldwin Locomotive Works (2); VR Newport Workshops (15)	1898–1973	17	6	6 at the Puffing Billy Railway
	Z class	2-4-0T	Z 522, Z 524	Phoenix Foundry	1893–1911	2	0	All scrapped
Z-Class Locomotive Z 526 on display at Newport Railway Workshops during a Steamrail Victoria open day, 14/03/2016	Z class	0-6-0T	Z 526	VR Newport Workshops	1893–1978	1	1	At Scienceworks Museum
=== Tender locomotives ===
One of the nine old engines sold was the original No. 1 of the Victorian Railways purchased in 1858. 54 years later it was named ‘Willunga’ and used in making the Brighton line in South Australia.	No. 1	2-2-2; 2-4-0	1 †, 12, 528	George England & Co.	1859–1890, 1893–1904	1	0	Sold 1890, bought back 1893; Scrapped
No. 100 PERSPECTIVE VIEW	No. 100 (E class)	2-4-0	100 †‡, E 100, 100	VR Williamstown Workshops	1872–1916	1	0	Scrapped
Victorian railways number 103 or 5 with the side rods removed	No. 103 & 105	0-6-0	103, 105	VR Williamstown Workshops	1873–1924	2	0	All scrapped-
	Old A class	4-4-0	190 – 208 (even only) ‡, A 190 – A 208 (even only)	Beyer, Peacock & Co.	1884–1924	10	0	All scrapped
	New A class	4-4-0	A 396 – A 424 (even only)	Phoenix Foundry	1889–1925	15	0	All scrapped
Victorian Railways AA class steam locomotive	A^{A} class	4-4-0	A^{A}530 – A^{A}558 (even only), A^{A}562 – A^{A}570 (even only), A^{A}74 – A^{A}77 §, A^{A}82 – A^{A}86 (even only) §	Phoenix Foundry	1900–1932	20	0	All scrapped
A2 986 on the turntable at the former North Melbourne locomotive depot, circa 1916	A^{2} class	4-6-0	A^{2} 572 – A^{2} 1082 (various), A^{1} 800 – A^{1} 877 (various), A^{2} 816 – A^{2} 999 §	VR Ballarat North Workshops (5); VR Bendigo Workshops (5); VR Newport Workshops (175)	1907–1964	185	5	Saturated steam boilers were classed A^{1} until converted to superheater; 2 at Newport Railway Museum; 1 at Steamrail; 1 in Echuca; 1 in Reservoir
B class with original spark-arresting funnel	B class	2-4-0	32 – 51 †, 64 – 69 †, 82 – 87 †, 46 – 96 (even only) ‡, 102 – 112 (even only) ‡, 186 ‡, 188 ‡, B 46 – B 80 (even only), B 84 – B 90 (even only), B 94, B 96, B 102 – B 112 (even only), B 186, B 188	Beyer, Peacock & Co. (19); Phoenix Foundry (2); R&W Hawthorn (13)	1862–1917	34	0	All scrapped
VR photograph of C 1, as built in 1918	C class	2-8-0	C 1 – C 26	VR Newport Workshops	1918–1962	26	1	1 at Newport Railway Museum; 25 scrapped
Rogers D Class	'Rogers' (D class)	4-4-0	162, 164	Rogers Locomotive Works	1877–1907	2	0	All scrapped
	D class	4-4-0	D 82, D 92, D 122, D 242, D 244, D 248, D 250, D 260, D 322 – D 344 (even only), D 190 §, D 191 §, D 194 §	Phoenix Foundry	1887–1928	20	0	All scrapped
VR photo of DD 590 as built, 1902	D^{D} class	4-6-0	D^{D}873 – D^{D} 912, D^{D} 943 – D^{D} 982, D^{D} 1013 – D^{D} 1052, D^{D} 500 – D^{D} 799 §	Baldwin Locomotive Works (20); Beyer, Peacock & Co. (20); Phoenix Foundry (7); Thompson Foundry (40); VR Ballarat North Workshops (8); VR Bendigo Workshops (8); VR Newport Workshops (138); Walkers Limited (20) ? (2)	1902–c. 1939	263	0	141 converted to D^{1}; 82 converted to D^{2}; 11 converted to D^{3}; 29 scrapped
	D^{1} class	4-6-0	D^{1} 500 – D^{1} 703 (various)	Ex-D^{D} class	c. 1924–1960	141	0	25 converted to D^{2}; 10 converted to D^{3}; 105 scrapped
D2 604 at the Victoria Railway Museum	D^{2} class	4-6-0	D^{2} 580 – D^{2} 604, D^{2} 615, D^{2} 700 – D^{2} 799	Ex-D^{D} class	c. 1927–1962	107	1	73 converted to D^{3}; 1 at Newport Railway Museum; 33 scrapped
D3 635 at the Victoria Railway Museum	D^{3} class	4-6-0	D^{3} 604, D^{3} 606 – D^{3} 699	VR Newport Workshops	1929–1974	94	14	1 at Newport Railway Museum; 6 at Steamrail; 2 at Victorian Goldfields Railway; 1 in Ballarat North; 1 in Bayswater; 1 in Lismore; 1 in Seymour; 1 in Swan Hill; 80 scrapped
An F Class locomotive circa 1875 in the Central Highlands region	F class	2-4-0	98‡ 126 – 144 (even only)‡, 166 – 184 (even only) ‡, F 98, F 126 – F 144 (even only), F 166 – F 184 (even only)	Beyer, Peacock & Co. (1); Phoenix Foundry (20)	1874–1922	21	0	7 converted to F class (motors); 14 scrapped
	G class	4-4-0	38 ‡, 44 ‡, G 38, G 44	VR Williamstown Workshops	1877–1904	2	0	All scrapped
	H class	4-4-0	146 – 160 (even only) ‡, H 146 – H 160 (even only)	Phoenix Foundry	1877–1916	8	0	All scrapped
Builder's photograph of H220, 1941	H class	4-8-4	H 220	VR Newport Workshops	1941–1956	1	1	1 at Newport Railway Museum
	J class	2-2-2; 2-4-0	2 – 6 †, 2 – 10 (even only) ‡, J 2 – J 10 (even only)	Beyer, Peacock & Co.	1860–1916	5	0	All scrapped
J 515 awaits departure from Maldon	J class	2-8-0	J 500 – J 559	Vulcan Foundry	1954–1978	60	11	1 at 707 Operations; 1 at Newport Railway Museum; 2 at Seymour Railway Heritage Centre; 1 at Victorian Goldfields Railway; 2 at Yarra Valley Railway; 1 in Dimboola; 1 in Donald; 1 in Mulwala; 1 in Noojee; 49 scrapped
	K class	2-4-0	114 – 124 (even only) ‡, K 114 – K 124 (even only)	Phoenix Foundry	1874–1905	6	0	All scrapped
K190 at Maldon	K class	2-8-0	K 100 – K 109, K 140 – K 192 §	VR Newport Workshops	1922–1979	53	21	1 at Locomotive Restoration Group; 4 at Mornington Railway; 1 at Newport Railway Museum; 1 at Seymour Railway Heritage Centre; 5 at Steamrail; 2 at Victorian Goldfields Railway; 1 in Hamilton; 1 in Korumburra; 1 in Mildura; 1 in Numurkah; 1 in Wonthaggi; 1 in Wycheproof; 1 in Yarragon; 32 scrapped
N432 at the Victoria Railway Museum	N class	2-8-2	N 110 – N 139, N 400 – N 432 §, N 450 – N 499 §	North British Locomotive Company (50); VR Newport Workshops (33)	1925–1966	83	1	10 converted to South Australian Railways 750 class; 1 at Newport Railway Museum; 72 scrapped
O class locomotive	O class	0-6-0	26 – 31 †, 52 – 63 †, 70 – 81 †, 88 †, 89 †, 19 – 81 (odd only) ‡, 127 – 149 (odd only) ‡, O 19 – O 81 (odd only), O 127 – O 149 (odd only)	Beyer, Peacock & Co. (11); Phoenix Foundry (7); Robert Stephenson & Co. (12); Slaughter, Gruning & Co. (6); VR Williamstown Workshops (2); Yorkshire Engine Co. (6)	1862–1922	44	0	All scrapped
.	P class	0-6-0	5 – 9 †, 1 – 9 (odd only) ‡, P 1 – P 9 (odd only)	Beyer, Peacock & Co.	1860–1921	5	0	All scrapped
Q class locomotive	Q class	0-6-0	83 – 101 (odd only) ‡, Q 83 – Q 101 (odd only)	Phoenix Foundry	1873–1908	10	0	All scrapped
	'Belgian' R class	0-6-0	237 – 245 (odd only) ‡, R 237 – R 245 (odd only)	Société de Saint-Léonard	1883–1920	5	0	All scrapped
	Old R class	0-6-0	151 ‡, 157 – 195 (odd only) ‡, 247 ‡, 285 – 325 (odd only) ‡, R 11, R 13, R 151, R 157 – R 195 (odd only), R 247, R 285 – R 351 (odd only), R 300 – R 347 (various) §, R 349 §	Beyer, Peacock & Co. (4); Phoenix Foundry (55)	1879–1944	59	0	All scrapped
	New R class	0-6-0	R 447 – R 495(odd only)	Robertson Bros.	1889–1908	25	0	All converted to R^{Y} class
.R704 at the Victoria Railway Museum	R class	4-6-4	R 700 – R 769	North British Locomotive Company	1951–1974	70	7	2 at 707 Operations; 1 at Hunter Valley Railway; 1 at Newport Railway Museum; 3 at Steamrail; 63 scrapped
	R^{Y} class	0-6-0	R^{Y} 447 – R^{Y} 495(odd only)	?	1899–1951	25	0	15 reclassed to Y class; 10 scrapped
	S class	4-6-0	197 – 215 (odd only) ‡, S 197 – S 215 (odd only)	Phoenix Foundry	1882–1908	10	0	1 converted to W class; 9 scrapped
Builder's photo of S300, 1928	S class	4-6-2	S 300 – S 303	VR Newport Workshops	1928–1954	4	0	All scrapped; 1 tender at Seymour Railway Heritage Centre; 1 tender at Steamrail
T94 at the Victoria Railway Museum	T class	0-6-0	125 ‡, 249 – 283 (odd only) ‡, T 1 – T 4, T 125, T 249 – T 283 (odd only), T 90 – T 92 §, T 94 §, T 96 §	Beyer, Peacock & Co. (6); Phoenix Foundry (18)	1874–1953	24	1	4 ex-Deniliquin and Moama Railway Company; 1 at Newport Railway Museum
	U class	0-6-0	107 – 123 (odd only) ‡, U 107 – U 123 (odd only)	Phoenix Foundry	1874–1908	9	0	All scrapped
	Old V class	0-6-0	1 – 4 †, 2 – 5 †, 11 – 17 (odd only) ‡, V 11 – V 17 (odd only), 497	George England & Co.	1859–1904	4	0	All scrapped
	V class	2-8-0	V 499 – V 529 (odd only), V 200 – V 204 §, V 206 §, V 210 – V 215 §	Baldwin Locomotive Works (1); Phoenix Foundry (15)	1900–1930	16	0	All scrapped
	W class	4-6-0	153 ‡, 155 ‡, 217 – 235 (odd only) ‡, W 153, W 155, W 197, W 217 – W 235 (odd only)	Baldwin Locomotive Works	1880–1926; 1933–1934	13	0	1 sold 1925, bought back 1933; All scrapped
	X class	0-6-0	X 353 – X 381 (odd only)	Phoenix Foundry	1886–1920	15	0	All scrapped
X39, built new in 1938 with visible design changes including Modified Front End 'flowerpot' funnel, smoke deflectors, and Belpaire firebox with combustion chamber	X class	2-8-2	X 27 – X 55	VR Newport Workshops	1929–1960	29	1	1 at Newport Railway Museum; 28 scrapped
Y108 at the Victoria Railway Museum. Missing 1 section of boiler cladding and dome	Y class	0-6-0	Y 383 – Y 441 (odd only), Y 445, Y 400 – Y 423 (various), Y 453 – Y 483 (various), Y 100 – Y 132 §	Kitson & Co. (1); Phoenix Foundry (30) ex-RY class (15)	1889–1963	46	2	1 converted to a private diesel-mechanical locomotive; 1 at Newport Railway Museum; 1 at Steamrail; 28 scrapped
=== Garratt locomotives ===
G42 at Puffing Billy Railway in August 2007	G class	2-6-0+0-6-2	G 41 – G 42	Beyer, Peacock & Co.	1926–1964	2	1	1 to Puffing Billy Railway
=== Petrol/Diesel Electric Locomotives ===
V/Line MK1 Livery A66 at Bendigo Station - July 2022	A class	Co-Co	A 60 – A 85	Ex-B class / Clyde Engineering	1984–Current	11	5	Rebuilt from B class; 1 with V/Line heritage; 1 at 707 Operations; 1 at Seymour Railway Heritage Centre; 1 with Southern Shorthaul Railroad; 1 stored North Bendigo; 6 scrapped
B80 on a works train at Camberwell	B class	Co-Co	B 60 – B 85	Clyde Engineering	1952–Current	26	10	11 converted to A class; 3 with Southern Shorthaul Railroad; 1 at Newport Railway Museum; 1 at Seymour Railway Heritage Centre; 2 at Steamrail; 3 stored North Bendigo; 5 scrapped
Silverton Rail Cs1 in July 1998	C class	Co-Co	C 501 – C 510	Clyde Engineering	1977–Current	10	10	3 with Rail First Asset Management; 6 with Southern Shorthaul Railroad; 1 at Seymour Railway Heritage Centre
Preserved F202 at the Seymour Railway Heritage Centre in October 2005	F class	0-6-0DE	F 310 – F 319, SEC 1 – SEC 6 F 201 – F 216 §	Dick, Kerr & Co.	1951–1987	16	6	1 at 707 Operations; 2 at Newport Railway Museum; 1 at Victorian Goldfields Railway; 2 stored with VicTrack; 10 scrapped
Pacific National G533 in February 2007	G class	Co-Co	G 511 – G 543	Clyde Engineering	1984–Current	33	31	2 with Aurizon; 2 with Linx Cargo Care Group; 20 with Pacific National; 2 with Qube; 2 with Rail First Asset Management; 2 with Southern Shorthaul Railroad; 1 with Watco Australia; 2 scrapped
Pacific National H1 at Kensington in June 2012	H class	Bo-Bo	H 1 – H 5	Clyde Engineering	1968–2020	5	4	Heavy shunting derivative based on Y class design; 2 at 707 Operations; 2 stored Seymour; 1 scrapped
N469 at Southern Cross in August 2006	N class	Co-Co	N 451 – N 475	Clyde Engineering	1985–Current	25	25	25 with V/Line
V/Line P11 at Southern Cross in September 2010	P class	Bo-Bo	P 11 – P 23	Ex-T class / Clyde Engineering	1984–Current	13	13	Rebuilt from T class (flat-top series); 2 with Ettamogah Rail Hub; 1 with Pacific National; 5 with Southern Shorthaul Railroad; 3 with V/Line; 2 at Seymour Rail Heritage Centre
Pacific National liveried S307 at Newport Workshops in March 2008	S class	Co-Co	S 300 – S 317	Clyde Engineering	1957–Current	18	12	1 with Pacific National; 4 with Southern Shorthaul Railroad; 1 at 707 Operations; 1 at Canberra Railway Museum; 1 at Newport Railway Museum; 3 at Seymour Railway Heritage Centre; 1 at Steamrail; 6 scrapped
T373 in CFCLA at McIntyre Loop, Melbourne	T class	Bo-Bo	T 320 – T 413	Clyde Engineering	1955–Current	94	36	13 converted to P class; 4 converted to CK class; 1 with Greentrains; 5 with Pacific National; 1 with Rail First Asset Management; 3 with SCT Logistics; 4 with Southern Shorthaul Railroad; 3 with Watco Australia; 2 at 707 Operations; 2 at Mornington Railway; 1 at Newport Railway Museum; 7 at Seymour Railway Heritage Centre; 4 at Steamrail; 1 at Victorian Goldfields Railway; 1 at Yarra Valley Railway; 1 privately owned; 4 sold as stationary generators; 1 sold for CK spare parts; 37 scrapped
Freight Australia SCT train V544/G538/G539 in the Swan Valley, Western Australia.	V Class	Co-Co	V544	EDI Rail	2002–Current	1	1	Currently with Aurizon
VL355 at North Dynon	VL class	Co-Co	VL351 – VL362	Avteq	2007–Current	12	12	5 with Qube; 3 with Rail First Asset Management; 1 with SCT Logistics; 2 with Southern Shorthaul Railroad; 1 with Sydney Rail Services
X43 in V/Line Freight livery in Mildura	X class	Co-Co	X 31 – X 54	Clyde Engineering	1966–Current	24	11	6 converted to XR class; 6 with Pacific National; 2 with SCT Logistics; 1 at East Coast Heritage Rail; 2 at Seymour Railway Heritage Centre; 7 scrapped
XR 558 and XR552 at the Grain Loop, Geelong	XR class	Co-Co	XR 550 – XR 559	Ex-X class (6) / South Dynon Workshops (3)	2002–Current	9	9	6 rebuilt from X class; 3 built new; 9 with Pacific National
XRB561 at South Dynon in June 2006	XRB class	Co-Co	XRB 560 – XRB 562	South Dynon Workshops	2005–Current	3	3	Cabless booster units based on XR class design; 3 with Pacific National
Y145 at Newport Workshops in 2006	Y class	Bo-Bo	Y 101 – Y 175	Clyde Engineering	1963–Current	75	31	1 with BlueScope Steel; 1 with EDI-Rail; 1 with Pacific National; 1 with Progress-Rail Cardiff; 5 with Ettamogah Rail Hub; 4 with V/Line; 3 at 707 Operations; 1 at Daylesford Spa Country Railway; 2 at DERMPAV; 1 at Newport Railway Museum; 4 at Seymour Railway Heritage Centre; 1 at Steamrail; 4 at Victorian Goldfields Railway; 2 at Yarra Valley Railway; 44 scrapped
=== Petrol/Diesel Hydraulic Locomotives ===
	M class	0-6-0DH	M 231 – M 232	VR Newport Workshops	1959–?	2	1	2 at Steamrail
V56 at the Victoria Railway Museum	V class	0-4-0DH	V 56	VR Newport Workshops	1960–1992	1	1	1 at Newport Railway Museum
W255 at the Victoria Railway Museum	W class	0-6-0DH	W 241 – W 267	Tulloch Limited	1959–1989	27	5	1 at Mornington Railway; 2 at Newport Railway Museum; 1 at Yarra Valley Railway; 1 stored with VicTrack; 22 scrapped
=== Petrol/Diesel Mechanical Locomotives ===
RT 20 in Swan Hill, featuring Freight Australia livery	RT class	4wPM; 4wDM	RT 1 – RT 54	VR Newport Workshops	1932–Current	54	?	1 at Newport Railway Museum; 1 at Victorian Goldfields Railway; 2 at Yarra Valley Railway; At least 1 at Bendigo Rail Workshops
=== Electric Locomotives ===
Original steeplecab locomotive 1101	No. 1100 & 1101	Bo-Bo	1100 – 1101	VR Newport Workshops	1923–1954	2	0	All scrapped
E 1102, preserved at the Newport Railway Museum	E class	Bo-Bo	E 1102 – E 1111	VR Newport Workshops & VR Jolimont Workshops	1928–1983	10	4	1 at Newport Railway Museum; 3 at Steamrail; 6 scrapped
L1150 at the Victoria Railway Museum	L class	Co-Co	L 1150 – L 1174	English Electric	1953–1987	25	4	1 at Newport Railway Museum; 3 at Steamrail; 21 scrapped
=== Other ===
	RTL class	–	RTL 1	Western Star Trucks	1995–Current	1	1	Road Transferable Locomotive; With Just Track
Image	Class	Wheel arrangement	Fleet number(s)	Manufacturer	Years in service	Quantity made	Quantity remaining	Comments

† Early sequential numbering
‡ Loco numbers pre class letter
§ Renumbering

== See also ==
- List of Australian diesel locomotives
- List of Western Australian locomotive classes
- NSWGR steam locomotive classification
- Queensland Railways steam locomotive classification
- Rail transport in Victoria
