= Victorian Railways H class (1877) =

Class of 8 Australian 4-4-0 locomotives

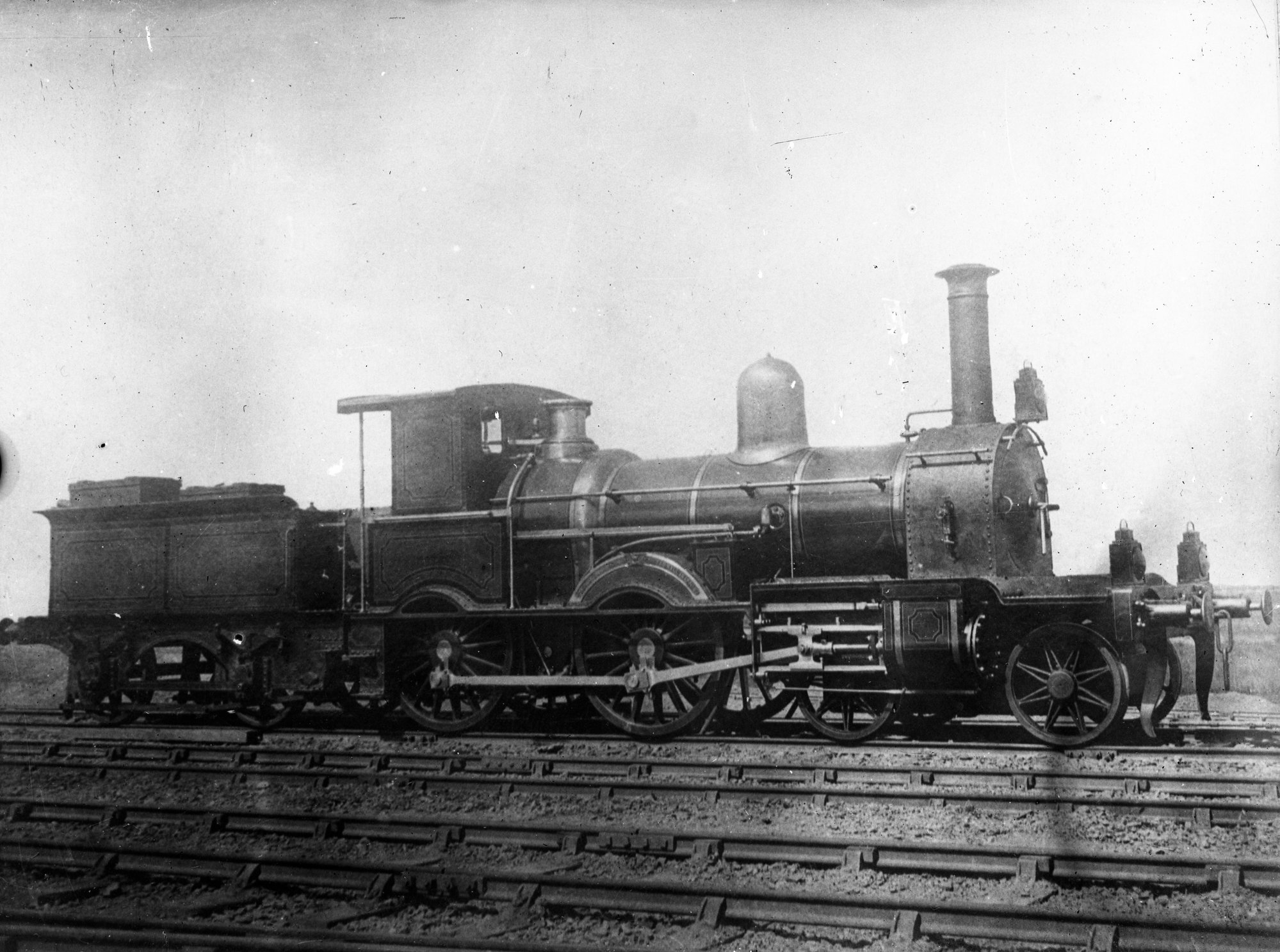
- Unidentified H class 4-4-0 at Ballarat, date unknown
Type and origin
- Power type: Steam
- Designer: William Meikle
- Builder: Phoenix Foundry
- Serial number: 40-47
- Build date: 1877-1878
- Total produced: 8
Specifications
- Configuration
  - Whyte: 4-4-0
- Gauge: 5 ft 3 in (1,600 mm) Victorian broad gauge
- Leading dia.: 3 ft 1 1/2 in (952 mm)
- Driver dia.: 5 ft 0 in (1,520 mm)
- Wheelbase: 34 ft 1 in (10.39 m)
- Length: 42 ft 0 in (12.80 m)
- Height: 13 feet 0 inches (3.96 m)
- Axle load: 10 long tons 7 cwt (23,200 lb or 10.5 t)
- Loco weight: 32 long tons 7 cwt (72,500 lb or 32.9 t)
- Tender weight: 16 long tons 3 cwt (36,200 lb or 16.4 t)
- Total weight: 48 long tons 10 cwt (108,600 lb or 49.3 t)
- Fuel type: Coal
- Fuel capacity: 60 long cwt (6,700 lb or 3,000 kg)
- Water cap.: 1,223 imp gal (5,560 L; 1,469 US gal)
- Boiler pressure: Nos. 146, 148, 152 (1904): 120 psi (827 kPa); Nos. 154, 156 (1904): 125 psi (862 kPa); Nos. 150, 158, 160 (1904): 130 psi (896 kPa)
- Heating surface
  - Firebox: 72.89 sq ft (6.772 m^{2})
  - Tubes: 794.85 sq ft (73.844 m^{2})
  - Total surface: 867.74 sq ft (81 m^{2})
- Cylinders: 2
- Cylinder size: 15 in × 22 in (381 mm × 559 mm)
Performance figures
- Tractive effort: 8,250 lbf (36.7 kN) at 100 psi
Career
- Operators: Victorian Railways; Trawalla and Waterloo Tramway
- Numbers: H146-H160 (even only)
- First run: September 1877
- Last run: 19 February 1916 (38.5 years)
- Disposition: 1 tender preserved at Newport Railway Museum, all engine units scrapped.

The Victorian Railways H class was a class of 4-4-0 light line passenger locomotives operated by the Victorian Railways between 1877 and 1916.

== History ==
During the late 1870s, William Meikle designed a pair of 4-4-0 locomotives and had them constructed at Williamstown Workshops. The locomotives were built using spare parts of engines from the Geelong and Melbourne Railway Company and were numbered 38 and 40 (later G class). Meikle modified the design and placed an order of eight from the Phoenix Foundry of Ballarat in 1877. While they were originally unclassed, they were designated "H" in 1886.

=== Production ===
The locomotives were similar to the 1874 K class and G class in both power and weight, but with driving wheels 5 feet (1.5 m) in diameter rather than 4 feet (1.2 m). One strange feature was the inexplicably small grate area. Four-wheeled tenders with a 7-foot (2.1 m) wheelbase were fitted.

=== Regular service ===
H150 was noted as being in motor service in 1908.

=== Accidents ===
- 26 January 1881 - H160 in accident at Beaufort
- 26 July 1881 - H160 collided with F98 at Beaufort
- 1889 - H152 broke driving axle

=== Withdrawal ===
All the locomotives were removed from the Victorian Railways register between 1905 and 1916. The boiler of H156 went to the Bendigo sheds in 1912.

H150 was sold to the Trawalla and Waterloo Tramway for £600 on 31 May 1909 and was later sold to Smith and Timms, in 1912. It was last seen in 1922 at the Mile End rail yards in South Australia.

A tender of one of the H class locomotives is preserved at the Newport Railway Museum, attached to Crane No. 2. The tender had last been used on Crane No. 3 (ex-Z526) until its withdrawal in 1978.

== Fleet summary ==
Key:	In Service	Preserved	Stored or Withdrawn	Scrapped

Locomotive	Builder No.	Entered service	Withdrawn	Scrapped	Status	Notes
H146	40	September 1877	19 August 1905		Scrapped	
H148	41	October 1877	26 August 1905		Scrapped	
H150	42	December 1877	31 May 1909		Scrapped	Sold to Trawalla and Waterloo Tramway - 31 May 1909. Sold to Smith and Timms, SA - 1912. Last seen at Mile End, SA - 1922
H152	43	January 1878	28 July 1906		Scrapped	Boiler to Bendigo shed
H154	44	May 1878	18 March 1905		Scrapped	
H156	45	May 1878	15 July 1911		Scrapped	
H158	46	May 1878	19 February 1916		Scrapped	
H160	47	June 1878	30 March 1907		Scrapped	
