= Geelong and Melbourne Railway Company 2-2-2WT (1855) =

Steam locomotive class

Geelong and Melbourne Railway 2-2-2WT
Type and origin
- Power type: Steam
- Rebuilder: William Meikle
- Rebuild date: 1872
- Number rebuilt: 2
Specifications
- Configuration
  - Whyte: 2-2-2WT; 34 rebuilt: 0-6-0WT; 36 rebuilt: 2-4-0WT
- Gauge: 5 ft 3 in (1,600 mm) Victorian broad gauge
- Leading dia.: 3 ft 6 in (1,070 mm)
- Driver dia.: 6 ft 6 in (1,980 mm)
- Trailing dia.: 3 ft 6 in (1,070 mm)
Career
- Operators: Geelong and Melbourne Railway Company, Victorian Railways
- Number in class: 4
- Numbers: Victorian Railways: 34, 36, 38, 40
- First run: July 1856
- Last run: July 1889 (33 years)
- Disposition: Scrapped

The Geelong and Melbourne Railway Company operated a total of four 2-2-2WT locomotives between 1856 and 1860. They were later operated by the Victorian Railways between 1860 and 1889.

== History ==
=== Titania and Oberon ===
Titania and Oberon
Type and origin
- Builder: Robert Stephenson and Company, Newcastle-upon-Tyne, England
- Serial number: 1006 & 1007
- Build date: 1855
- Total produced: 2
Specifications
- Fuel type: Coke
- Fuel capacity: 9 long cwt (0.46 t)
- Water cap.: 615 imp gal (2,800 L)
- Cylinders: 2
- Cylinder size: 12 in × 22 in (305 mm × 559 mm)

The first two locomotives were built by Robert Stephenson and Company, being completed and shipped on the vessel Thames on the 1st of August 1855. The first locomotive (serial number 1006) would be named Titania and the second (serial number 1007) would be named Oberon.

==== Titania - No. 34 ====
Sold to Victorian Railways for £2,756/15 on 3 September 1860, became No.34. Used as a shunter at Williamstown Workshops in 1872. Sold to Swan Hill Shire for £800 in June 1889. Sold to H.V. McKay & Co. (Sunshine Harvester Works). Historical Society of Victoria ask to be retained on 12 September 1925. H.V.McKay & Co. presented one brass number plate to ARHS in 1949.

==== Oberon - No. 36 ====
Sold to Victorian Railways for £2,756/15 on 3 September 1860 and became No. 36. Used as a shunter at Williamstown Workshops in 1872. Sold to Riley Bros. for £500 in June 1889.

=== Typhoon and Sirocco ===
Typhoon and Sirocco
Type and origin
- Builder: Stothert, Slaughter and Company, Bristol, England
- Build date: 1855
- Total produced: 2
Specifications
- Cylinders: 2
- Cylinder size: 15 in × 20 in (381 mm × 508 mm)

==== Typhoon - No. 38 ====
Sold to Victorian Railways for £4031/15 on 3 September 1860 and became No. 38. Sold for use as stationary engine in 1872.

==== Sirocco - No. 40 ====
Sold to Victorian Railways for £3761/15 on 3 September 1860 and became No. 40. Became a stationary engine at Williamstown Workshops in 1872.
