= Victorian Railways G class (1877) =

Class of Australian steam locomotives

- G Class No.44. photographed at an unknown location.
Type and origin
- Power type: Steam
- Designer: Meikle
- Builder: Williamstown Workshops
- Build date: 1877
- Total produced: 2
Specifications
- Configuration
  - Whyte: 4-4-0
- Gauge: 5 ft 3 in (1,600 mm) Victorian broad gauge
- Leading dia.: 3 ft 1 1/2 in (952 mm)
- Driver dia.: 4 ft 0 in (1,220 mm)
- Tender wheels: 4 ft 0 in (1,220 mm)
- Wheelbase: 34 ft 4 1/2 in (10.478 m)
- Length: 42 ft 8 1/2 in (13.018 m)
- Height: 12 ft 6 in (3.81 m)
- Axle load: 10 long tons 14 cwt (24,000 lb or 10.9 t)
- Loco weight: 30 long tons 7 cwt (68,000 lb or 30.8 t)
- Tender weight: 20 long tons 15 cwt (46,500 lb or 21.1 t)
- Total weight: 51 long tons 2 cwt (114,500 lb or 51.9 t)
- Fuel type: Coal
- Fuel capacity: 60 long cwt (6,700 lb or 3,000 kg)
- Water cap.: 1,698 imp gal (7,720 L; 2,039 US gal)
- Boiler pressure: No. 38 (1904):120 psi (827 kPa); No. 44 (1904):130 psi (896 kPa)
- Heating surface
  - Firebox: 82.40 sq ft (7.655 m^{2})
  - Tubes: 794.85 sq ft (73.844 m^{2})
  - Total surface: 877.25 sq ft (81 m^{2})
- Cylinders: 2
- Cylinder size: 15 in × 18 in (381 mm × 457 mm)
Performance figures
- Tractive effort: 8,437 lbf (37.53 kN) at 100 psi
Career
- Operators: Victorian Railways
- Numbers: G38, G44
- First run: January 1877
- Last run: 13 August 1904 (27.6 years)
- Disposition: 2 scrapped

The Victorian Railways G class was a class of 4-4-0 light line passenger locomotives operated by the Victorian Railways between 1877 and 1904.

== History ==
Numbered 38 and 44, numbers vacated by two withdrawn Geelong and Melbourne Railway Company engines. Classed 'G' in 1886.

=== Production ===
Built by the Williamstown Workshops in 1877. Design was similar to the 1874 K class in both power and weight. The four-wheel bogie instead of a fixed axle at the front reduced the maximum wheel load a little and improved lateral stability. All Meikle engines had been fitted with almost standard four-wheeled tenders, differing only in minor details, but this new design had a wheelbase of 8 feet compared with 7 feet and had a larger capacity.

=== Regular service ===
Based at Castlemaine in the 1890s presumably for the Maldon line.

=== Design improvements ===
Both reboilering in 1882. No.38 fitted with an extended smokebox.

=== Withdrawal ===
Both the locomotives were scrapped in 1904.

== Fleet summary ==
Key:	In Service	Preserved	Stored or Withdrawn	Scrapped

Locomotive	Builder No.	Entered service	Withdrawn	Scrapped	Status	Notes
G38		February 1877	8 August 1904		Scrapped	
G44		January 1877	13 August 1904		Scrapped	
