= Victorian Railways No.100 (1872) =

Class of Australian 2-4-0 steam locomotives

Type and origin
- Power type: Steam
- Designer: William Meikle
- Builder: VR - Williamstown Workshops
- Build date: 1872
- Total produced: 1
Specifications
- Configuration
  - Whyte: 2-4-0
- Gauge: 5 ft 3 in (1,600 mm) Victorian broad gauge
- Leading dia.: 4 ft 0 in (1.22 m)
- Driver dia.: 5 ft 0 in (1,520 mm)
- Tender wheels: 4 ft 0 in (1.22 m)
- Wheelbase: 33 ft 1 in (10.08 m)
  - Coupled: 7 ft 6 in (2,290 mm)
  - Tender: 11 ft 0 in (3.35 m)
- Length
  - Over couplers: 45 ft 7 1/2 in (13.907 m)
- Height: 13 ft 1 1/2 in (4.001 m)
- Axle load: 11 long tons 13 cwt (26,100 lb or 11.8 t); 1904 diagram: 12 long tons 2 cwt (27,100 lb or 12.3 t); 1914 diagram: 12 long tons 9 cwt (27,900 lb or 12.6 t)
- Loco weight: 28 long tons 10 cwt (63,800 lb or 29 t); 1904 diagram: 29 long tons 11 cwt (66,200 lb or 30 t); 1914 diagram: 30 long tons 12 cwt (68,500 lb or 31.1 t)
- Tender weight: 23 long tons 15 cwt (53,200 lb or 24.1 t); 1904 diagram: 27 long tons 10 cwt (61,600 lb or 27.9 t); 1914 diagram: 28 long tons 0 cwt (62,700 lb or 28.4 t)
- Total weight: 52 long tons 5 cwt (117,000 lb or 53.1 t); 1904 diagram: 57 long tons 1 cwt (127,800 lb or 58 t); 1914 diagram: 58 long tons 12 cwt (131,300 lb or 59.5 t)
- Fuel capacity: 60 long cwt (6,700 lb or 3,000 kg); 1904 diagram: 95 long cwt (10,600 lb or 4,800 kg)
- Water cap.: 1,948 imp gal (8,860 L; 2,339 US gal); 1904 diagram: 1,975 imp gal (8,980 L; 2,372 US gal)
- Firebox
  - Grate area: 12.08 sq ft (1.122 m^{2}); 1904 diagram: 14.30 sq ft (1.329 m^{2})
- Boiler pressure: 130 psi (896 kPa); 1914 diagram: 140 psi (965 kPa)
- Heating surface
  - Firebox: 86.03 sq ft (7.992 m^{2}); 1904 diagram: 83.70 sq ft (8 m^{2})
  - Tubes: 1,082.21 sq ft (100.541 m^{2}); 1904 diagram: 1,088.10 sq ft (101 m^{2})
  - Total surface: 1,168.24 sq ft (109 m^{2}); 1904 diagram: 1,171.80 sq ft (109 m^{2})
- Cylinders: 2, inside
- Cylinder size: 16 in × 22 in (406 mm × 559 mm)
Performance figures
- Tractive effort: 1904 diagram: 9,762 lbf (43.42 kN); 1914 diagram: 10,513 lbf (46.76 kN)
Career
- Operators: Victorian Railways
- Number in class: 1
- Numbers: 100
- Delivered: 1872
- First run: 24 January 1872
- Last run: 1916 (44.6 years)
- Withdrawn: 1916
- Disposition: Scrapped

The Victorian Railways No. 100 was the first government built steam locomotive on Victorian Railways. It was a 2-4-0 passenger locomotive operated by the Victorian Railways between 1872 and 1916, built by Williamstown Workshops.

== History ==
From the late 1860s, the Victorian Railways used odd numbers for goods locomotives and even numbers for passenger locos, this engine was numbered 100. This odd and even system remained in use until 1912. In 1886, they were allocated to Class E, but became unclassed again in 1889 when that letter was allotted to the Kitson tanks.

=== Production ===
This locomotive was built in 1872 following a recommendation from a Board of Enquiry that tradesmen could be employed in their spare time in the manufacture of locomotives.

=== Regular service ===
It was used for passenger services on the Bendigo and North-Eastern lines before it was eventually being used exclusively on the Governor's and later Railway Commissioners' special inspection trains.

=== Design improvements ===
Over the years they were fitted with various alterations to the cabs. There were also various upgrades over the years; with constant improvements to safety — these including things like updates to safety valves (and domes), smokeboxs and chimneys (with spark arrestors), and brakes.
It received a new boiler of same pressure in 1885, and another larger one in 1904 with a working pressure of 140psi.

=== Accidents ===
- Derailed into a turntable pit at North Melbourne

=== Demise ===
It was withdrawn in 1916.

== Fleet summary ==
Key:	In service	Preserved	Stored or withdrawn	Scrapped

Locomotive	Previous numbers	Builder no.	Entered service	Withdrawn	Scrapped	Status	Notes
100	E100	-	24 January 1872	1916	1916	Scrapped	Reboilered - 1885. Reboilered - 1904
