= Geelong and Melbourne Railway Company 0-4-0T (1855) =

Class of Australian locomotive

Geelong and Melbourne Railway 0-4-0T
Type and origin
- Power type: Steam
- Builder: Walker & Munro, Geelong
- Build date: 1855
- Total produced: 1
Specifications
- Configuration
  - Whyte: 0-4-0VBT
- Gauge: 5 ft 3 in (1,600 mm) Victorian broad gauge
- Fuel type: Coke
- Fuel capacity: 52 long cwt (2.6 t)
Career
- Operators: Geelong & Melbourne Railway Company, Victorian Railways
- Number in class: 1
- Numbers: Ariel
- First run: December 1855
- Last run: c. 1864 (8.9 years)
- Scrapped: c. 1893
- Disposition: Sold

The Geelong & Melbourne Railway Company operated a total of 1 locomotive that fell under the Whyte notation of 0-4-0T, with a Vertical boiler, between 1855 and 1860. Later it was operated by the Victorian Railways between 1860 and 1893. This was the second locomotive manufactured in Australia (Note, the first was MHBR's 2-2-2WT the year before).

== History ==
The Geelong & Melbourne Railway Company never numbered their locomotives, but instead gave them individual names, the 0-4-0VBT was named Ariel. It was used as an inspection engine. It was sold to Victorian Railways on 3 September 1860, where it would carry no number and no class name, as was the standard for Victorian Railways until 1886. Converted to pumping engine c. 1864. It was noted as still in existence by the Engineer-in-Chief's correspondence 11 July 1892 and was proposed to be convert to a tram motor for the St Albans line. Noted as sold to John Danks & Co., a machinery and engineering supplies merchant of Melbourne, c. 1893. The Ballarat Historical Society wrote to the Railways Department 17 June 1897 asking on what terms they could have 'Ariel'.
