= Langlands foundry =

Langlands foundry was Melbourne's first foundry and iron shipbuilder (1842–97). It was established in 1842 (only 8 years after the founding of the colony) by two Scottish immigrants, Robert Langlands (son of John Langlands, baker, of Dundee) and Thomas Fulton (ironmaster) (1813–1859) who had formed a partnership before emigrating. the business was known as the 'Langlands Foundry Co'.

Henry Langlands (1794-1863), left Scotland in 1846 with his wife Christian, née Thoms. and five surviving children to join his brother Robert. By the time he arrived in early January 1847 the partnership of Langlands and Fulton had dissolved as Fulton had gone off to establish his own works, and the two brothers took over ownership of Langlands foundry. Several years later Robert retired and Henry became sole proprietor.

The foundry was originally located on Flinders Lane between King and Spencer Streets. Their sole machine tool, when they commenced business, was a small slide rest lathe turned by foot In about 1865 they moved to the south side of the river, to the Yarra bank near the Spencer Street Bridge, (now occupied by the Robur Tea building), and then in about 1886 they moved to Grant Street, South Melbourne, (later occupied by a subsidiary of the British steel firm Dorman Long.

The works employed as many as 350 workers manufacturing a wide range of marine, mining, civil engineering, railway and general manufacturing components including engines and boilers. The foundry prospered despite high wages and the lack of raw materials. It became known for high quality products that competed successfully with any imported articles. By the time of his retirement (shortly before his death), the foundry was one of the largest employers in the Victoria and was responsible for casting the first bell and lamp-posts in the colony. It also cast the boiler of the first train to run in Australia on the Hobson's Bay Railway and successfully launched the first iron vessel, a river tug 109 feet (33 m) in length. This event was cheered by over 3000 spectators. The business was carried on by his sons after Henry's death.

The company was responsible for fabricating the boiler for the first railway locomotive to operate in Australia, a 2-2-2WT configuration built in 1854 by Robertson, Martin & Smith for the Melbourne & Hobson's Bay Railway Company. In the 1860s, they commenced manufacture of cast iron pipes for the Melbourne & Metropolitan Board of Works, which was then laying the first reticulated water supply system in Melbourne.

Langlands was well known for its gold mining equipment, being the first company in Victoria to take up the manufacture of mining machinery, and it played an important role in equipping Victoria's and Australia's first mineral boom in the 1850s and '60s. The company's products including stamper batteries and ore crushing mills, were distributed over Australasia from Charters Towers to the Thames goldfields of New Zealand. The first stamp mills made in Australia were manufactured by Langlands, who devised the first stamper system based on the principle of the stamp and shank being rotated by the lifting cam, thus equalizing the wear on the stamp. Up to that time the shanks were square and did not rotate. While this was an invention of Fulton, he did not patent the idea, and so it was quickly copied all over the world.

Major facilities included a Bessemer converter (1887) to produce steel and a cast-iron pipe-making shop which produced water, sewerage and hydraulic pipes, and structural columns, including those for Princes Bridge.

The firm also exported equipment and technology, such as its fitting out of the Nelson City Gas Works New Zealand.

Langlands Foundry was an incubator for a number of engineers including Herbert Austin (1866–1941) who worked as a fitter at Langlands, and went on to both work on the Wolesely Shearing machine and to found the Austin Motor Company.

In the early "nineties" the firm declined and was bought up by the Austral Otis Co. in about 1893. Fulton retired from the firm before this date and practised as a consulting engineer. The company motif comprised a stamp with belt and buckle motif.
