= Robertson, Martin & Smith =

- Founded: 1853
- Defunct: 1855
- Successor: William Robertson & co
- Headquarters: Melbourne, Australia
- Key people: William B. Robertson, John Martin and William Smith

Robertson, Martin and Smith was an engineering firm in Melbourne in the second half of the nineteenth century. The company manufactured the first steam locomotive to be built in Australia.

Robertson, Martin and Smith comprised a partnership of William B. Robertson, an English born engineer; John Martin; and William Smith. The company was operating from at least mid 1853 with an office in “Lambeth-place” on Flinders-lane west in central Melbourne, when they advertised for labourers, through a proclamation in the Government Gazette. In June they tendered for the construction of a steam gondola for the Cremorne Gardens a pleasure ground on the Yarra River in Richmond.

When the Melbourne and Hobson's Bay Railway Company began construction of the first steam-hauled railway line to operate in Australia, they ordered locomotives from the renowned British engineering firm of Robert Stephenson and Company. However, the ship was delayed, and so the railway looked to the firm that had previously constructed a small donkey engine for hauling supplies along the line during construction. The boiler was made by Langlands foundry and Robertson, Martin & Smith assembled it at a rented premises on the Maribyrnong River.

The locomotive was completed in just ten weeks and cost £2,700. Forming the first steam train to travel in Australia, a 2-2-2WT locomotive which first ran in trials on 9 September 1854, and then commenced regular trips on 12 September 1854.

The firm used the then vacant bluestone buildings of Joseph Raleigh's boiling down works on the Saltwater River (i.e. the Maribyrnong) near Footscray, to erect the locomotive. Raleigh had died in 1852, so it appears the buildings were not in use at the time.

The partnership was dissolved on 10 July 1855.
