= Victorian Railways Z class =

Class of Australian 2-4-0T and 1 Australian 0-6-0T steam locomotives

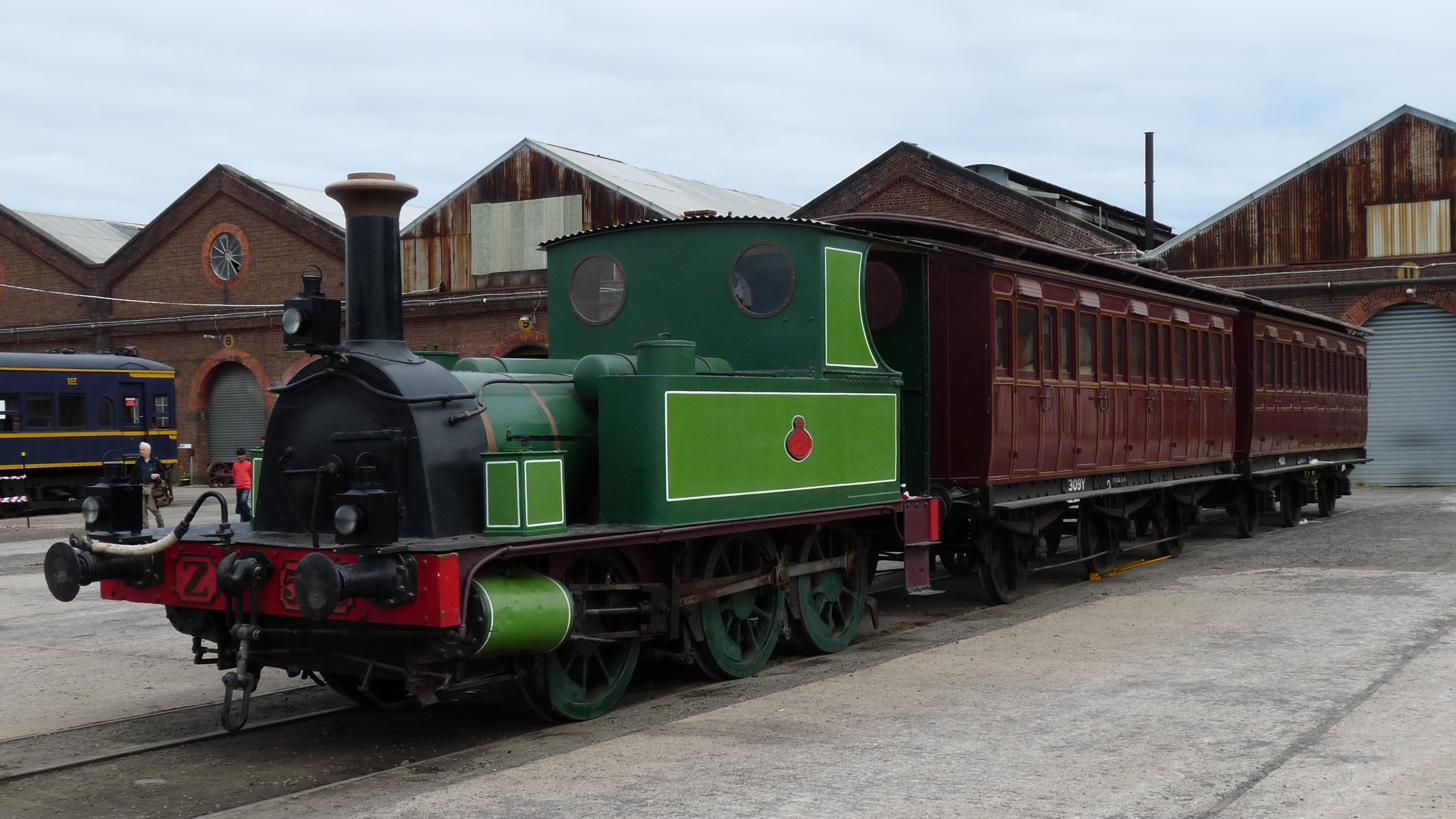
- Z 526 on display at Newport Railway Workshops, 2016
Type and origin
- Power type: Steam
- Builder: Stephenson Valve Gear
- Serial number: 522, 524, 526
- Total produced: 3
Specifications
- Configuration
  - Whyte: 2-4-0T, 0-6-0T
- Gauge: 1,600 mm (5 ft 3 in)
- Length: 7.23m, 6.83m
Career
- Operators: Victorian Railways
- Number in class: 3

The Victorian Railways Z class were three locomotives built in 1893 in Victoria, Australia. The class is unusual in that the third member of the class bore little resemblance to the first two. One example of the class is preserved, and survives at the Scienceworks Museum in Melbourne.

== Z 522 and Z 524 ==
Built in 1893 by the Phoenix Foundry of Ballarat, the first two were 2-4-0T locomotives which had their full length covered in with an extended cab in the style of a road tramway motor. They were allocated numbers 522 and 524 with the classification Z. Their full length cabs were later cut back to a normal length revealing a thin chimney and a drum-shaped dome. They were scrapped in 1910 and 1911.

== Z 526 ==
=== In service ===
The third engine built was an outside cylinder 0-6-0T locomotive, entering service on 30 April 1893. It was the first of 536 locomotives built by the new enlarged railway workshops at Newport. It was numbered 526, and despite bearing little resemblance to the two Phoenix locomotives, it was also classified Z, perhaps because no more letters were available except "I" which would have been avoided because it resembled the number "1". In 1903 it was rebuilt as a crane locomotive as No. 3 Steam Crane, entering service in this form on 23 January 1904.

The engine was initially based at Princes Bridge railway station and North Melbourne Locomotive Depot through the mid to late 1890s, though it was known to be present at Sale in May 1896. In this form it would have worked short passenger trains and as a yard pilot, shunting carriages.

The engine was returned to Newport Workshops in 1903 and rebuilt with a crane fitted over the boiler, re-entering service as Steam Crane No.3 on 23 January 1904. The crane had a lifting capacity of 5 LT (5.1 t). The conversion included provision of a small tender to compensate for steam consumption by the crane, recycled from a withdrawn J class (1859) locomotive with capacity 2,000 imp gal (9,100 L) water and 3.25 LT (3,300 kg) coal. This was later swapped for a tender from a K class (1874). As a crane locomotive it was generally based at North Melbourne, kept crewed and in steam constantly to be available for immediate deployment at any derailment or other incident. While there, it earned the name 'Polly'. It is known to have been present at the recovery effort following the Sunshine rail disaster on 20 April 1908, and at other incidents at Riddells Creek railway station, Beveridge railway station and at Harvey Creek near Molesworth railway station.

It was sighted working as a shunter at Newport Workshops on 2 September 1960, sans its normal tender but instead working with a short flat wagon apparently labelled "No.4 Crane tender", though by 1965 it was back at North Melbourne depot with a coal and water tender fitted. In 1967 it was sighted in Melbourne Yard.

When the North Melbourne locomotive depot closed the engine was moved to the nearby South Dynon Locomotive Depot, until being withdrawn on 16 June 1978.

=== Preservation ===
As part of the Victorian 150th Anniversary celebrations, and in the lead up to Australia's bicentenary, the City of Williamstown decided to invest in a restoration of Steam Crane No.3, "Polly", to its original 1893 form as Z526. The Victorian Railways representative, George Brown, agreed that when withdrawn the engine would be restored to its original condition as an exhibit at the Newport Railway Museum.

Restoration work started in 1980 at Newport Workshops. In August 1981 it reclaimed its original identity and general outline, though finishing touches were still required and the project continued through to 1985. During this time, the Science Museum, later the Museum of Victoria, proposed that the engine should be placed on display in a glass case near the preserved Cable Tram outside the Russell Street entrance to Melbourne Museum; the Railways accepted this idea and the Council later agreed. In 1992. the engine was formally donated to Museum Victoria.
