= Melbourne and Hobson's Bay Railway Company 2-2-2WT (1854) =

Short railway line opened in Victoria, Australia in 1854

Type and origin
- Power type: Steam
- Builder: Robertson, Martin & Smith
- Build date: 1854
- Total produced: 1
Specifications
- Configuration
  - Whyte: 2-2-2
- Gauge: 5 ft 3 in (1600 mm)
- Cylinders: 2
- Cylinder size: 7.87 in (200 mm) x [?] bore x stroke
Performance figures
- Maximum speed: 25 mph (40 km/h)
- Power output: 30.0 hp (22.4 kW)
Career
- First run: 9 September 1854

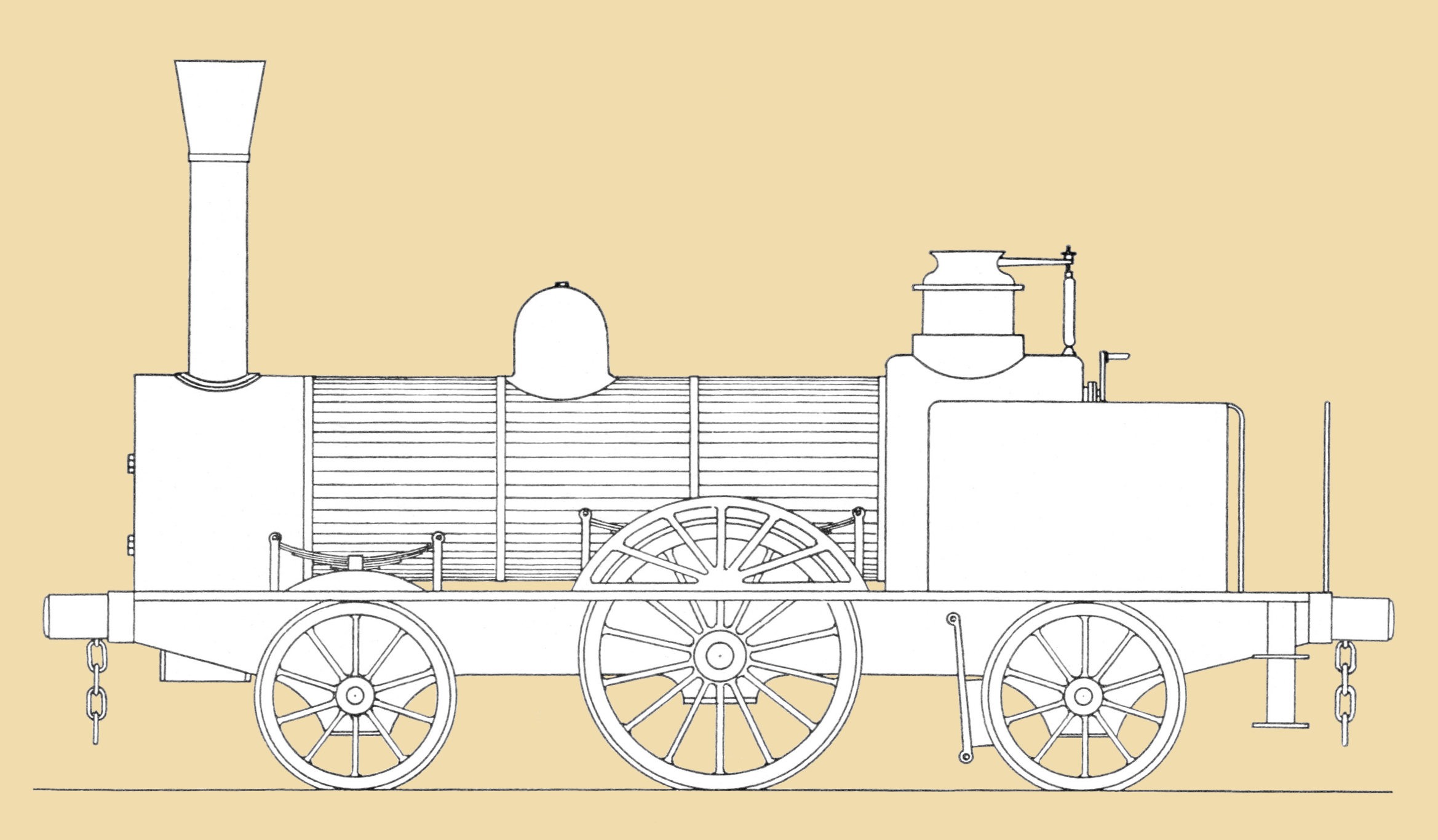
The locomotive was hurriedly built by Robertson, Martin & Smith in time for the inauguration of the Melbourne and Hobson's Bay railway when production of Robert Stephenson and Company's locomotives in the UK was delayed

Melbourne and Hobson's Bay Railway Company 2-2-2WT (1854) was the first locomotive operated after the inauguration of a public railway line in Australia. (Note: For the previous four months, before the line had opened, a makeshift, company-made 0-4-0 steam locomotive had hauled ballast wagons during the railway's construction.^{:104}) It had 7 7/8 in (200 mm) diameter cylinders and was capable of producing 30.0 horsepower (22.4 kilowatts), reaching 25 mph (40 km/h) and hauling 130 tonnes (130 long tons; 140 short tons).

== History ==
On 12 September 1854, the Melbourne and Hobson's Bay Railway Company inaugurated the first railway line to operate in Australia using steam locomotives. The line extended 4.2 kilometres (2.6 mi) from a Melbourne Terminal in Flinders Street and the beach at Sandridge (now Port Melbourne). Four locomotives had been ordered from Robert Stephenson and Company in Newcastle upon Tyne, England. However, manufacturing delays made it likely that the railway would be without a locomotive when it opened. The company took the bold step of tasking the Melbourne foundry company Robertson, Martin & Smith, which had never produced one, to construct within 10 weeks a 2-2-2 well-tank locomotive to the design of the railway's chief engineer. The builders achieved the deadline with three days to spare.

Robertson, Martin & Smith constructed the locomotive at Joseph Raleigh's disused boiling down works on the Saltwater River (now Maribyrnong River) near Footscray, with boiler fabrication being subcontracted to Langlands foundry. The locomotive's total cost was £2700.

Following its trials starting on 9 September 1854, the locomotive hauled the inaugural passenger train at the official opening on 12 September 1854. It continued to do so for three months before the Stephenson locomotives went into service. Its operation was interrupted by downtime on three occasions while broken crankshafts were repaired. In that period, the 0-4-0 locomotive that hauled ballast wagons during the railway's construction was utilised. However, on 1 December, services were ended "until further notice" for an unknown period. It is not known when the locomotive was taken out of service and scrapped.
