= Geelong and Melbourne Railway Company =

Former railway in Australia

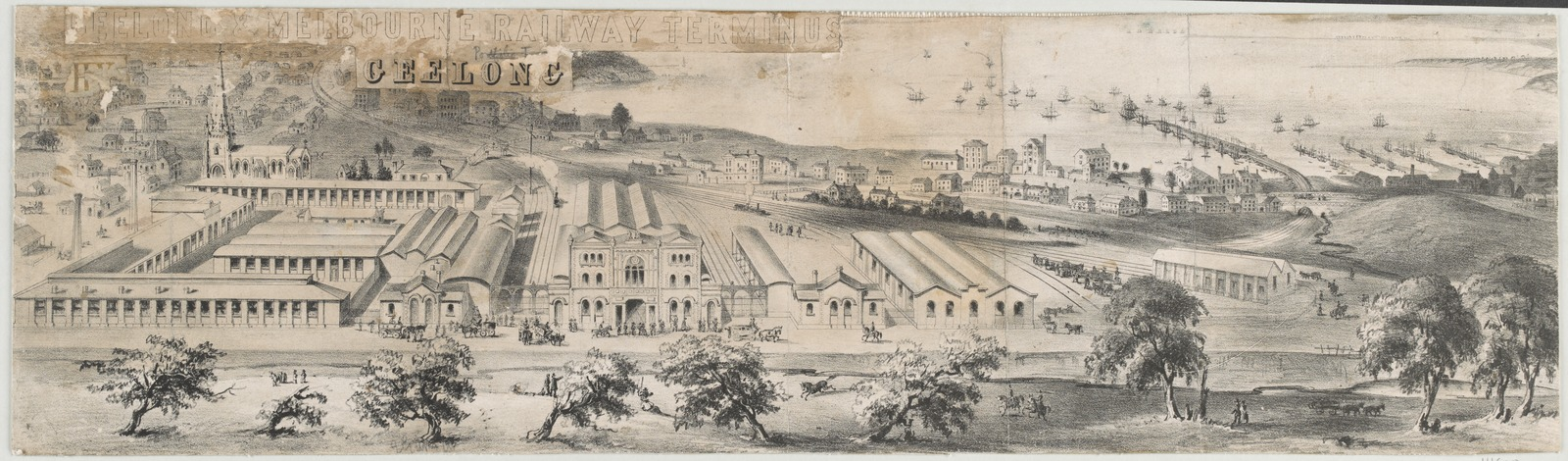
- Geelong Terminus

Overview
- Headquarters: Melbourne and Geelong
- Locale: Victoria
- Dates of operation: 1853–1860
- Successor: Ballarat and Melbourne

Technical
- Track gauge: Broad Gauge, 5ft. 3in.
- Electrification: 1952
- Length: 38.5 mile

The Geelong and Melbourne Railway Company was formed in 1852 Victoria, Australia, with the aim of constructing a railway between Geelong and Melbourne. The Geelong promoters emphasised the desirability of connecting the two most populous towns of the colony, particularly due to the rapid growth in population and trade as a result of the Victorian gold rush. They also mentioned the likelihood of connections with the proposed railways to Mount Alexander and Williamstown.

Alexander Thomson, a member of the Victorian Legislative Council, introduced and mentored a bill to incorporate the Geelong and Melbourne Railway Company. On 8 February 1853, the operation of Melbourne and Geelong Railway Company and Mount Alexander and Murray River Railway Company was approved by the Victoria Government. Thomson was one of the directors and presided at the first shareholder meeting.

Work began at the Geelong end in 1854 but progress was slow due to a labour shortage caused by the Victorian gold rush, so the Victorian government hired out 100 prisoners to the company at a daily rate of five shillings each. They were housed in prison hulks moored in Corio Bay. English engineer and surveyor, Edward Snell, undertook the survey and design of the line, including a station and extensive workshops at Geelong, and a number of bluestone and timber bridges.

Geelong and Melbourne Railway Company was one of the first private railway companies in Victoria. It was the first organization to offer the country line to connect the two major cities in the colony and supporting gold mining via cooperation with Mount Alexander and Murray River Railway Company. The company's establishment could be considered as a response to the fast-changing economy of Melbourne and Geelong during the 19th century. The company claimed to complete the line with low cost and rapid constructing time but the first service provided in Newport was 18 months behind schedule and constructing cost doubles the initial plan.

On 25 June 1857, the company opened the line from Geelong to a temporary terminus called Greenwich, on the Yarra River at Newport, where passengers had to transfer to a steam ferry for connection to Melbourne. In 1859, train services were extended through from Newport to Spencer Street station after the Victorian Railways opened the Williamstown railway. However, the company continued to operate at a loss, and in June 1860, was sold to the Government of Victoria for £800,000. The Geelong-Melbourne railway then became part of the network operated by the Victorian Railways, which undertook extensive repairs and refurbishment of the line and its infrastructure.

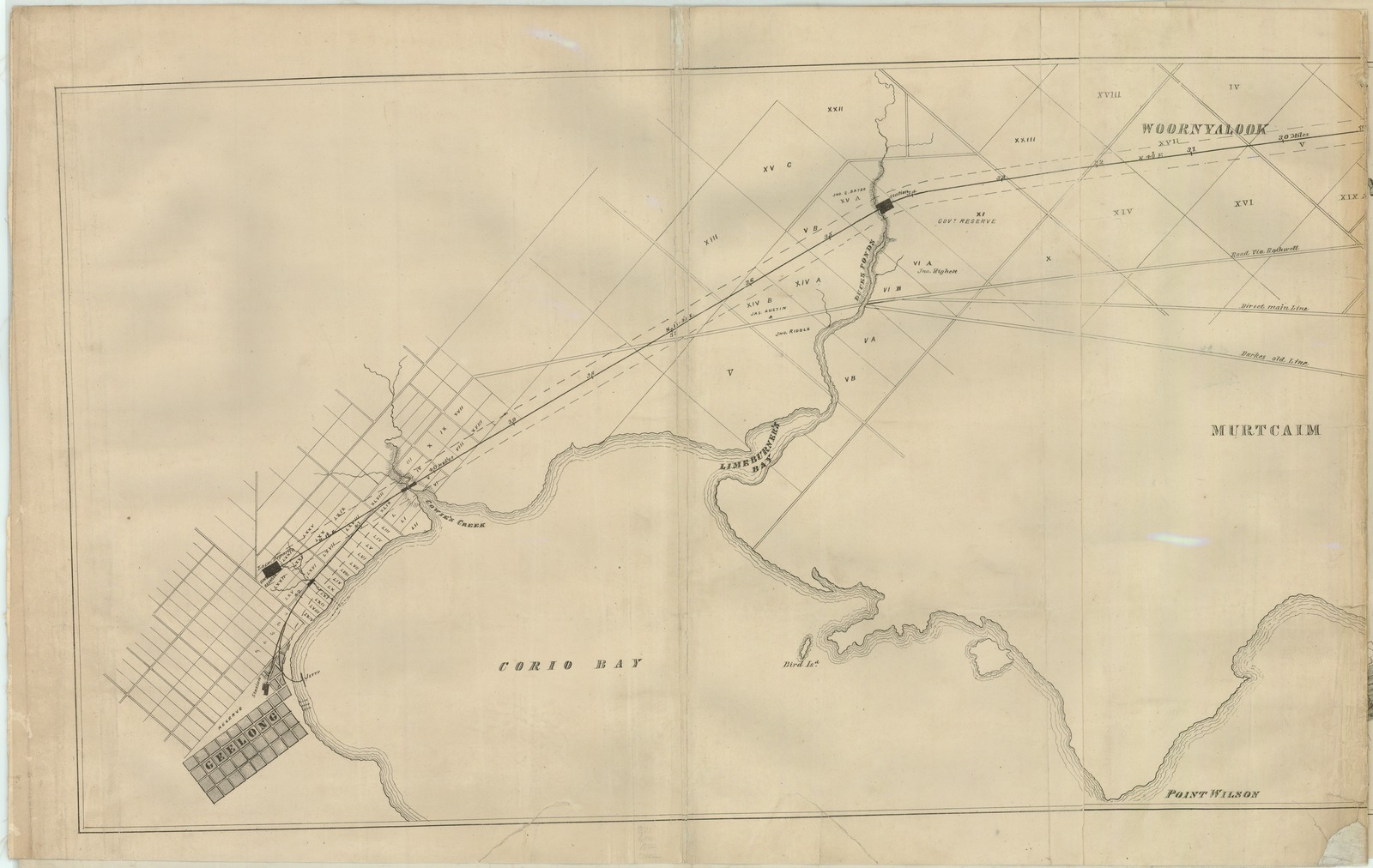
Geelong and Melbourne Railway Company Drawing 1

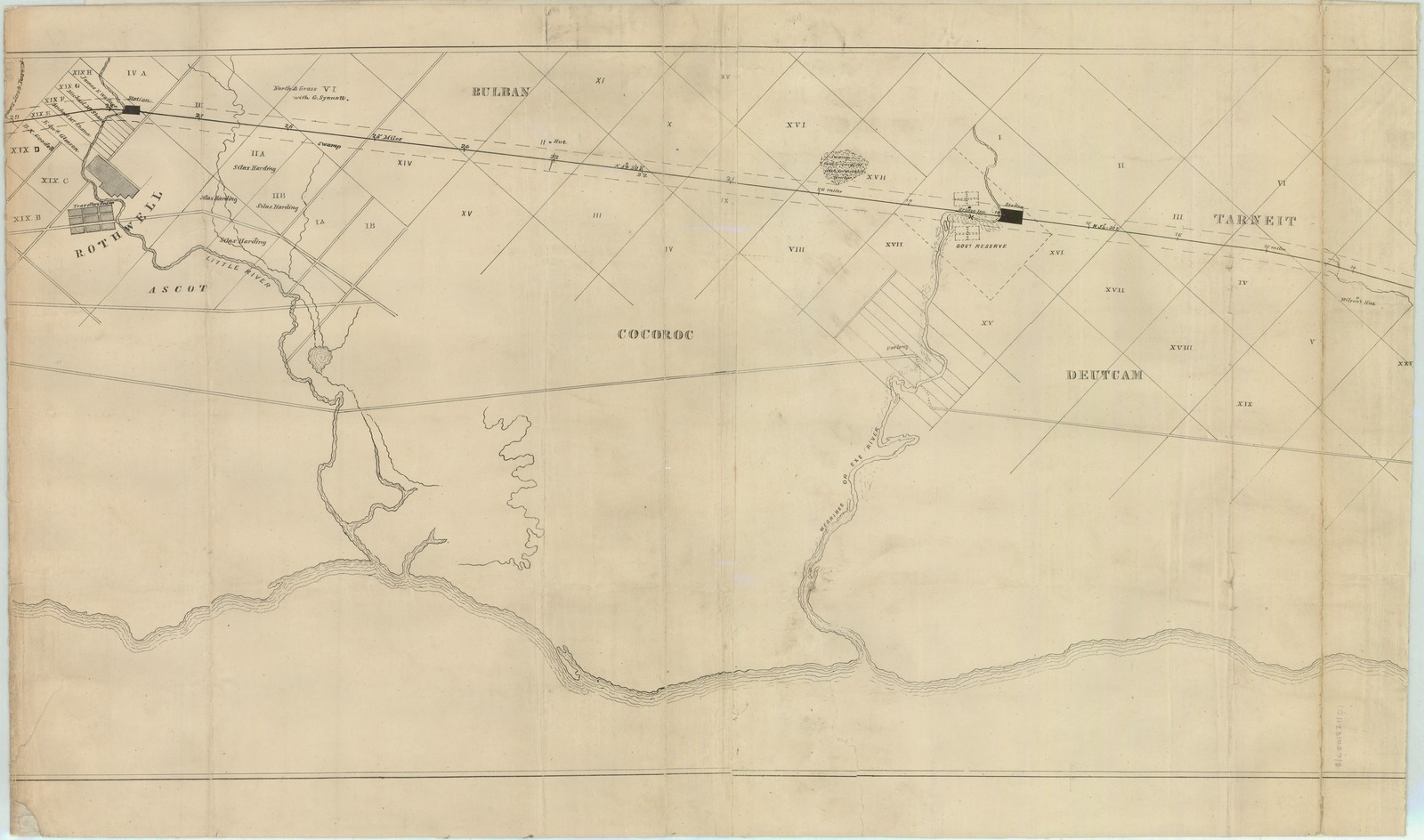
Geelong and Melbourne Railway Company Drawing 2

== History ==
The second half of the 19th century was the train era in the British colony since it witnessed the formation of multiple private railway companies. The railway industry was featured as one of the major developing factors with regards to the Australian economy and society. In January 1853, the government approved the Melbourne and Hobsons Bay Railway Company establishment. This company was the father of the first steam railway line in Melbourne which marked the revolution of transportation in Australia. However, this is a short urban line and there was still no country line to connect cities within the colony. In February 1853, two companies that offered country lines: Geelong and Melbourne Railway company and Mount Alexander and Murray River Railway Company were given approved for establishment.

The proposal for a wooden railway connecting Geelong and the Western Districts was approved for establishment in 1850. Before the construction of the 200-mile rail line, the company experienced bankruptcy. In 1853, a concrete proposal from Alexander Thompson introduced the idea of connecting to major cities Melbourne and Geelong had formed the foundation for the Geelong and Melbourne Railway company. The capital was 350,000 pounds in 17,500 shares of 20. The company's capital was also the initial planned project cost. The railway company was provided required land, fund, and a guaranteed dividend of 5% per year for its shares. Shareholders are mainly British in the UK or residence in the colony.

The company successfully delivered the first country line after approximately three years of construction. In 1856, the first service was provided between Geelong and Duck Ponds. The famous railway is the extended one to Little River, Werribee, and Greenwich. The company continued to operate a loss due to insufficient funds and labour shortage caused by the gold rush which were ongoing problems since the building process in 1854. In January 1859, O'Shanassy sent a request to House of Commons for allowance to purchase the railway company with 800,000 pounds. The author clarified that the excessive cost generated from inexperienced cost planning which cost the line twice to operate. In 1860, the company was under the Victoria government's control.

=== Half-yearly meeting ===
The company held two meetings per year and published two reports according to the meeting annually to announce the progress as well as incurred difficulties to stakeholders. The first meeting was conducted in the beginning of January and the second one was in the beginning of July.

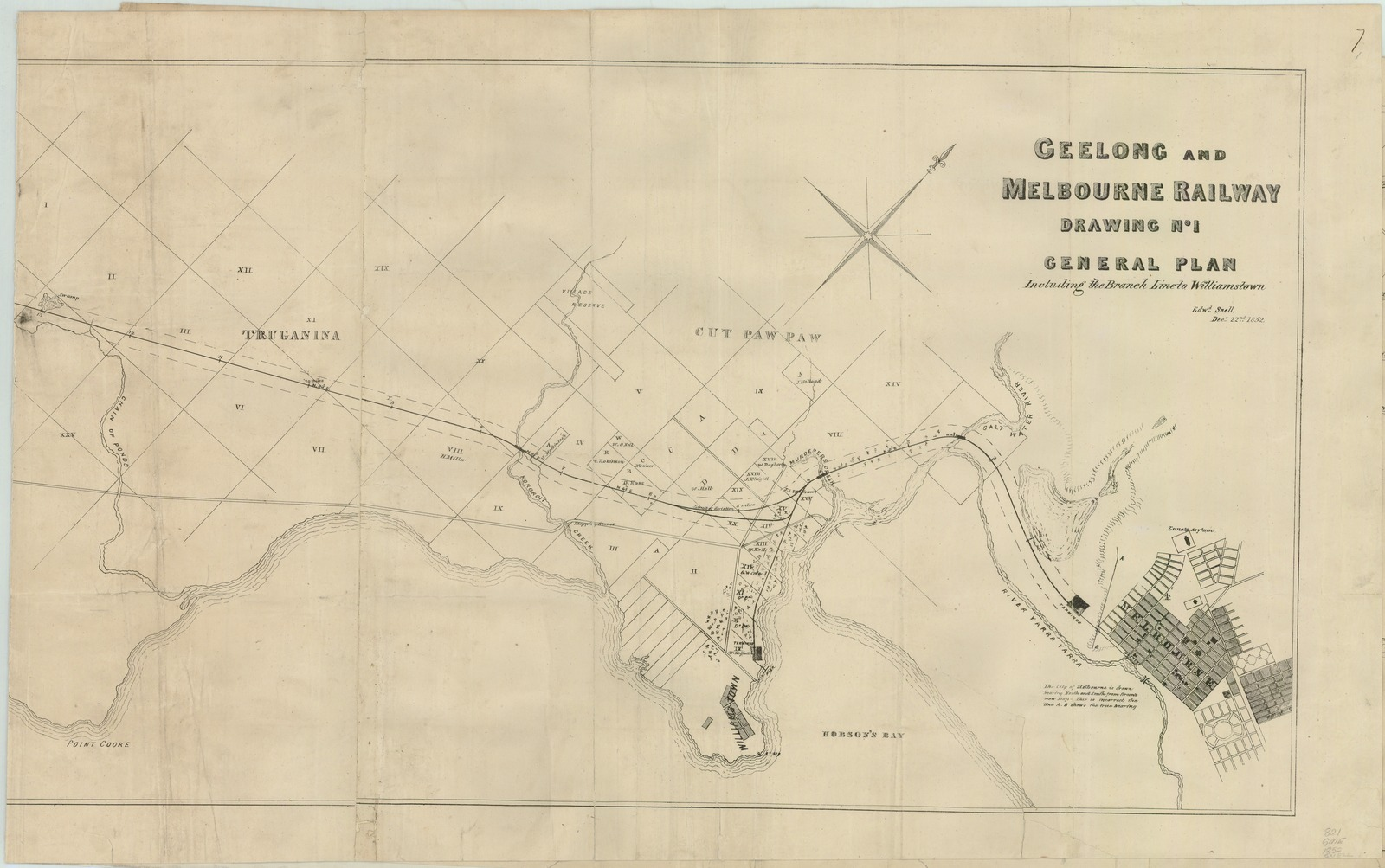
Geelong and Melbourne Railway Company Drawing 3

==== July 1854 ====
The second half-yearly meeting in 1854 was not as well attended as expected, which appeared to influence the Directors confidence. However, this meeting marked a milestone of critical achievements of the operation such as success in acquiring compulsory lands and full payment to share's interest which was 8%. Mr. Harrison, one of the shareholders, enquired the number of undisposed shares and The Presidents answered that approximately 7,500 unguaranteed shares were unalloted. Suspicion occurred to Mr. Harrison as he recalled having a strong impression that all shares had been disposed. Dr. Thompson, who was part of the Directors, explained that a significant number of investors did not believe that their investment would be as fruitful. So, 7,500 was the number of applications that Dr. Thompson predicted as unsuccessful based on what he had heard from the potential investors. The vice-president also stated that, after making guarantee for 10,000 shares, an addition of 3,000 applications had been received that year with a promise of guaranteed interested which the company was not capable of offering. Then Mr. Flink, one of the shareholders, proposed to put the shares in the British market as he believed that it would have a premium price without guarantee. The Directors were delightful to fully disposed all the shares but desired to maintain the equality of share class which meant that all shares should have similar benefits. Besides the number of allotted shares, the definition of guaranteed shares was explained by the Presidents due to misunderstanding. Mr. Harrison believed that this type of share applied to the first £200,000 first paid up so if he paid in time, he still counted as a guaranteed shareholder. However, the President responded that guaranteed share is applied to the first 10,000 shares with a certification that the minimum received interest, which was 5%, would not be influenced by any factor.

=== Initial purpose ===
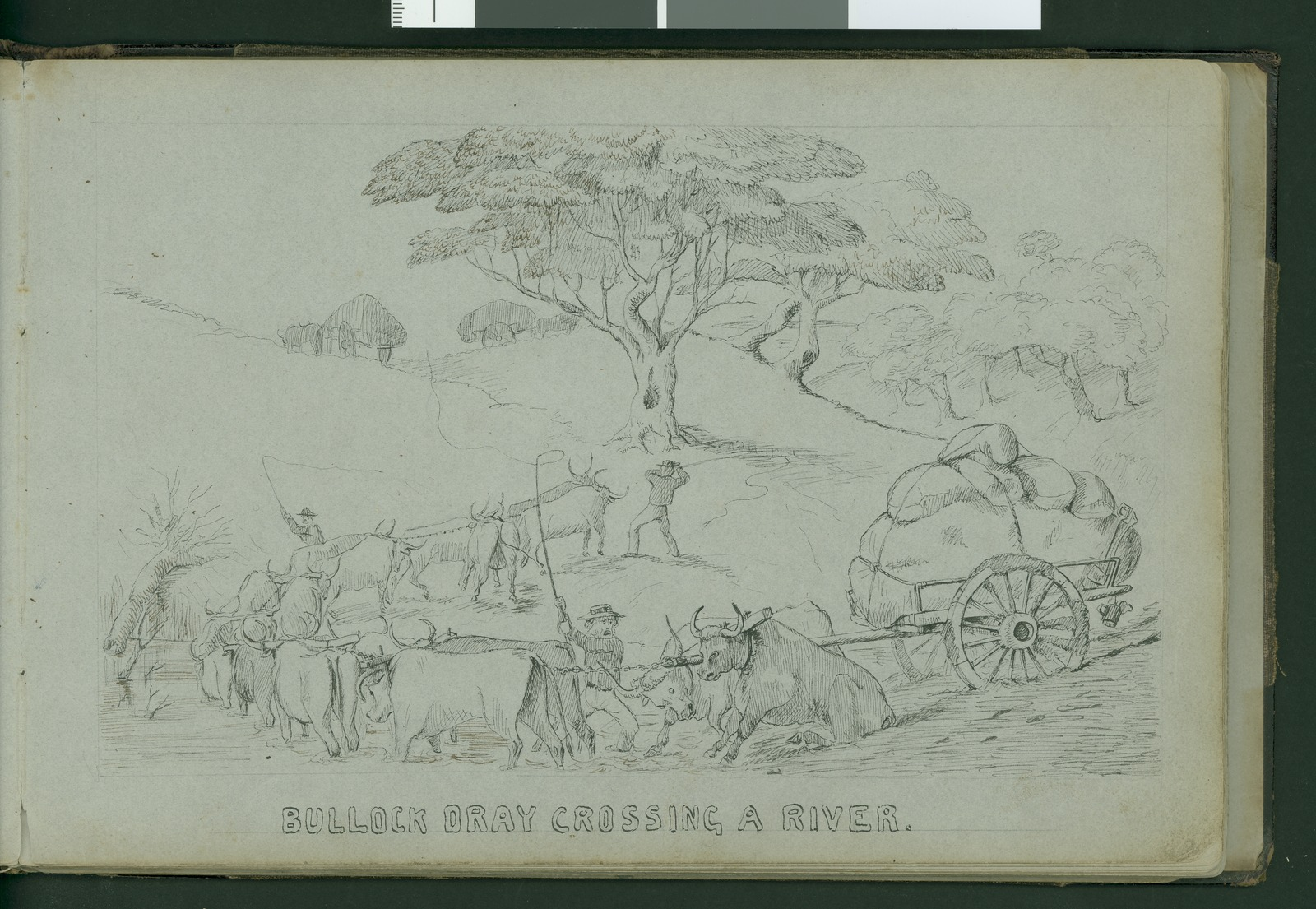
Bullock dray crossing a river

The company stated that the construction purpose is to connect the "two most populous town in the Colony of Victoria" and cooperate with another company building the junction to Williamstown. The railway line's owner declared that the majority of the colony's commerce was "centered within the town now proposed to be united". So, the accomplished reciprocity thanks to the completion of the line would enable citizens to exchange goods such as wool from Williamstown or Geelong to Melbourne with lower resources. The formation of the company or the railway can be determined as a response to the fast-changing economic circumstance. Geelong and Melbourne Railway Company stated that the line was an urgent need due to the rapidly increasing population rate in Melbourne (120%), Geelong (300%) in 5 years. The sum of the two towns population was 31,444. According to the company, existing transportation options were inadequate. The overland route was impassible due to the destruction of the Bridge over the Werribee. Another option was to transport goods via steamships but the company claimed that a railway was capable to transfer as many as 10 times of passengers compared to the capacity of three steamers. Moreover, the railway could help to reduce the overcrowded traffic in the ports by restraining delays.

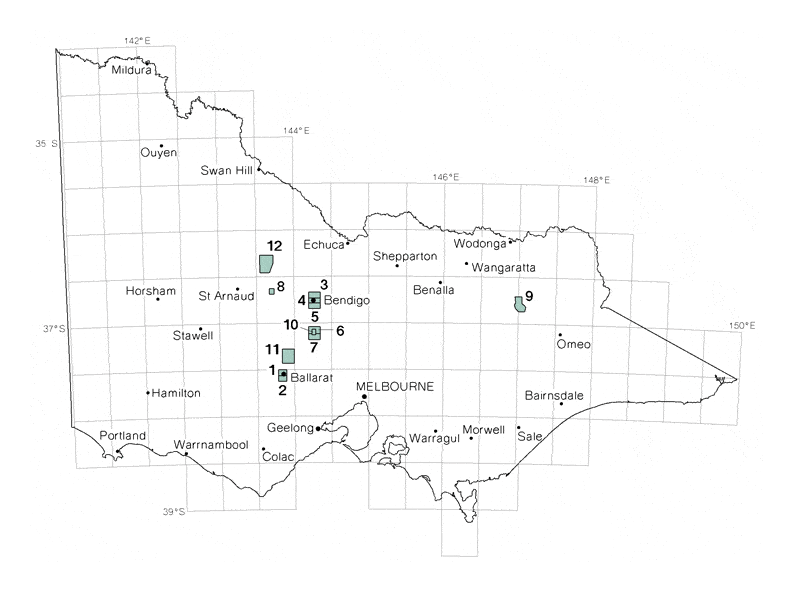
Map of Victorian Goldfields

The company announced that its service facilitated transportation between the Western goldfields in the colony to Melbourne. The company was born in the peak of the Victorian gold rush and the Geelong line has strategic geography since major gold mines were located in the north of the town with near distance. Plus, Geelong would also become a site where "ships entering Port Phillip Bay, unloading cargo and passengers which would be transported to the goldfields or to Melbourne".

== Construction ==
The original constructing plan was to connect Melbourne and Geelong from Melbourne Spencer Street to Williamstown. The junction to Williamstown was a deliverable of Mount Alexander and Murray River Railway Company's project. The partner company was insolvent in 1856. Thus, an adjusted line was built so the train could temporarily terminate at Greenwich near Newport then customers transited to a steamer to travel to Melbourne or Sandridge Railway Pier.

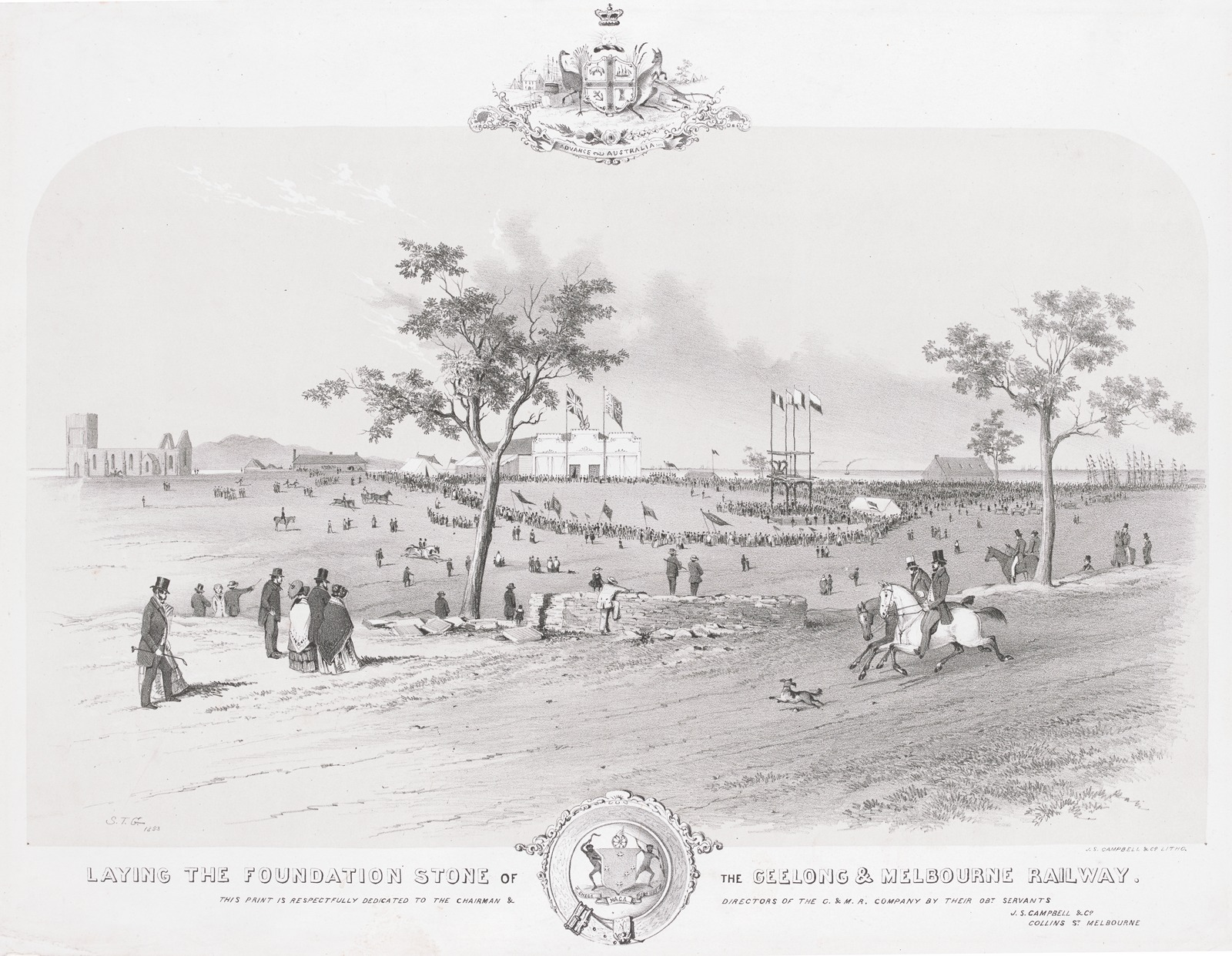
Laying the foundation stone of the Geelong & Melbourne Railway

In September 1853, Joseph La Trobe who was the Lieutenant-Governor of the colony marked the railway construction by turning on the first sod at Geelong station. The construction process had not started until early 1854 but the project experienced a labour shortage due to the gold rushes hype at the current time. The chairman announced in the second meeting of 1854 that the majority of required land from the terminus, Geelong station, to Cowies Creek station (now Corio station) had been purchased or arranged with minimal difficulties. Also, in the report, the chairman wrote that the Victoria government was generous and engaging as two hulks were placed at Cowies Creek (now Corio Bay) to proceed the construction to Duck Ponds.

The government employed 100 prisoners from the prison ship moored off Limeburners Point as labour to build the railway line. However, the company continuously experienced shortages in resources due to the high cost and long shipping time of locomotives imported from England. In September 1855, the company reported to have received a shipment of two carriages, wagons and other stocks. Also, two locomotives from London sent in July were still expecting daily. However, first Australia made locomotive was also prepared for usage. The Ariel locomotive built in Geelong in 1856 was in use until the 1890s.

Also in late 1855, four miles of the permanent line from Cowies Creek station to Geelong station was completed and the accommodation at the terminus were almost finished the building process. On the southern side of the line, ten miles of earthwork was completed, which was from Geelong station and Duck Ponds, and ready for trial. In the last quarter of 1856, the railway company operated trial passenger train running between Geelong and Duck Ponds (now Lara) stations. Duck Ponds was also the transition station from the Geelong line to Williamstown where the line would continue via the junction. Mount Alexander and Murray River Railway Company by that time has been acquired by the colony government and the contractors that were responsible for the Williamstown junction's project was still in the negotiating process due to the labour shortages. Also, the partnered company announced that they would confine their construction to the six miles of the Melbourne and Williamstown portion and approximately 70 miles from Melbourne to Alexander which remained untouched.

Then the service extended to Little River in January 1857. The 38.5-mile railway line to Newport completed on 8 June 1857 and started offering service since 25 June 1867.

== Extension ==
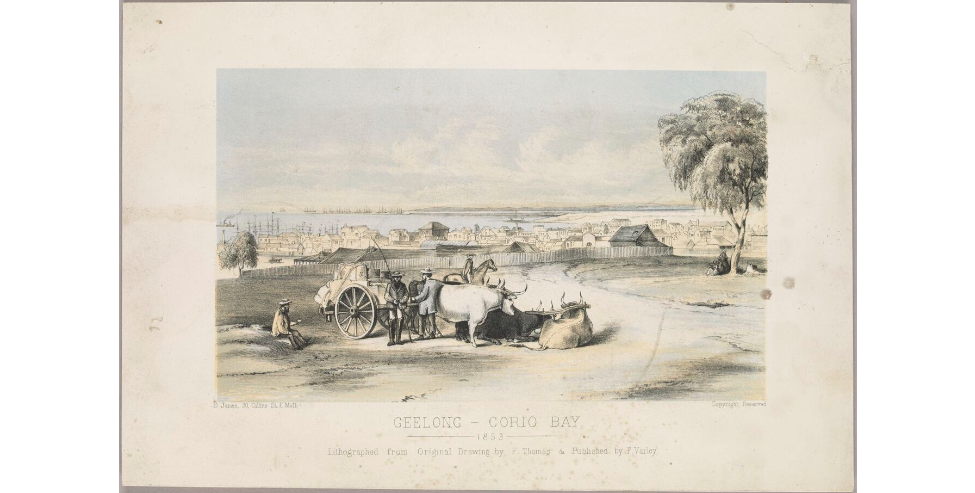
Corio Bay, Geelong in 1853

The next phase of the project is to extend the new line to Ballarat in 1858. The line was opened for service in April 1862. In 1855, a newspaper commented that neither the colony or the investors would receive full advantages of the line construction unless the line was extended to Ballarat and other western gold-fields to increase reciprocity. The alluded line from Geelong to Ballarat would significantly enhance the company's value. The extended project was proposed in the previous session of Legistrative Council in September with high hopes. However, the press also cited that the company's Executive was "folly" to propose for the extension due to the fact that the construction for the permanent line was behind schedule and the company was not ready for the operation. Therefore, a strong effort from the company to extend the line would be required unless the colony government proceed the work via providing funds to resuscitate or amalgamating to other railway companies such as Alexander and Murray River or Melbourne and Sandridge due to delays in constructing or traffic intensity respectively. The amalgamation was considered as a good option since it would bring greater returned values for shareholders contained better mutual benefits for the colony.

After that, the line was planned to extend south-west to Winchelsea by "building a line running along the Corio Bay waterfront towards Limeburners Point, where the line would then cross the hill and run down to the Barwon River". The proposal was rejected and replaced by tunnels to transport passengers across the hill.

== Acquisition ==
In 1859, Sir C.Fortescue sent a proposal to the House of Commons and the Queen to purchase the Geelong and Melbourne Railway Company due to losses. The author suggested to urgently purchase the company to prevent potential loss in the future for British shareholders and reduce the government expenditure. In earlier of the same year, the chief secretary Hon. John O’Shanassy also gave as a speech in a meeting at the House requesting for purchase of the line.

== Rolling stock ==
=== Locomotives ===
Class	Wheel arrangement	Fleet number(s)	Manufacturer Serial numbers	Year introduced	Total	Total preserved	Year(s) withdrawn	Comments
G&MR 0-4-0T || 0-4-0VBT	Ariel	Walker & Munro, Geelong	1855	1	0	1860	To Victorian Railways	
G&MR 2-2-2WT	2-2-2WT	Oberon, Sirocco, Titania, Typhoon	Robert Stephenson & Co. (2); 1006, 1007; Stothert & Slaughter, Bristol (2)	1856	4	0	1860	All to Victorian Railways
G&MR 2-4-0WT	2-4-0WT	Cyclone, Hurricane	R&W Hawthorn; 925, 926	1857	2	0	1860	All to Victorian Railways
G&MR 0-6-0WT	0-6-0WT	Goliath, Hercules, Samson, Tubal-Cain	R&W Hawthorn; 927-930	1857	4	0	1858-1860	2 to Victorian Railways; 1 to Melbourne & Suburban Railway; 1 to Cornish & Bruce

Companies
First	Geelong and Melbourne Railway Company; 8 February 1853 – 3 September 1860	Succeeded by Victorian Railways
