= Williamstown Workshops =

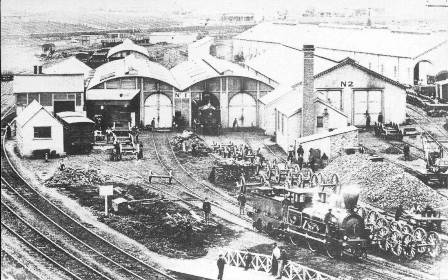
The workshops in 1870

The Williamstown Workshops was the first railway workshop operated by the Victorian Railways, located in the Melbourne inner western suburb of Williamstown.

== History ==
The workshops opened in 1858 in four or five temporary buildings at Point Gellibrand, for the assembly of engines and carriages imported from England for the first government owned railways in the state. Other buildings were soon added, with seven locomotives built there, the first being number 100, a 2-4-0 passenger engine completed in 1872. As early as 1860 plans were made for new workshops but nothing came of these, until the 1880s when railway management described the workshops as inadequate and moves were made for new workshops at Newport. By 1889 the new shops were open, and Williamstown was closed.
