= Locomotives of the Somerset and Dorset Joint Railway =

The locomotives of the Somerset and Dorset Joint Railway can be broken down into four eras:

- The period of independence up to 1874;
- The period of joint ownership when Samuel Waite Johnson was Locomotive Superintendent for the Midland Railway (1875–1906);
- The period when Henry Fowler was Locomotive Superintendent of the Midland Railway, and later Chief Mechanical Engineer of its successor, the London, Midland and Scottish Railway (1907–1929);
- The period after 1930 when the locomotives had been absorbed into the stock of the LMS (1930–1966).

The railway had a locomotive, carriage and wagon works at Highbridge, Somerset, but this closed in 1930. Note that the locomotive history of the Somerset and Dorset Joint Railway is complicated by the many reboilerings, rebuildings, and renumberings, not all of which are captured in the table.

== Early era ==
| Group | Wheel arrangement | Manufacturer | Year | Quantity | S&D Nos. | Year(s) withdrawn | Comments |
|---|---|---|---|---|---|---|---|
Early era
| S&DR George England 2-4-0 | 2-4-0 | George England and Co. | 1861 | 7 | 1–7 | 1874–1925 | |
| S&DR George England 2-4-0T | 2-4-0T | George England & Co. | 1861 | 1 | 8 | 1928 | |
| S&DR George England 2-4-0 | 2-4-0 | George England and Co. | 1863 | 2 | 9–10 | 1878 | Sold to Midland Railway. |
| S&DR George England 2-4-0T | 2-4-0T | George England & Co. | 1863 | 1 | 11 | 1870 | Sold to the Admiralty. |
| S&DR George England 2-4-0 | 2-4-0 | George England and Co. | 1864 | 4 | 12–15 | 1878 | Sold to London and South Western Railway (3) and MR (1). |
| | 2-4-0T | Edward Bury | 1842 | 1 | 16 | c. 1874 | Second hand locomotive acquired from director George Reed in 1865. |
| S&DR Cudworth 2-4-0 | 2-4-0 | George England & Co. | 1865 | 2 | 17–18 | 1897 | Ordered by the South Eastern Railway, but refused due to late delivery. |
| S&DR Vulcan Foundry 2-4-0 | 2-4-0 | Vulcan Foundry | 1866 | 2 (+4) | 19-20 (+21–24) | 1913–14 | Renumbered 15–16. Six had been ordered, but could only pay for two, other four sold to Imperial Railways in Alsace-Lorraine as their class A 4. |
| S&DR John Fowler 0-6-0 | 0-6-0 | John Fowler & Co. | 1874 | 6 | 19–24 | 1928 | |
| S&DJR Fox, Walker 0-6-0ST | 0-6-0ST | Fox, Walker & Co. | 1874 | 5 | 1–5 | 1928–1934 | LMS 1500–1504. |
| S&DJR Fox, Walker 0-6-0ST | 0-6-0ST | Fox, Walker & Co. | 1876 | 4 | 6–9 | 1928–1934 | LMS 1505–1507. |

== Johnson era ==
| Group | Wheel arrangement | Manufacturer | Year | Quantity | S&D Nos. | Year(s) withdrawn | Comments |
|---|---|---|---|---|---|---|---|
Johnson era
| S&DJR 'Bobby Dazzler' tank locomotives | 0-4-0ST | Slaughter, Grüning & Co. | 1852 | 1 | 5 | 1895 | Acquired 1882; renumbered 45A in 1891. |
| S&DJR 'Bobby Dazzler' tank locomotives | 0-4-2ST | Highbridge Works | 1885 | 1 | 25A | 1929 | |
| S&DJR 'Bobby Dazzler' tank locomotives | 0-4-0ST | Highbridge Works | 1895 | 2 | 45A, 26A | 1929–30 | |
| S&DJR Avonside 0-4-4T | 0-4-4T | Avonside Engine Co. | 1877 | 9 | 10–14, 29–32 | 1930–32 | LMS 1200–1207. |
| S&DJR Vulcan Foundry 0-4-4T | 0-4-4T | Vulcan Foundry | 1883 | 3 | 52–53, 55 | 1930–46 | LMS 1230–1232. |
| Midland Railway 1532 Class | 0-4-4T | Derby Works | 1884 | 1 | 54 | 1931 | Ex MR 1305, acquired 1921; to LMS 1305 |
| S&DJR 0-6-0 | 0-6-0 | Neilson & Co. | 1878 | 6 | 33–38 | 1914–22 | Nicknamed "Scotties". |
| S&DJR 0-6-0 | 0-6-0 | Vulcan Foundry | 1879 | 6 | 39–44 | 1914–32 | Renumbered 67–69 in 1928. LMS 2886–2888. |
| S&DJR 0-6-0 | 0-6-0 | Vulcan Foundry | 1881 | 4 | 25–28 | 1914–28 | |
| S&DJR 0-6-0 | 0-6-0 | Vulcan Foundry | 1883 | 6 | 46–51 | 1925–32 | Renumbered 70/71/51 in 1928. LMS 2885/89/90. |
| S&DJR 0-6-0 | 0-6-0 | Vulcan Foundry | 1890 | 6 | 56–61 | 1928–32 | Renumbered 33–38 in 1922. LMS 2880–2884. |
| Midland Railway Johnson 0-6-0 | 0-6-0 | Derby Works | 1896 | 5 | 62–66 | 1947–61 | Nicknamed "Bulldogs". LMS 3194, 3198, 3201, 3204, 3211. |
| Midland Railway Johnson 0-6-0 | 0-6-0 | Neilson, Reid & Co. | 1902 | 5 | 72–76 | 1952–62 | Delivered in Midland Red lettered "S&DJR". Nicknamed "Bulldogs". LMS 3216, 3218, 3228, 3248, 3260. |
| S&DJR 4-4-0 | 4-4-0 | Derby Works | 1891 | 4 | 15–18 | 1928–1931 | LMS 301–302. |
| S&DJR 4-4-0 | 4-4-0 | Derby Works | 1896–97 | 4 | 67, 68, 14, 45 | 1920–1932 | LMS 300, 303. |
| S&DJR 4-4-0 | 4-4-0 | Derby Works | 1903 | 3 | 69–71 | 1914–21 | Renewed (see below). |
| S&DJR 4-4-0 | 4-4-0 | Derby Works | 1908 | 2 | 77–78 | 1931–38 | LMS 320–321. |

== Fowler era ==
| Group | Wheel arrangement | Manufacturer | Year | Quantity | S&D Nos. | Year(s) withdrawn | Comments |
|---|---|---|---|---|---|---|---|
Fowler era
| Midland Railway 483 Class | 4-4-0 | Derby Works | 1914 | 2 | 70–71 | 1953–56 | Renumbered 39–40; LMS 322–323. |
| Midland Railway 483 Class | 4-4-0 | Derby Works | 1921 | 3 | 67–69 | 1951–56 | Renumbered 41–43; LMS 324–326. |
| S&DJR 7F 2-8-0 | 2-8-0 | Derby Works | 1914 | 6 | 80–85 | 1959–1962 | LMS 9670–9675, later 13800–13805. |
| S&DJR 7F 2-8-0 | 2-8-0 | Robert Stephenson & Co. | 1925 | 5 | 86–90 | 1963–64 | LMS 9676–9680, later 13806–13810. |
| Midland Railway 3835 Class | 0-6-0 | Armstrong Whitworth | 1922 | 5 | 57–61 | 1962–1965 | Nicknamed "Armstrongs" LMS 4557–4561. |
| LMS Class 2P 4-4-0 | 4-4-0 | Derby Works | 1928 | 3 | 44–46 | 1959–1961 | ex-LMS 575, 576, 580; to LMS 633–635. |
| LMS Fowler Class 3F | 0-6-0T | W. G. Bagnall | 1929 | 7 | 19–25 | 1959–67 | LMS 7150–7156, later 7310–7316. |
| S&DJR Sentinels | 0-4-0VBT | Sentinel Waggon Works | 1929 | 2 | 101–102 | 1959–61 | LMS 7190–7191. |
