= Plowden railway station =

Former railway station in England

Plowden
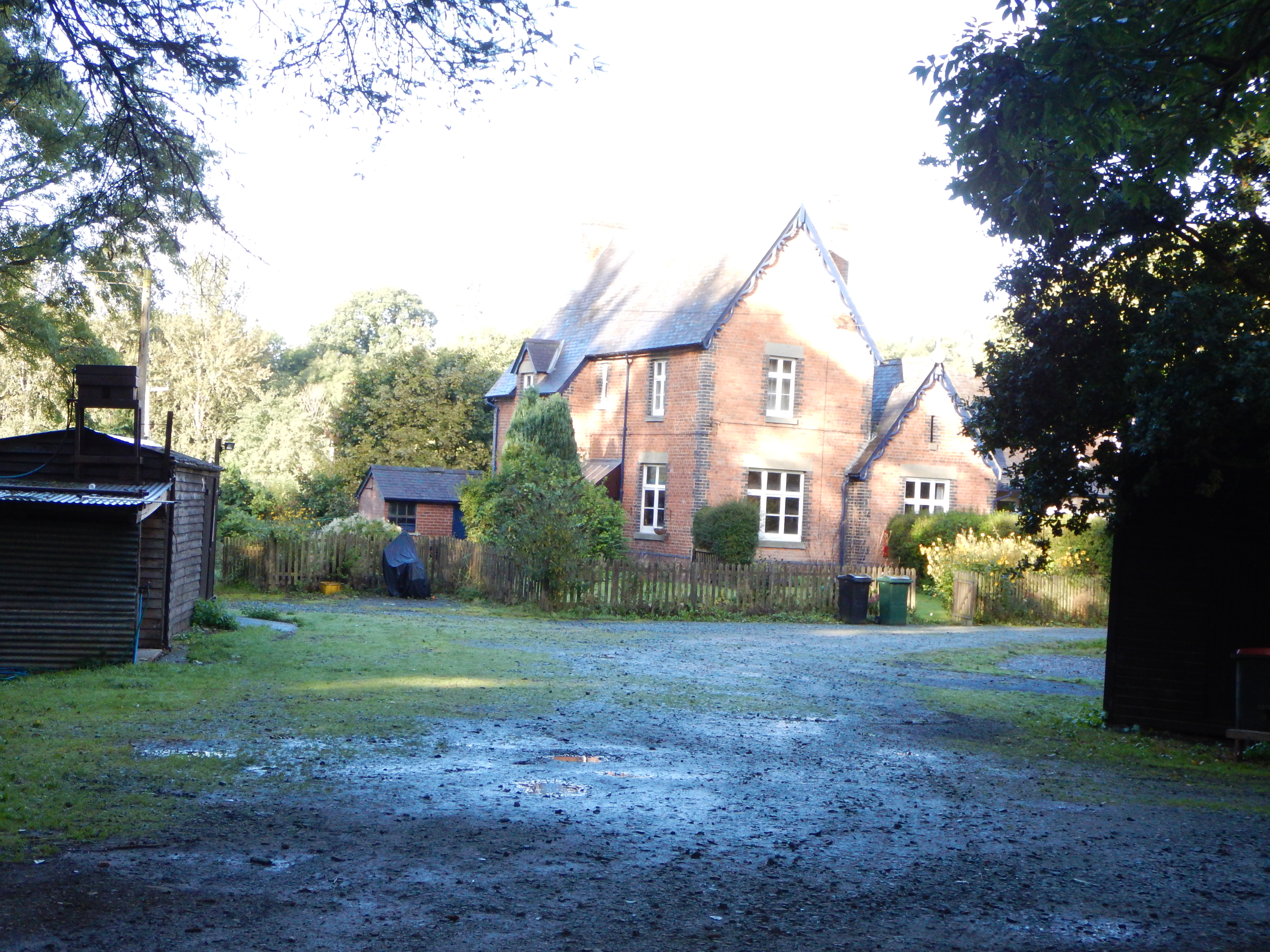
- The station building, now a private residence

General information
- Location: Plowden, Shropshire; England
- Coordinates: 52.4830°N 2.9122°W
- Grid reference: SO382875
- Platforms: 1

Other information
- Status: Disused

History
- Original company: Bishops Castle Railway
- Pre-grouping: Bishops Castle Railway
- Post-grouping: Bishops Castle Railway

Key dates
- February 1866: Opened
- 20 April 1935: Closed
Location

Plowden railway station was a station in Plowden, Shropshire, England. The station was opened in February 1866 and closed on 20 April 1935.

== See also ==
- Listed buildings in Lydbury North

Preceding station	Disused railways	Following station
Eaton; Line and station closed	Bishops Castle Railway	Horderley; Line and station closed
