= S&DR George England 2-4-0 =

Steam locomotive

S&DR George England 2-4-0 Dimensions for nos. 1-7 (others may differ)
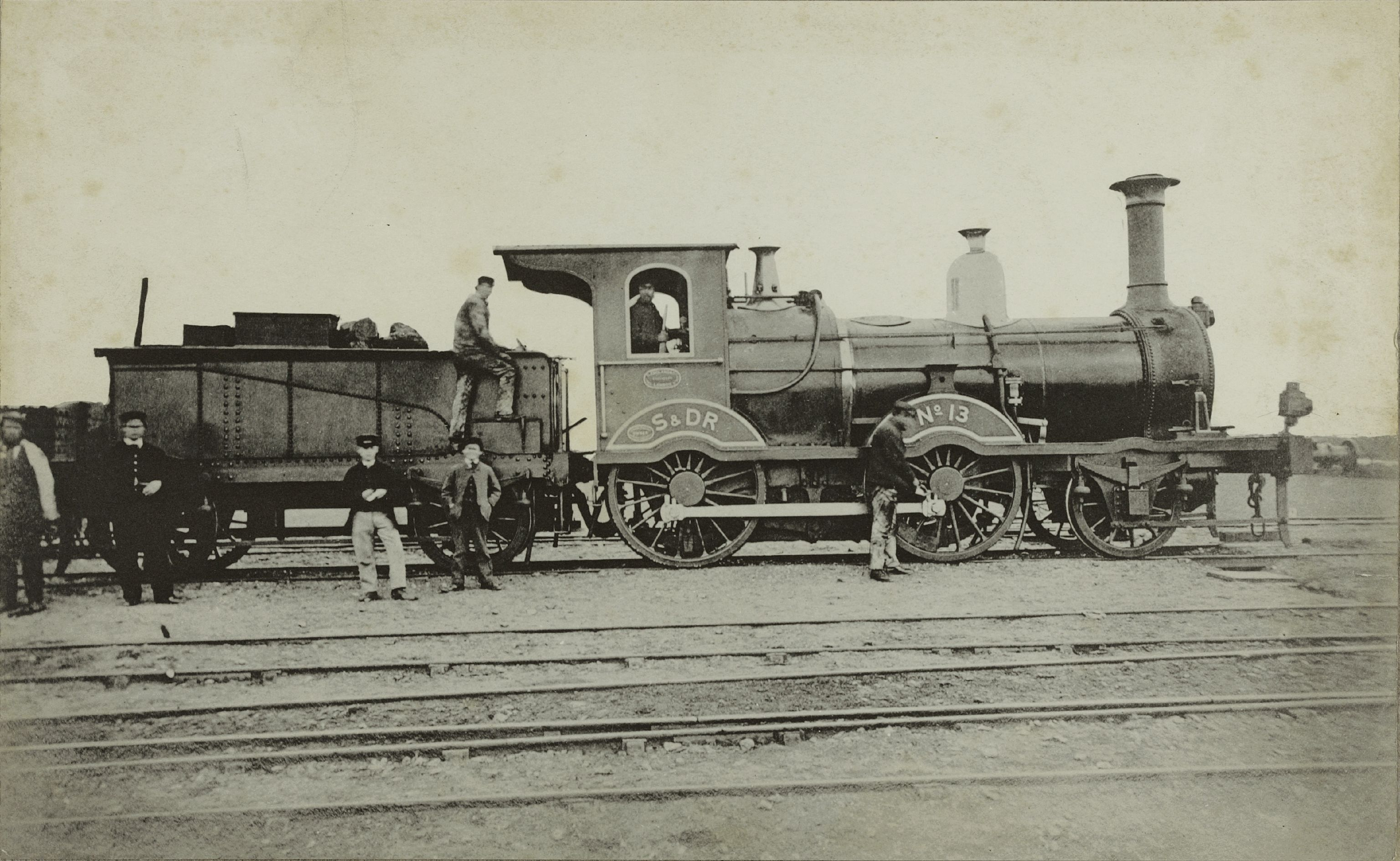
Type and origin
- Power type: Steam
- Builder: George England
- Build date: 1861, 1863-1865
- Total produced: 7
Specifications
- Configuration
  - Whyte: 2-4-0
- Gauge: 4 ft 8 1/2 in (1,435 mm)
- Driver dia.: 5 ft 0 in (1,520 mm)
- Boiler pressure: 115 psi (790 kPa)
- Heating surface: 849 ft^{2} (78.9 m^{2})
- Cylinders: Two, inside
- Cylinder size: 15 in × 18 in (380 mm × 460 mm)
Career
- Operators: Somerset and Dorset Railway

The S&DR George England 2-4-0 were 2-4-0 steam locomotives built by George England for the Somerset and Dorset Railway (S&DR) and its predecessor, the Somerset Central Railway (SCR). There were frequent re-numberings, which explains the presence of two number 11s.

== Tender engines built 1861-1864 ==
Number	Build date	Disposal	Notes
1	1861	to Fox, Walker 1874	1,2
2	1861	?	1
3	1861	to Fox, Walker 1874	1,2
4	1861	to Fox, Walker 1874	1,2
5	1861	to Fox, Walker 1874	1,2
6	1861	?	1
7	1861	?	1
9	1863	sold 1878	
10	1863	sold 1878	
11	1864	sold 1878	
12	1864	sold 1878	
13	1864	sold 1878	
14	1864	sold 1878	

Notes

1. Built for Somerset Central Railway
2. Engines sent to Fox, Walker and Company in 1874 were in part-exchange for new 0-6-0ST locomotives

Two of the engines sent to Fox, Walker were re-sold to the Bishops Castle Railway.

== Tank engines built 1861 ==
Number	Build date	Disposal	Notes
8	1861	scrapped 1928	re-built several times
11	1861	to L&SWR c.1871	acquired by S&DR 1863

== Tender engines built 1865 ==
These were double-framed engines built to the design of James Cudworth for the South Eastern Railway (SER). By the time they arrived, the SER no longer required them, so they were sold to the S&DR instead.

Number	Build date	Disposal	Notes
17	1865	scrapped 1/1897	
18	1865	scrapped 1/1897	

== See also ==
- Locomotives of the Somerset and Dorset Joint Railway
