= Stretford Bridge Junction Halt railway station =

Former railway station in England

Stretford Bridge Junction Halt
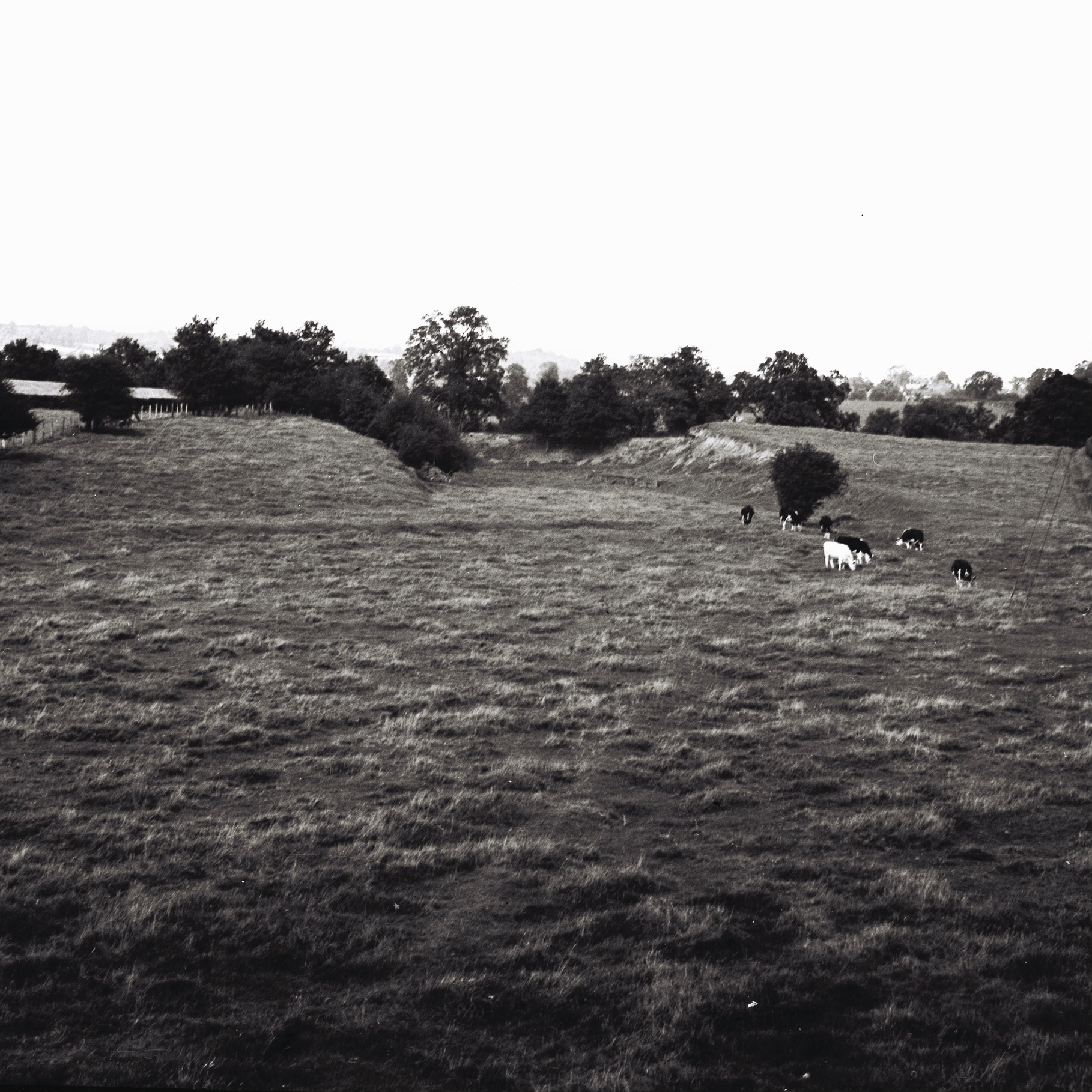
- The site of Stretford Bridge Halt station in the 1950s

General information
- Location: Cheney Longville, Shropshire; England
- Coordinates: 52.4555°N 2.8395°W
- Grid reference: SO430847
- Platforms: 1

Other information
- Status: Disused

History
- Original company: Bishops Castle Railway
- Pre-grouping: Bishops Castle Railway
- Post-grouping: Bishops Castle Railway

Key dates
- May 1890: Opened
- 20 April 1935: Closed
Location

Stretford Bridge Junction Halt railway station was a station in Cheney Longville, Shropshire, England. The station was opened in May 1890 and closed on 20 April 1935.

Preceding station	Disused railways	Following station
Horderley; Line and station closed	Bishops Castle Railway	Craven Arms; Line and station open
