= Bishop's Castle railway station =

Disused railway station in Shropshire, England

Bishop's Castle
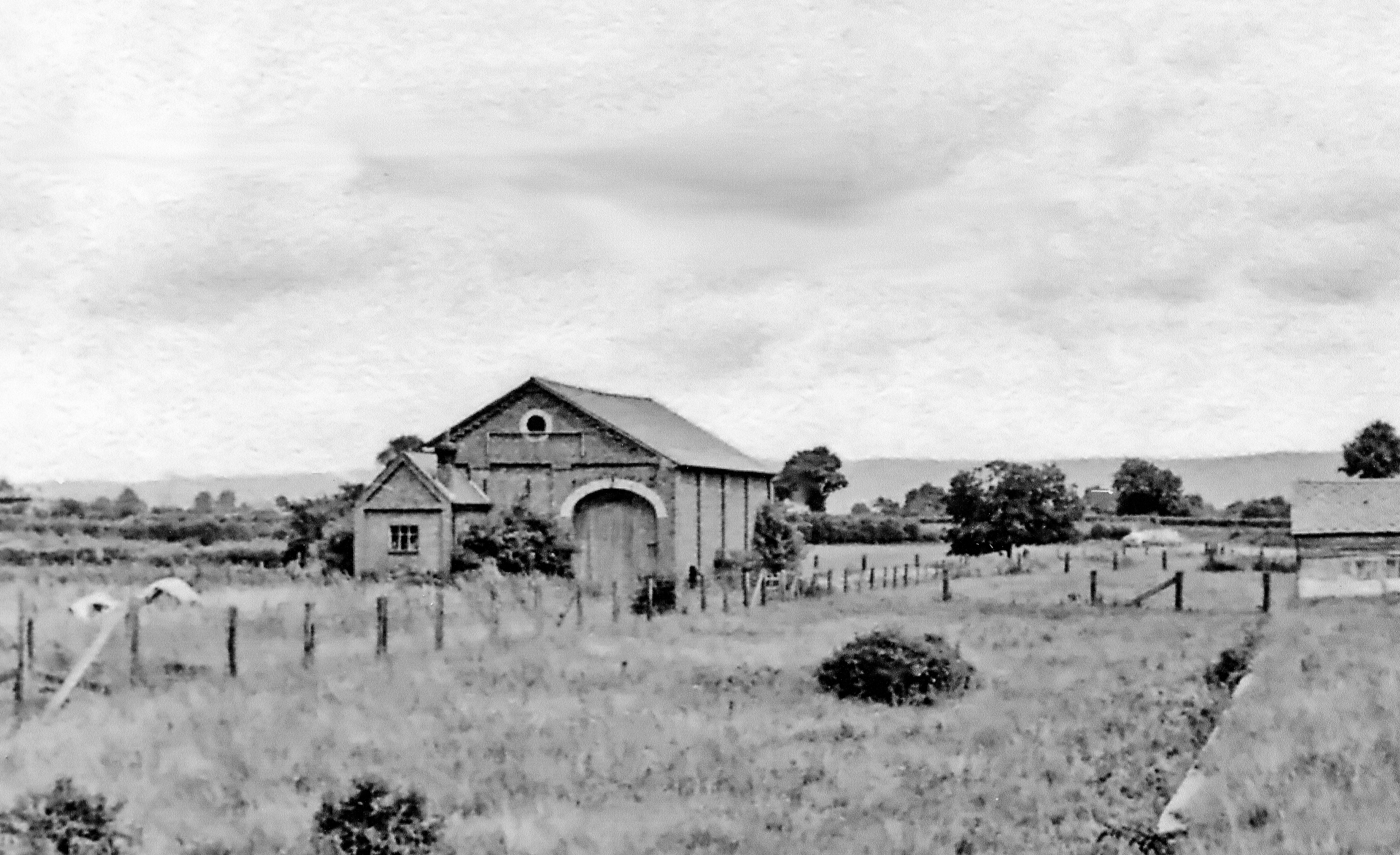
- The remains of Bishop's Castle station and goods yard in 1951

General information
- Location: Bishop's Castle, Shropshire; England
- Coordinates: 52.4917°N 2.9954°W
- Grid reference: SO324886
- Platforms: 1

Other information
- Status: Disused

History
- Original company: Bishops Castle Railway
- Pre-grouping: Bishops Castle Railway
- Post-grouping: Bishops Castle Railway

Key dates
- 1 February 1866: Opened
- 20 April 1935: Closed
Location

Bishop's Castle railway station was a station in Bishop's Castle, Shropshire, England. The station was opened on 1 February 1866 and closed on 20 April 1935.

Preceding station	Disused railways	Following station
Terminus	Bishops Castle Railway	Lydham Heath; Line and station closed
