= Listed buildings in Lydbury North =

Lydbury North is a civil parish in Shropshire, England. It contains 57 listed buildings that are recorded in the National Heritage List for England. Of these, one is listed at Grade I, the highest of the three grades, three are at Grade II*, the middle grade, and the others are at Grade II, the lowest grade. The parish contains the villages of Lydbury North and Brockton, and smaller settlements including Plowden, but is otherwise rural. Most of the listed buildings are houses and cottages, farmhouses and farm buildings, a high proportion of which are timber framed or have timber frame cores, and some contain cruck trusses. The other listed buildings include a church, a tomb in the churchyard, country houses and associated structures, a public house, a former railway station and stationmaster's house, a water mill, and seven milestones.

== Key ==
Grade	Criteria
I	Buildings of exceptional interest, sometimes considered to be internationally important
II*	Particularly important buildings of more than special interest
II	Buildings of national importance and special interest

== Buildings ==
Name and location	Photograph	Date	Notes	Grade
St Michael's Church; 52.46835°N 2.95511°W		Early 12th century	The church was extended through the later centuries, and was restored by J. T. Micklethwaite in 1901–02 and in 1908. It is built in limestone, partly pebbledashed, with dressings in red sandstone, and stone-slate roofs. The church has a cruciform plan, consisting of a nave, a timber framed south porch, north and south transepts, a chancel, and a west tower. The tower has three stages, various buttresses, a clock face on the south front, and an embattled coped parapet with a pyramidal cap and a weathervane.	I
Plowden Hall; 52.47389°N 2.92070°W	—	c. 1300	A country house that was altered and extended throughout the later centuries. It is timber framed with infill in wattle and daub and brick, partly rendered, partly refaced in limestone, and with slate roofs. The house has an irregular H-shaped plan, with originally a three-bay hall range, followed in sequence by a three-bay cross-wing to the south, a parallel south cross-wing, and later a three-bay north cross-wing. Different parts have one storey with an attic, two storeys, and two storeys with an attic. The windows are windows and there are two gabled dormers. Some of the storeys are jettied with moulded bressumers.	II*
9 Brockton; 52.46625°N 2.99006°W	—	14th century (probable)	The house was altered in about 1600 and extended in the 19th century. The original part is timber framed with cruck construction, the refacing and the extension are in limestone, and the roof is slated. There are two storeys and a T-shaped plan, consisting of a two-bay hall range, and a gabled cross-wing. On the front is a porch with a hipped roof, some of the windows are casements, and others are cross-windows. Inside are three full cruck trusses.	II
28 Brockton; 52.46555°N 2.99136°W	—	14th century (probable)	The house was extended in the 17th century and refaced in the 19th century. The original part is timber framed with cruck construction, the refacing and the extension are in limestone, the end wall is rendered, and the roof is thatched. The original part has one bay and one storey, and the extension has one storey and an attic. The original part has a jettied gable and an eaves dormer. In the extension is a central doorway and casement windows. Inside the original part are two full cruck trusses.	II
Barn, Acton Farm; 52.45823°N 3.01154°W	—	15th century	Originally a house, later a barn, it was extended in the 17th and 19th centuries. The original part is timber framed with cruck construction on a limestone plinth, with weatherboarding and some cladding in corrugated iron, the 19th-century extension is in limestone, and the roof is partly in stone-slate and partly in corrugated iron. The original part has one storey and three bays, the additional bay has an added floor, and the 19th-century extension is a cross-wing with two storeys. In the west front is a gabled eaves loft dormer, and inside are full cruck trusses.	II
Choulton Cottage; 52.48863°N 2.91821°W	—	c. 1500	The cottage was refaced and extended in the 19th century. It is basically timber framed with cruck construction, refaced and extended in limestone and has a slate roof. The original part has one storey and an attic and three bays, and the extension is at right angles with two storeys, forming an L-shaped plan. The windows are casements, and inside are two full cruck trusses.	II
Long Thatch; 52.46955°N 2.95657°W	—	c. 1500	A timber framed cottage with cruck construction and rendered infill on a stone plinth, and with a thatched roof. There are seven bays, a gabled porch, casement windows, and a raking eaves dormer. Inside is a full cruck truss.	II
Lower Down Farmhouse; 52.45384°N 2.97764°W	—	16th century (probable)	The farmhouse has been much altered and extended in limestone leaving little original timber framing, and the roof is slated. There are two storeys, and a basic plan of a hall range with a cross-wing to the west. The doorway has a fanlight and a bracketed hood, most windows are casements, and there are some sash windows.	II
Tudor Cottage; 52.46875°N 2.95822°W	—	16th century	A house, at one time a workhouse, it was refaced and extended in the 19th century, and has been divided into two dwellings. The original part is timber framed and partly rendered, the refacing and extensions are in limestone, and the roof is slated. There are two storeys, a hall range of two bays, a two-bay cross-wing to the right, and a one-storey lean-to on the left. The cross-wing has a jettied upper floor on brackets. In the angle is a timber porch with a hipped roof.	II
Brook House; 52.46841°N 2.95748°W	—	c. 1600	Two houses, later combined into one, it was partly refaced and extended in the 19th century. It is timber framed with plaster infill, partly rendered, there is a slate-hung gable end to the left, a limestone lean-to at the east, and a tile roof. The house is partly in one storey with an attic and partly in two storeys, and there are probably three bays. In the centre of the front is a bow window, the other windows are casements, there are two gabled eaves dormers to the south, and a raking eaves dormer to the north.	II
The Firs; 52.46862°N 2.95602°W	—	c. 1600	The house was remodelled in the 19th century. It is timber framed with brick nogging, stuccoed on the front, and with a slate roof. There is one storey and an attic, and four bays. The porch is gabled, with pierced bargeboards and a finial. The windows are casements and there are three half-dormers with bargeboards and finials.	II
4 and 5 Totterton; 52.48187°N 2.94451°W	—	Early 17th century	Two cottages, later one farmhouse, it is timber framed with rendered infill, a limestone gable end to the left, a high plinth to the right, roughcast at the rear, and a slate roof. The house is partly in one storey, partly in two, and has a semi-basement to the right, and an attic. There is an L-shaped plan, with a front of three bays. On the front is a gabled porch with applied timber framing, and the windows vary: there is one mullioned and transomed window, cross-windows and casements.	II
1 Eyton and outbuilding 52.48228°N 2.92620°W	—	17th century	The house was refaced and extended in the 19th century. It is in limestone, partly rendered, with a rendered timber framed staircase wing and turret, and a tile roof. There are 1⅓ storeys and a T-shaped plan. The windows are casements, and there is a gabled dormer. The outbuilding is in stone and red brick and has a corrugated iron roof.	II
Brockton Farmhouse and stable block 52.46567°N 2.99241°W	—	17th century	The farmhouse was largely rebuilt in the 18th century, and was extended in the 19th century when the stable block was also added forming an L-shaped plan. The house was originally timber framed, the rebuilding and extension are in limestone, the stable block is timber framed with weatherboarding, and the roofs are slated. The farmhouse has two storeys, a basement and an attic, casement windows, and a gabled porch. The stable block has one storey and a loft, and contains doorways, loft doors, casement windows, and a half-dormer.	II
Choulton Farmhouse; 52.48840°N 2.91865°W	—	17th century	The farmhouse was refaced and extended in the 19th century. The original part is in stuccoed timber framing, the refacing and extensions are in limestone, partly rendered, and the roof is slated. The farmhouse has an L-shaped plan with two storeys, the wing being lower. The windows are casements, and there is a 20th-century conservatory.	II
Dovecote, Walcot Hall; 52.45955°N 2.96064°W	—	17th century (probable)	The dovecote was remodelled in the 19th century. It is in limestone with a conical tile roof, and has a circular plan, one storey and a loft. The dovecote contains a doorway and two blocked windows. Above are three hipped dormers with two tiers of dove holes, and an octagonal wooden cupola with an ogee lead cap and a globe finial.	II
Acton House Farmhouse and cartshed 52.45756°N 3.01036°W	—	Mid to late 17th century	The farmhouse was extended in the 19th century. The original part is timber framed on a limestone plinth, the extensions are in limestone, partly rendered with some applied timber framing, and the roof is slated. There are two storeys and an attic, and an L-shaped plan. In the angle is a wooden lattice porch, most of the windows are casements, there is one mullioned and transomed window, and a gabled dormer. Attached is a former cartshed and loft, which contains a timber-framed partition.	II
Red House Farmhouse; 52.46820°N 2.93691°W		Mid to late 17th century	The farmhouse is in red brick on a plinth, with bands, and a slate roof. There are two storeys, a tall basement and an attic, a U-shaped plan, with five bays, the outer bays projecting forward and gabled, and a staircase wing at the rear. Steps lead up to the central doorway that has panelled pilasters and a bracketed triangular pedimented hood. Most of the windows are cross-windows with recessed segmental tympana, in the basement and elsewhere are casement windows, on the front is a gabled dormer, and at the rear is a flat-topped eaves dormer.	II
Former Cockpit and link to Red House Farmhouse; 52.46833°N 2.93690°W	—	Mid to late 17th century	The cockpit, later a cowhouse, is in limestone and red brick, and has a pyramidal shingled roof. The building has an octagonal plan and one storey, and contains various openings. Linking it to the farmhouse is a two-storey block in stone and red brick with a slate roof.	II
Farm buildings southeast of Acton House Farmhouse; 52.45737°N 3.01007°W	—	Late 17th century	The farm buildings, which were extended in the 19th century, consist of a former threshing barn, a horse engine house, a cartshed, a granary, and pigsties. The original parts are timber framed with weatherboarding on a limestone plinth, the extensions are in limestone, most of the roofs are tiled and hipped over the horse engine house, and over the pigsties they are slated. The barn has three bays, and the horse engine house has a polygonal end. Seven steps lead up to the granary door, and there are two gabled eaves loft dormers.	II
Barn east of Choulton Farmhouse; 52.48841°N 2.91734°W	—	Late 17th century	The barn is timber framed with weatherboarding on a plinth of limestone and concrete. There is corrugated iron cladding on the west side, and a corrugated iron roof. The barn contains pitching holes and a doorway.	II
Barn and cow shed north-east of Lower Down Farmhouse; 52.45661°N 2.97568°W	—	Late 17th century	The barn and cowshed is timber framed with weatherboarding on a limestone plinth with a slate roof. There are two storeys and eight bays, and it contains doors and a loft door.	II
Eyton Farmhouse; 52.48321°N 2.92640°W	—	Late 17th century	The farmhouse was extended in the 19th century. It is in pebbledashed stone with a slate roof, and has two storeys, and an L-shaped plan. There is a gabled porch, the windows in the ground floor are mullioned and transomed, and in the upper floor they are cross-windows.	II
Barns southwest of Lower Farm House; 52.46703°N 2.95497°W	—	Late 17th century	The barns were extended in the 19th century. They are timber framed with weatherboarding on a limestone plinth, and have limestone walls to the southwest. There are seven bays, and a later one-bay addition making an L-shaped plan. The barns contain a carriageway, doors, and windows.	II
Barn northeast of Plowden Hall; 52.47444°N 2.91986°W	—	Late 17th century	The barn was later extended, it is timber framed with weatherboarding on a limestone plinth, the extensions at the ends are in limestone with red brick dressings, and the roof is in slate and corrugated iron. There are eleven bays, one storey and lofts. The barn contains casement windows, doorways, cart entrances, and pitching holes.	II
Cottage and dovecote north of White House Farmhouse; 52.45795°N 3.01160°W	—	Late 17th century (probable)	The building is in stone with a slate roof and two storeys. It contains doorways, casement windows, and dove nesting boxes with ledges. Inside is a timber framed partition wall.	II
Cowhouse, hayloft and granary north of White House Farmhouse; 52.45747°N 3.01123°W	—	Late 17th century	The farm building is timber framed with weatherboarding on a limestone plinth and it has a tile roof. It has one storey and a loft, and five bays. The building contains cowhouse doors and horizontally-sliding slatted windows, and there is an open-fronted three-bay cartshed with concrete walls. Twelve stone steps in the right gable end lead up to a granary door.	II
Former barn and cowhouse north-east of White House Farmhouse; 52.45723°N 3.01101°W	—	Late 17th century	The barn is the older, the cowhouse dating from the 19th century. The building is partly timber framed and partly in stone with a corrugated iron roof. There is one storey and a loft, the original part has four bays, and the extension is to the south. The building contains doorways, loft doors, and gabled eaves dormers.	II
Dawes Lines; 52.44425°N 2.98793°W	—	c. 1700	The cottage is timber framed with rendered infill, limestone end walls, and a corrugated iron roof, half-hipped to the right. There is one storey and an attic, and two bays. In the centre is a doorway flanked by casement windows. and there are two gabled half-dormers.	II
Little Hamperley; 52.49858°N 2.85960°W	—	c. 1700	A cottage that was altered in the 19th century, it is in rendered timber framing with a limestone wall to the south, and a tile roof. There is one storey and an attic, two bays. It has a gabled porch, casement windows, and two gabled eaves dormers.	II
The Long Mynd Cottage; 52.48817°N 2.91790°W	—	c. 1700	A cottage and former smithy in limestone with a tile roof. It has one storey and an attic, with the former smithy to the right. The windows are casements, there are two gabled eaves dormers, and inside are timber framed partition walls.	II
2 and 3 Plowden Hall; 52.47413°N 2.92021°W	—	Early to mid 18th century	A pair of cottages, previously used for other purposes including a coach house, in limestone with some roughcast. quoins and slate roofs. They have two storeys, and an archway. The windows are casements with dropped keystones.	II
2 Lower Gardens; 52.46342°N 2.95195°W	—	18th century	Originally a service wing, later a house, it was extended in the 19th century. It is timber framed to the north, in red brick to the south, and has slate roofs, partly hipped. The house has two storeys, some windows are sashes, others are casements, one in a segmental arch, and there is a dormer. There is also a conservatory, and a ha-ha to the south.	II
Powis Arms; 52.46714°N 2.95967°W		18th century	The public house, which was largely rebuilt in the 19th century, is in limestone and has a hipped slate roof. The main block has three storeys, three bays, and flanking outshuts, and there is a two-storey three-bay wing on the right. Two flights of steps lead up to a central doorway that has a segmental-headed fanlight. The windows are casements with segmental heads.	II
Chest tomb 52.46827°N 2.95494°W	—	Mid to late 18th century	The chest tomb is in the churchyard of St Michael's Church. It is in ashlar stone, and has a stepped base, sunken panels, shaped quarter-baluster corners, and a moulded cornice. The inscription is illegible.	II
Ice house, store and wall, Walcot Hall; 52.45997°N 2.96355°W	—	c. 1763	The combined ice house and vegetable store are in limestone with a slate roof, partly covered in earth. It has a square plan and two segmental-arched entrances. Inside is a tunnel leading to a circular ice house and two vegetable stores. Attached to the building is a limestone wall about 60 metres (200 ft) long and 2 metres (6 ft 7 in) high.	II
The Garden House; 52.45880°N 2.96303°W	—	After 1763	Originally a gazebo in the grounds of Walcot Hall, and later a house, it is in red brick with dentil eaves cornice, and a pyramidal slate roof. It has a hexagonal plan with an extension to the southeast, and a lean-to the northeast. The windows are sashes, and on the roof are three pedimented dormers and a hexagonal wooden cupola with a pyramidal lead cap.	II*
Garden walls, The Garden House; 52.45898°N 2.96294°W	—	After 1763	The garden walls flank The Garden House to the north and the south, and are in red brick with stone coping. There are two lengths, each about 70 metres (230 ft) long and 3 metres (9.8 ft) high.	II
1–12 Walcot Hall Flats, 1–3 Clock Tower House, and wall 52.45917°N 2.96145°W	—	After 1763	The former stables of Walcot Hall, partly converted into flats, they are in red brick with stone dressings and slate roofs. There are two ranges enclosing a courtyard, and at the entrance is a tower with a clock stage and a cupola over a carriageway. The northeast range has two storeys, and 16 bays, the middle four bays projecting with a triangular pedimented gable, with a clock in the tympanum, and a cupola with an entablature, and a lead dome with a globe finial and a weathervane. Attached is a red brick wall with stone coping about 25 metres (82 ft) long.	II
Walcot Hall; 52.45883°N 2.95972°W		1764–67	A country house, it was rebuilt on the site of an earlier house, and designed by Sir William Chambers for Lord Clive. It was altered in 1784–90 by Joseph Bromfield, and rationised in 1933. The house is in red brick on a stone plinth, with stone dressings, quoins, a coped parapet, and a hipped slate roof. It has two storeys, basements and attics, a front of eleven bays, an irregular U-shaped plan, a projecting ballroom, and a service wing. On the front is a single-storey three-bay portico with unfluted monolithic Doric columns and pilasters, an architrave, a triglyph frieze, and a dentil cornice. There is balustrading above the windows, and nine segmental-headed dormers.	II*
10 and 11 Lydbury North; 52.46999°N 2.95675°W	—	Late 18th century	A pair of cottages timber framed and rendered to the right, in limestone to the left, and with a slate roof. They have one storey and an attic, one room each, and lean-tos at each end. The windows are casements, there are two gabled eaves dormers, and inside are timber-framed partitions.	II
47 Lydbury North; 52.46805°N 2.95366°W		Late 18th century	The cottage was extended in the 19th century. The earlier part to the left is in rendered timber framing, the part to the right is in limestone, and the roof is slated. There is one storey and an attic, and the cottage contains doorways, casement windows, and three gabled eaves dormers.	II
Brockton Lodge; 52.46237°N 2.98449°W	—	Late 18th century	A former estate lodge, it was remodelled in the 19th century. The lodge is in limestone, partly rendered, and has a tile roof. There are two storeys, and a timber framed lean-to porch on the right. Most of the windows are casements, and in the upper floor of the gable end facing the road is a Gothic window with Y-tracery.	II
Milestone near Totterbank Bridge; 52.48245°N 2.93812°W	—	Late 18th century	The milestone was provided for the turnpike road. It is in sandstone with a segmental head, and is inscribed with the distances in miles to Bishops Castle, Marshbrook and Craven Arms. The names of the destinations are abbreviated.	II
1 Lower Gardens; 52.46339°N 2.95159°W	—	c. 1800	The house was extended in about 1840. It is in red brick and has slate roofs with a coped parapet. There are two storeys, three parallel ranges, and two central doors with a rectangular fanlight. The windows are sashes, and there is a 20th-century conservatory. The left range has a hipped roof, and a stone eaves band. To the south is a ha-ha.	II
Garden wall, 1 Lower Gardens; 52.46330°N 2.95121°W	—	c. 1800	The garden wall is to the east of the house. It is in red brick with buttresses and stone coping, it contains a doorway, and is ramped up to the house. The wall is in two sections at right angles, it totals about 60 metres (200 ft) in length, and is about 3 metres (9.8 ft) high.	II
Totterton Hall; 52.48162°N 2.94263°W	—	c. 1814	A country house, it is in red brick on a stone plinth, with stone dressings, sill bands, a moulded and dentilled eaves cornice, and a slate roof, hipped to the left. It is in late Georgian style, and has two storeys and an entrance front of five bays. Between the bays are pilasters, and above the central bay is a pedimented gable. There is a central porch with Roman Doric columns and pilasters, an architrave, a frieze, a cornice, and a blocking course. The south front has three bays, there is a recessed one-storey picture gallery, and the windows are cross-windows.	II
Milestone, Stank Lane; 52.47996°N 2.96720°W	—	Early 19th century (probable)	The milestone is in limestone and has a rounded top. It is inscribed with the distances in miles to London and to Bishop's Castle, the rest of the inscription being illegible.	II
Lake Cottage; 52.46299°N 2.97225°W	—	Mid 19th century	An estate cottage in limestone with a hipped slate roof. There are two storeys, two bays, and outshuts at the rear. In the centre is an arched doorway, and the windows are arched casements with intersecting tracery.	II
The Station House and The Station Bungalow; 52.48298°N 2.91229°W		c. 1865	Originally the station and stationmaster's house for Plowden railway station on the Bishop's Castle Railway, and later two private houses. They are in red brick on plinths, with dressings in grey brick and sandstone and slate roofs, and are in Tudor Gothic style. The former station has one storey and the house has two, the station has an H-shaped plan, and the house is to the southeast. The gables have pierced and decorative bargeboards and finials, the windows are casements, and in the house is a gabled half-dormer.	II
Former game store, Walcot Hall; 52.45946°N 2.96063°W	—	Mid to late 19th century	The game store, now disused, is timber framed, and has a pyramidal stone-slate roof. It has an octagonal plan, and contains a doorway on the southeast side.	II
Milestone near Acton House Farmhouse; 52.45774°N 3.01539°W	—	Mid to late 19th century	The milestone is in stone and has a rounded top. It is inscribed with the distances in miles to Bishops Castle, Clun, and Knighton. The names of the destinations are abbreviated.	II
Milestone near Eaton Bridge; 52.50007°N 2.92382°W	—	Mid to late 19th century	The milestone is in stone, and is inscribed with the distances in miles to Church Stoke, Marshbrook and Craven Arms. The names of the destinations are abbreviated.	II
Milestone near Lea Castle; 52.50305°N 2.94690°W	—	Mid to late 19th century	The milestone is in stone and has a rounded top. It is inscribed with the distances in miles to Church Stoke, Marshbrook and Craven Arms. The names of the destinations are abbreviated.	II
Milestone near Plowden Mill; 52.48186°N 2.89469°W	—	Mid to late 19th century	The milestone is in stone and has a segmental head. It is inscribed with the distances in miles to Bishops Castle, Marshbrook and Craven Arms. The names of the destinations are abbreviated.	II
Milestone near Red House Farmhouse; 52.46149°N 2.93660°W	—	Mid to late 19th century	The milestone is in stone and has a rounded top. It is inscribed with the distances in miles to Bishops Castle and Craven Arms. The names of the destinations are abbreviated.	II
Plowden Mill; 52.47881°N 2.90753°W	—	Mid to late 19th century	An estate water mill in limestone with dressings in red brick and a slate roof. There are three storeys and an attic, a lean-to on the right, and an adjoining wheelhouse in red brick with a corrugated iron roof. It contains doorways, loft doors, cast iron windows with segmental heads, and a circular window in the gable.	II
