= Lydham Heath railway station =

Former railway station in England

Lydham Heath
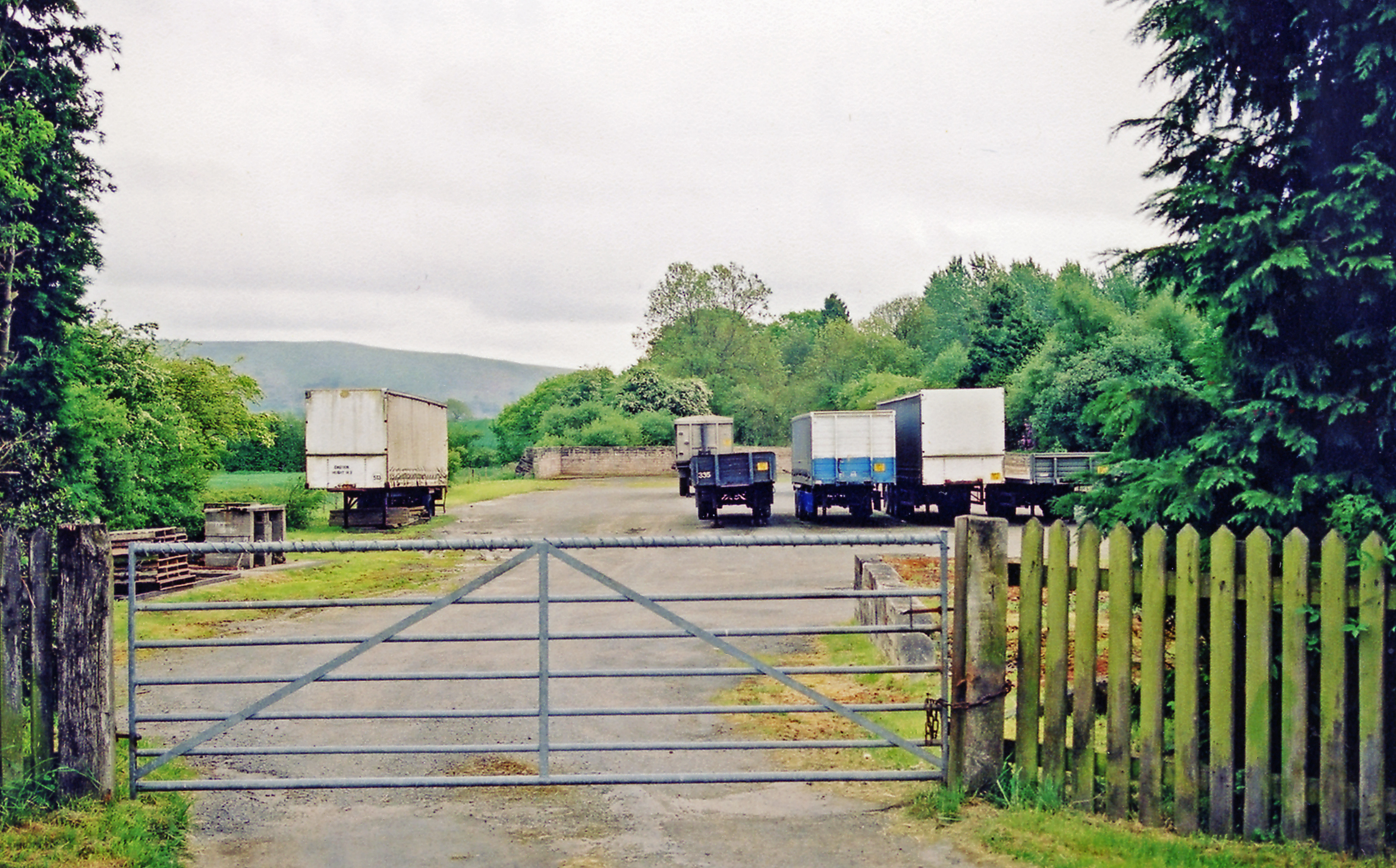
- The site of the former Lydham Heath station in 2001

General information
- Location: Lydham, Shropshire; England
- Coordinates: 52.5088°N 2.9645°W
- Grid reference: SO345906
- Platforms: 1

Other information
- Status: Disused

History
- Original company: Bishops Castle Railway
- Pre-grouping: Bishops Castle Railway
- Post-grouping: Bishops Castle Railway

Key dates
- 1 February 1866: Opened
- 20 April 1935: Closed
Location

Lydham Heath railway station was a station in Lydham, Shropshire, England. The station was opened on 1 February 1866 and closed on 20 April 1935.

As of September 2009, the only visible remains of the station is the cattle dock.

Preceding station	Disused railways	Following station
Terminus	Bishops Castle Railway	Eaton; Line and station closed
Terminus	Bishops Castle Railway	Bishop's Castle; Line and station closed
