= Eaton railway station =

Railway station in Shropshire, England

Eaton
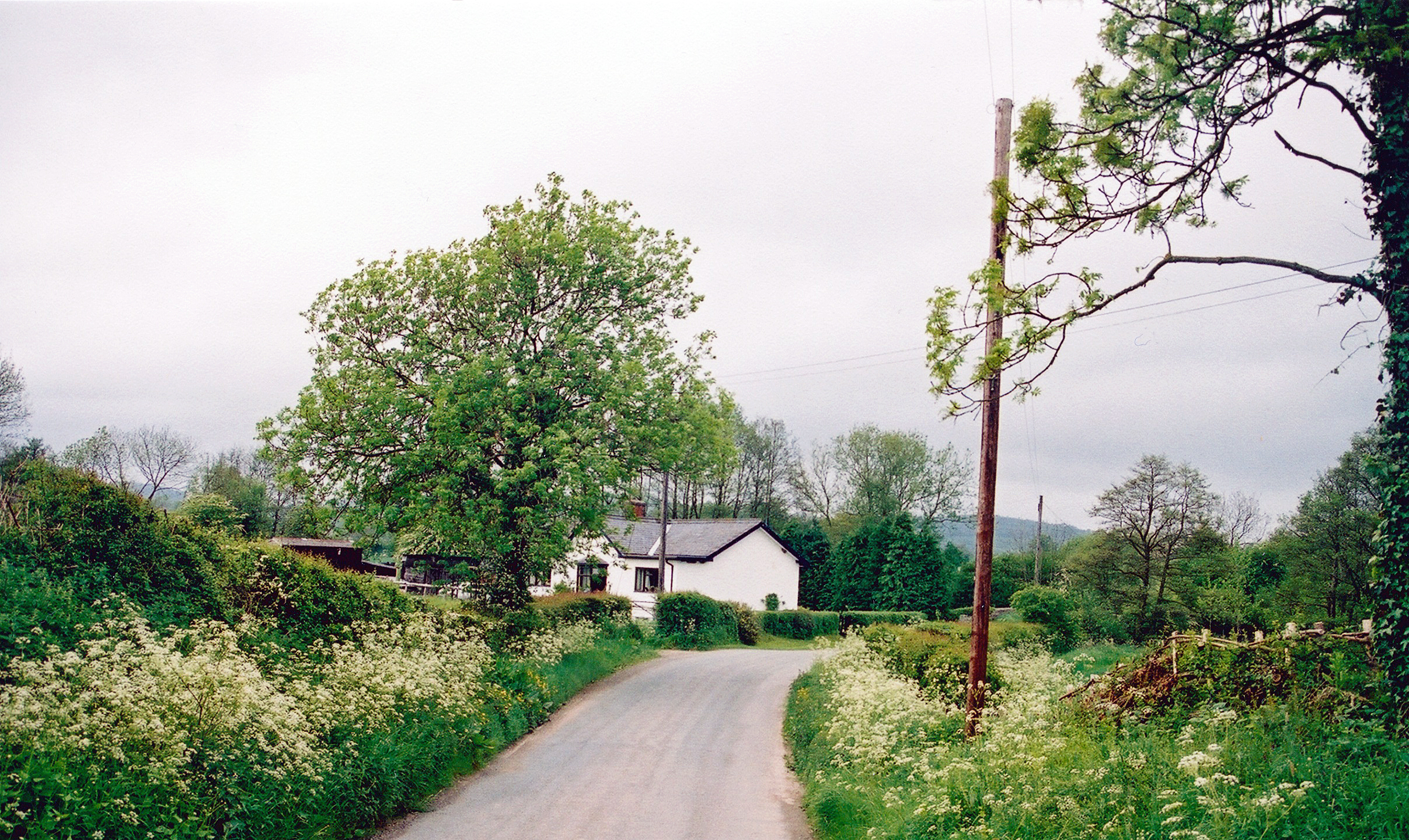
- The station building is now a private residence

General information
- Location: Eaton, Bishop's Castle, Shropshire; England
- Coordinates: 52.5011°N 2.9228°W
- Grid reference: SO374897
- Platforms: 1

Other information
- Status: Disused

History
- Original company: Bishops Castle Railway
- Pre-grouping: Bishops Castle Railway
- Post-grouping: Bishops Castle Railway

Key dates
- March 1866: Opened
- 20 April 1935: Closed
Location

Eaton railway station was a station in Eaton, Bishop's Castle, Shropshire, England. The station was opened in March 1866 and closed on 20 April 1935.

Preceding station	Disused railways	Following station
Lydham Heath; Line and station closed	Bishops Castle Railway	Plowden; Line and station closed
