= Lydbury North =

Village in Shropshire, England

Coordinates: 52.468°N 2.956°W

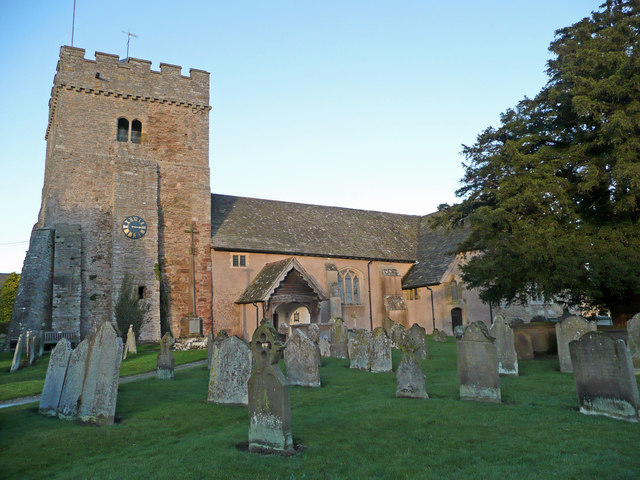
- St Michael's and All Angels, the parish church of Lydbury North

- Location within Shropshire
- Population: 695 (2011)
- OS grid reference: SO352859
- Civil parish: Lydbury North
- Unitary authority: Shropshire
- Ceremonial county: Shropshire
- Region: West Midlands
- Country: England
- Sovereign state: United Kingdom
- Post town: LYDBURY NORTH
- Postcode district: SY7
- Dialling code: 01588
- Police: West Mercia
- Fire: Shropshire
- Ambulance: West Midlands
- UK Parliament: Ludlow

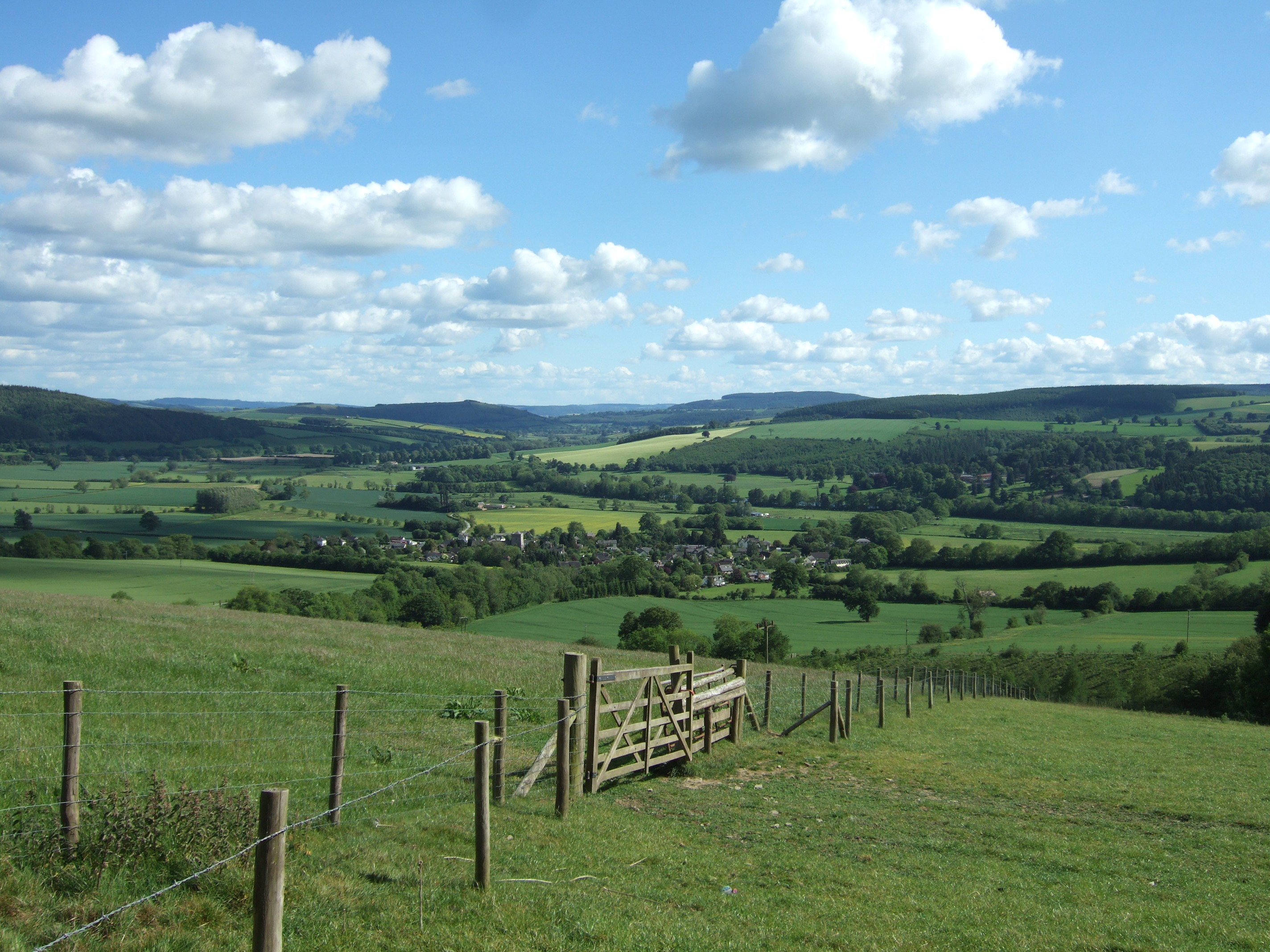
Lydbury North and the Kemp valley as viewed from Oakeley Mynd

Lydbury North (/lɪdbriː/ LID-bree) is a village and a geographically large civil parish in south Shropshire, England. The population of the parish at the 2011 census was 695. The parish is locally called Lydbury, and there is no settlement called Lydbury South.

It lies in the southwest corner of the county, near to the towns of Clun and Bishop's Castle. The B4385 road runs through the village, as does the Jack Mytton Way. To the west is the village and parish of Colebatch. There is a part-time post office, community shop, school and church. Also there is a public house called the Powis Arms. The parish church, St Michael and All Angels, contains a small Catholic chapel.

The village is at grid reference SO352859 and lies between 155m and 165m above sea level. Whilst the land to the south is flat, to the north it rises steeply.

== Settlements ==
Priors Holt, Priors Holt Hill and Churchmoor are at the northeastern extremities of the parish. Other settlements include Acton, Choulton, Eyton, Plowden and Walcot.

== Etymology ==
According to the Institute for Name Studies the name is Old English in derivation and means 'Fortification on the *Hlyde (= noisy stream)', perhaps an early name for the River Kemp.

== Walcot Hall ==
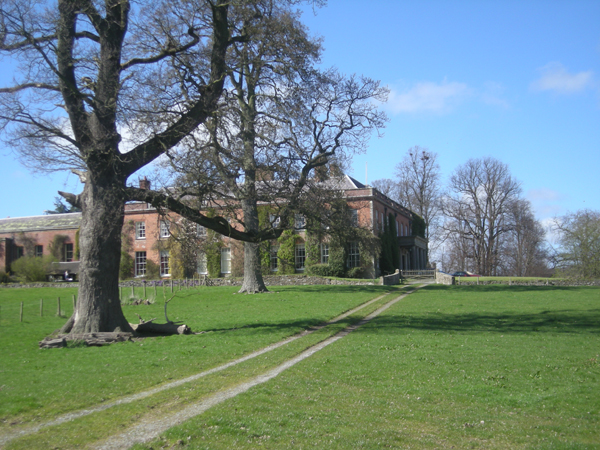
Walcot Hall

Walcot Hall is a Georgian country house to the south of the village. An original Elizabethan manor house was remodelled in 1764 by Sir William Chambers for Clive of India, who had bought the estate from Charles Walcot. It is constructed in two storeys of red brick with a slate roof to an irregular U-shaped floor plan

Walcot Pool, a large body of water which is part of the estate, was created by French prisoners of war during the Napoleonic War.

From 1929 to the Second World War the estate was a bird sanctuary for the Stevens brothers, Ronald and Noel, sons of Ernest Stevens founder and owner of the 'Judge' hollowware company of Stourbridge. One brother was an authority on the raptors and the other on water fowl. In an article in Country Life (June 1936) their two collections were deemed to be of 'world class'. Notable among the royalty who passed through the doors was Emperor Haile Selassie in 1936 who, at that time in exile, lived in Bath, Somerset. Shropshire Archives have a photograph (ref: PH/W/2/17) of the Stevens brothers meeting him and his daughter at Craven Arms railway station. The British army took over the estate for the duration of the Second World War and the collection was dispersed. The brothers returned after the war and rebuilt the collection. During the Stevens occupation the cluttered original entrance hall was remodelled with much open space gained and a sweeping wooden staircase now illuminated by large roof lights, for the brothers to entertain their numerous guests in grand style. The collection of birds went to Bristol Zoological Gardens in Clifton in 1956 when the Stevens brothers put the property on the market.

Since 1957 it has been owned by the Parish family and used for weddings, corporate hospitality and accommodation.

== See also ==
- Listed buildings in Lydbury North
