= Lydham =

Coordinates: 52.5124°N 2.9814°W

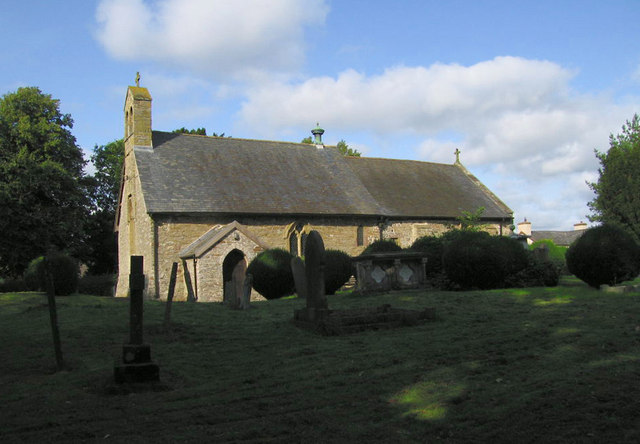
- Lydham church

- Location within Shropshire
- Population: 189 (2011)
- OS grid reference: SO334909
- Civil parish: Lydham
- Unitary authority: Shropshire
- Ceremonial county: Shropshire
- Region: West Midlands
- Country: England
- Sovereign state: United Kingdom
- Post town: BISHOPS CASTLE
- Postcode district: SY9
- Dialling code: 01588
- Police: West Mercia
- Fire: Shropshire
- Ambulance: West Midlands
- UK Parliament: Ludlow

Lydham is a small village and civil parish in Shropshire, England.

Lydham is situated on the junction of the A488 and the A489 main roads, about 2 miles (3.2 km) north of Bishop's Castle.

There is a market held on Fridays in the village hall. Close by is the small village and separate parish of More.

== History ==
Two miles to the south-east, in the parish of Lydham, are the fragmentary remains of Lea Castle, adjoining a modern farmhouse at Lower Lea.

=== Railway ===
Lydham was served by the now defunct Bishops Castle Railway which closed in 1935. The station was nearby at Lydham Heath.

== See also ==
- Listed buildings in Lydham
