= Plowden, Shropshire =

Coordinates: 52.483°N 2.913°W

Plowden
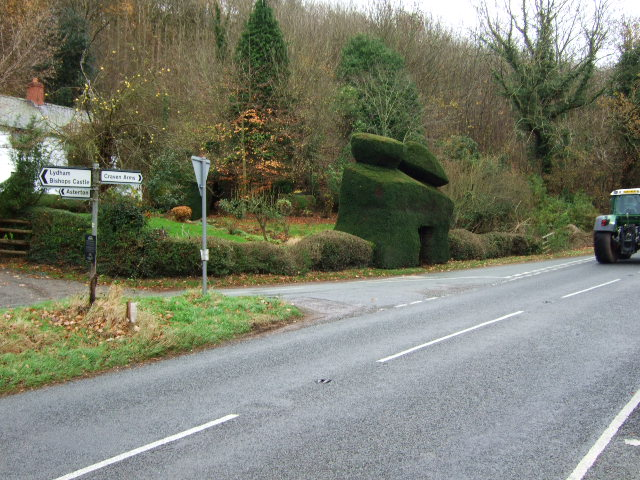
- Topiary at Plowden

- Location within Shropshire
- OS grid reference: SO384875
- Civil parish: Lydbury North
- Unitary authority: Shropshire
- Ceremonial county: Shropshire
- Region: West Midlands
- Country: England
- Sovereign state: United Kingdom
- Post town: LYDBURY NORTH
- Postcode district: SY7
- Dialling code: 01588
- Police: West Mercia
- Fire: Shropshire
- Ambulance: West Midlands
- UK Parliament: Ludlow

Plowden is a hamlet in the parish of Lydbury North, Shropshire, England. It is in the valley of the River Onny and lies 3 miles east of Bishop's Castle. Plowden was one of the stations on the Bishops Castle Railway, which closed in 1935.

Plowden Hall is a grade II* listed building, being a timber-framed building dating in part from about 1300, and is described in the novel John Inglesant by Joseph Henry Shorthouse, who drew the place as Lydiard. Its owners, the Plowden family, remained Roman Catholics after the Reformation and there is a Roman Catholic church of St Walburga in Plowden. When Edwin Plowden was awarded a life peerage in 1959 he took the title of Baron Plowden of Plowden in the county of Salop. GWR Hall class locomotive 4956 was named after the hall.

Thomas Falkner, Jesuit missionary and explorer in South America, spent his last years as chaplain at Plowden Hall until his death there in 1784.

== See also ==
- Listed buildings in Lydbury North
