= List of GWR 4900 Class locomotives =

This is a list of all GWR Hall Class engines (to the original Churchward design) built by the Great Western Railway.

Eleven of these were converted to burn oil for a short period in the 1940s. During this time, they were renumbered into the 39xx series.

GWR/BR Number	Name	Built	Withdrawn	Scrapped	Notes
4900	Saint Martin	December 1924	April 1959	Swindon Works	Rebuilt from Saint Class 2925
4901	Adderley Hall	December 1928	September 1960	Swindon Works	
4902	Aldenham Hall	December 1928	September 1963	Cohen, Swansea	
4903	Astley Hall	December 1928	October 1964	Steel Supply Co., Swansea	
4904	Binnegar Hall	December 1928	December 1963	Birds, Risca	
4905	Barton Hall	December 1928	November 1963	Cashmore, Great Bridge	
4906	Bradfield Hall	January 1929	September 1962	Cashmore, Great Bridge	
4907	Broughton Hall	January 1929	August 1963	Either King, Norwich or J. Cashmore Ltd	Temporarily converted to oil-burning May 1947–Apr 1950, renumbered 3903
4908	Broome Hall	January 1929	October 1963	Cashmore, Newport	
4909	Blakesley Hall	January 1929	September 1962	Cashmore, Newport	
4910	Blaisdon Hall	January 1929	December 1963	King, Norwich	
4911	Bowden Hall	February 1929	June 1941	Swindon Works	Destroyed in air raid at Keyham in 1941
4912	Berrington Hall	February 1929	August 1962	Swindon Works	
4913	Baglan Hall	February 1929	September 1962	Hayes, Bridgend	
4914	Cranmore Hall	February 1929	December 1963	Birds, Risca	
4915	Condover Hall	February 1929	February 1963	Swindon Works	
4916	Crumlin Hall	February 1929	August 1964	Cohen, Swansea	
4917	Crosswood Hall	March 1929	September 1962	Cashmore, Newport	
4918	Dartington Hall	March 1929	June 1963	Hayes, Bridgend	
4919	Donnington Hall	March 1929	October 1964	Steel Supply Company, Swansea	
4920	Dumbleton Hall	March 1929	December 1965	—	Preserved
4921	Eaton Hall	April 1929	September 1962	King, Norwich	
4922	Enville Hall	April 1929	July 1963	Cashmore, Newport	
4923	Evenley Hall	April 1929	May 1964	Cashmore, Great Bridge	
4924	Eydon Hall	May 1929	October 1963	Coopers Metals, Sharpness	
4925	Eynsham Hall	May 1929	August 1962	Swindon Works	
4926	Fairleigh Hall	May 1929	September 1961	Swindon Works	
4927	Farnborough Hall	May 1929	September 1963	Cohen, Swansea	
4928	Gatacre Hall	May 1929	Dec 1963	Cashmore, Newport	
4929	Goytrey Hall	May 1929	March 1965	Cashmore, Newport	
4930	Hagley Hall	May 1929	Dec 1963	—	Preserved
4931	Hanbury Hall	May 1929	July 1962	Hayes, Bridgend	
4932	Hatherton Hall	June 1929	Nov 1964	Hayes, Bridgend	
4933	Himley Hall	June 1929	August 1964	Cashmore, Great Bridge	
4934	Hindlip Hall	June 1929	September 1962	Cashmore, Newport	
4935	Ketley Hall	June 1929	March 1963	Cashmore, Newport	
4936	Kinlet Hall	June 1929	Jan 1964	—	Preserved
4937	Lanelay Hall	June 1929	Sep 1962	Swindon Works	
4938	Liddington Hall	June 1929	Nov 1962	Swindon Works	
4939	Littleton Hall	July 1929	Feb 1963	Wolverhampton Works	
4940	Ludford Hall	July 1929	Nov 1959	Swindon Works	First 'normal' withdrawal.
4941	Llangedwyn Hall	July 1929	Oct 1962	Cashmore, Newport	
4942	Maindy Hall	July 1929	Dec 1963	—	Rebuilt in preservation to Saint Class 2999 Lady of Legend
4943	Marrington Hall	July 1929	Dec 1963	Birds, Swansea	
4944	Middleton Hall	July 1929	Sep 1962	King, Norwich	
4945	Milligan Hall	August 1929	Nov 1961	Swindon Works	
4946	Moseley Hall	August 1929	Jun 1963	Cohen, Swansea	
4947	Nanhoran Hall	August 1929	Sep 1962	King, Norwich	
4948	Northwick Hall	August 1929	Sep 1962	Cashmore, Newport	Temporarily converted to oil-burning May 1947–Sep 1948, renumbered 3902
4949	Packwood Hall	August 1929	Sep 1964	Birds, Llanelli	
4950	Patshull Hall	August 1929	May 1964	Central Wagon Company, Wigan	
4951	Pendeford Hall	July 1929	Jun 1964	Cashmore, Newport	
4952	Peplow Hall	August 1929	Sep 1962	Hayes, Bridgend	
4953	Pitchford Hall	August 1929	May 1963	—	Preserved
4954	Plaish Hall	August 1929	Nov 1964	Cashmore, Great Bridge	
4955	Plaspower Hall	August 1929	Oct 1963	Cohen, Swansea	
4956	Plowden Hall	September 1929	Jul 1963	Cashmore, Newport	
4957	Postlip Hall	September 1929	Mar 1962	Swindon Works	
4958	Priory Hall	September 1929	Sep 1964	Cashmore, Newport	
4959	Purley Hall	September 1929	Dec 1964	Buttigieg, Newport	
4960	Pyle Hall	September 1929	Sep 1962	Cashmore, Newport	
4961	Pyrland Hall	November 1929	Nov 1962	Swindon Works	
4962	Ragley Hall	November 1929	Oct 1965	Birds, Risca	
4963	Rignall Hall	November 1929	Jun 1962	Swindon Works	
4964	Rodwell Hall	November 1929	Oct 1963	Cashmore, Newport	
4965	Rood Ashton Hall	November 1929	Mar 1962	—	Preserved (previously numbered as - and thought to be - 4983 Albert Hall)
4966	Shakenhurst Hall	November 1929	Nov 1963	Cashmore, Great Bridge	
4967	Shirenewton Hall	December 1929	Sep 1962	Hayes, Bridgend	
4968	Shotton Hall	December 1929	Jul 1962	Cashmore, Newport	Temporarily converted to oil-burning May 1947–Mar 1949, renumbered 3900
4969	Shrugborough Hall	December 1929	Sep 1962	Swindon Works	
4970	Sketty Hall	December 1929	Jul 1963	Cohen, Swansea	
4971	Stanway Hall	January 1930	Aug 1962	Hayes, Bridgend	Temporarily converted to oil-burning May 1947–Apr 1949, renumbered 3901
4972	St. Brides Hall (later Saint Brides Hall)	January 1930	Feb 1964	Hayes, Bridgend	Temporarily converted to oil-burning May 1947–Oct 1948, renumbered 3904
4973	Sweeney Hall	January 1930	Jul 1962	Hayes, Bridgend	
4974	Talgarth Hall	January 1930	Apr 1962	Swindon Works	
4975	Umberslade Hall	January 1930	Sep 1963	Cashmore, Newport	
4976	Warfield Hall	January 1930	May 1964	Central Wagon Company, Wigan	
4977	Watcombe Hall	January 1930	May 1962	Swindon Works	
4978	Westwood Hall	February 1930	Sep 1964	Hayes, Bridgend	
4979	Wootton Hall	February 1930	Dec 1963	—	Awaiting restoration
4980	Wrottesley Hall	February 1930	Jul 1963	Cashmore, Newport	
4981	Abberley Hall	December 1930	Oct 1963	Cashmore, Newport	
4982	Acton Hall	January 1931	May 1962	Swindon Works	
4983	Albert Hall	January 1931	Dec 1963	Swindon Works	
4984	Albrighton Hall	January 1931	Sep 1962	Hayes, Bridgend	
4985	Allersley Hall (Allesley Hall from 1931)	January 1931	Sep 1964	Cashmore, Newport	
4986	Aston Hall	January 1931	May 1962	Swindon Works	
4987	Brockley Hall	January 1931	Apr 1962	Swindon Works	
4988	Bulwell Hall	January 1931	Feb 1964	Swindon Works	
4989	Cherwell Hall	February 1931	Nov 1964	Hayes, Bridgend	
4990	Clifton Hall	February 1931	Apr 1962	Swindon Works	
4991	Cobham Hall	February 1931	Dec 1963	Cashmore, Great Bridge	
4992	Crosby Hall	February 1931	Apr 1965	Birds, Risca	
4993	Dalton Hall	February 1931	Feb 1965	Hayes, Bridgend	
4994	Downton Hall	February 1931	Mar 1963	Cashmore, Newport	
4995	Easton Hall	February 1931	Jun 1962	Swindon Works	
4996	Eden Hall	March 1931	Sep 1963	Coopers Metals, Sharpness	
4997	Elton Hall	March 1931	Oct 1961	Swindon Works	
4998	Eyton Hall	March 1931	Oct 1963	Cohen, Swansea	
4999	Gopsal Hall	March 1931	Sep 1962	Cashmore, Newport	
5900	Hinderton Hall	March 1931	Dec 1963	—	Preserved
5901	Hazel Hall	May 1931	Jun 1964	Cashmore, Great Bridge	
5902	Howick Hall	May 1931	Nov 1962	Swindon Works	
5903	Keele Hall	May 1931	Sep 1963	Cashmore, Newport	
5904	Kelham Hall	May 1931	Nov 1963	Hayes, Bridgend	Only 'Hall' that ran with an experimental eight-wheeled Collett 4,000 imperial gallon tender.
5905	Knowsley Hall	May 1931	Jul 1963	Coopers Metals, Sharpness	
5906	Lawton Hall	May 1931	May 1962	Swindon Works	
5907	Marble Hall	May 1931	Nov 1961	Swindon Works	
5908	Moreton Hall	June 1931	Jul 1963	Cashmore, Newport	
5909	Newton Hall	June 1931	Jul 1962	Hayes, Bridgend	
5910	Park Hall	June 1931	Sep 1962	Cashmore, Great Bridge	
5911	Preston Hall	June 1931	Sep 1962	Hayes, Bridgend	
5912	Queens Hall (Queen’s Hall from 1935)	June 1931	Dec 1962	Swindon Works	
5913	Rushton Hall	June 1931	May 1962	Cashmore, Newport	
5914	Ripon Hall	July 1931	Jan 1964	Cashmore, Newport	
5915	Trentham Hall	July 1931	Jan 1960	Swindon Works	
5916	Trinity Hall	July 1931	Jul 1962	Cashmore, Great Bridge	
5917	Westminster Hall	July 1931	Sep 1962	King, Norwich	
5918	Walton Hall	July 1931	Sep 1962	King, Norwich	
5919	Worsley Hall	July 1931	Aug 1963	Cashmore, Newport	
5920	Wycliffe Hall	August 1931	Jan 1962	Swindon Works	
5921	Bingley Hall	May 1933	Jan 1962	Swindon Works	
5922	Caxton Hall	May 1933	Jan 1964	Swindon Works	
5923	Colston Hall	May 1933	Dec 1963	Cox and Danks, North Acton	
5924	Dinton Hall	May 1933	Dec 1963	Birds, Risca	
5925	Eastcote Hall	May 1933	Oct 1962	Swindon Works	
5926	Grotrian Hall	June 1933	Sep 1962	Cashmore, Great Bridge	
5927	Guild Hall	June 1933	Oct 1964	Cashmore, Great Bridge	
5928	Haddon Hall	June 1933	May 1962	Swindon Works	
5929	Hanham Hall	June 1933	Oct 1963	Hayes, Bridgend	
5930	Hannington Hall	June 1933	Sep 1962	Cashmore, Great Bridge	
5931	Hatherley Hall	June 1933	Sep 1962	Swindon Works	
5932	Haydon Hall	June 1933	Oct 1965	Cashmore, Newport	
5933	Kingsway Hall	June 1933	Aug 1965	Birds, Bynea	
5934	Kneller Hall	June 1933	May 1964	Hayes, Bridgend	
5935	Norton Hall	July 1933	May 1962	Coopers Metals, Sharpness	
5936	Oakley Hall	July 1933	Jan 1965	Swindon Works	
5937	Stanford Hall	July 1933	Nov 1963	Cashmore, Newport	
5938	Stanley Hall	July 1933	May 1963	Wolverhampton Works	
5939	Tangley Hall	July 1933	Oct 1964	Hayes, Bridgend	
5940	Whitbourne Hall	August 1933	Sep 1962	Cashmore, Newport	
5941	Campion Hall	February 1935	Jul 1962	Swindon Works	
5942	Doldowlod Hall	February 1935	Dec 1963	Cashmore, Great Bridge	
5943	Elmdon Hall	March 1935	Jun 1963	Coopers Metals, Sharpness	
5944	Ickenham Hall	March 1935	Apr 1963	Cashmore, Newport	
5945	Leckhamton Hall	March 1935	Apr 1963	Swindon Works	
5946	Marwell Hall	March 1935	Jul 1962	Hayes, Bridgend	
5947	Saint Benets Hall (Saint Benet’s Hall from 1935).	March 1935	Jul 1962	Swindon Works	
5948	Siddington Hall	March 1935	Aug 1963	Hayes, Bridgend	
5949	Trematon Hall	April 1935	May 1961	Swindon Works	
5950	Wardley Hall	April 1935	Nov 1961	Swindon Works	
5951	Clyffe Hall	December 1935	Apr 1964	Cashmore, Great Bridge	
5952	Cogan Hall	December 1935	Jun 1964	—	Awaiting restoration
5953	Dunley Hall	December 1935	Oct 1962	Swindon Works	
5954	Faendre Hall	December 1935	Oct 1963	Coopers Metals, Sharpness	
5955	Garth Hall	December 1935	Apr 1965	Birds, Risca	Temporarily converted to oil-burning Jun 1946–Oct 1948, renumbered 3950
5956	Horsley Hall	December 1935	Mar 1963	Swindon Works	
5957	Hutton Hall	December 1935	Jul 1964	Birds, Swansea	
5958	Knolton Hall	January 1936	Mar 1964	Hayes, Bridgend	
5959	Mawley Hall	January 1936	Sep 1962	Cashmore, Great Bridge	
5960	Saint Edmund Hall	January 1936	Sep 1962	King, Norwich	
5961	Toynbee Hall	June 1936	Aug 1965	Birds, Bridgend	
5962	Wantage Hall	July 1936	Nov 1964	Cashmore, Great Bridge	
5963	Wimpole Hall	July 1936	Jun 1964	Birds, Risca	
5964	Wolseley Hall	July 1936	Sep 1962	Swindon Works	
5965	Woollas Hall	August 1936	Jul 1962	Cashmore, Great Bridge	
5966	Ashford Hall	March 1937	Sep 1962	King, Norwich	
5967	Bickmarsh Hall	March 1937	Jun 1964	—	Preserved
5968	Cory Hall	March 1937	Sep 1962	Cashmore, Newport	
5969	Honington Hall	April 1937	Aug 1962	Swindon Works	
5970	Hengrave Hall	April 1937	Nov 1963	Cashmore, Newport	
5971	Merevale Hall	April 1937	Dec 1965	Cashmore, Newport	Last to be withdrawn.
5972	Olton Hall	April 1937	Dec 1963	—	Preserved; known for running the Hogwarts Express in the Harry Potter films.
5973	Rolleston Hall	May 1937	Sep 1962	Swindon Works	
5974	Wallsworth Hall	April 1937	Dec 1964	Swindon Works	
5975	Winslow Hall	May 1937	Jul 1964	Cashmore, Newport	
5976	Ashwicke Hall	September 1938	Jul 1964	Cashmore, Newport	Temporarily converted to oil-burning Apr 1947–Nov 1948, renumbered 3951
5977	Beckford Hall	September 1938	Aug 1963	Cashmore, Newport	
5978	Bodinnick Hall	September 1938	Oct 1963	Coopers Metals, Sharpness	
5979	Cruckton Hall	September 1938	Nov 1964	Hayes, Bridgend	
5980	Dingley Hall	September 1938	Sep 1962	Cashmore, Newport	
5981	Frensham Hall	October 1938	Sep 1962	Hayes, Bridgend	
5982	Harrington Hall	October 1938	Sep 1962	King, Norwich	
5983	Henley Hall	October 1938	Apr 1965	Birds, Bridgend	
5984	Linden Hall	October 1938	Jan 1965	Buttigieg, Newport	
5985	Mostyn Hall	October 1938	Sep 1963	Cashmore, Newport	
5986	Arbury Hall	November 1939	Sep 1963	Cashmore, Newport	Temporarily converted to oil-burning May 1947–Feb 1950, renumbered 3954
5987	Brocket Hall	November 1939	Jan 1964	Swindon Works	
5988	Bostock Hall	November 1939	Oct 1965	Cashmore, Great Bridge	
5989	Cransley Hall	December 1939	Jul 1962	Hayes, Bridgend	
5990	Dorford Hall	December 1939	Jan 1965	Friswell, at Banbury shed	
5991	Gresham Hall	December 1939	Jul 1964	Cashmore, Great Bridge	
5992	Horton Hall	December 1939	Aug 1965	Birds, Swansea	
5993	Kirby Hall	December 1939	May 1963	Swindon Works	
5994	Roydon Hall	December 1939	Mar 1963	Cashmore, Newport	
5995	Wick Hall	January 1940	Apr 1963	Swindon Works	
5996	Mytton Hall	June 1940	Aug 1962	Swindon Works	
5997	Sparkford Hall	June 1940	July 1962	Swindon Works	
5998	Trevor Hall	June 1940	Mar 1964	Cashmore, Great Bridge	
5999	Wollaton Hall	June 1940	Sep 1962	Swindon Works	
6900	Abney Hall	June 1940	Oct 1964	Hayes, Bridgend	
6901	Arley Hall	July 1940	Jun 1964	Birds, Risca	
6902	Butlers Hall	July 1940	May 1961	Swindon Works	Involved in fatal derailment 11 February 1961, north of Rugby Central on up express.
6903	Belmont Hall	July 1940	Sep 1965	Birds, Long Marston	
6904	Charfield Hall	July 1940	Jan 1965	Friswell, at Banbury shed	
6905	Claughton Hall	July 1940	Jun 1964	Hayes, Bridgend	
6906	Chicheley Hall	November 1940	Apr 1965	Cashmore, Great Bridge	
6907	Davenham Hall	November 1940	Feb 1965	Cashmore, Great Bridge	
6908	Downham Hall	November 1940	Jul 1965	Cashmore, Newport	
6909	Frewin Hall	November 1940	Jun 1964	Cashmore, Newport	
6910	Gossington Hall	December 1940	Oct 1965	Birds, Risca	
6911	Holker Hall	January 1941	Apr 1965	Birds, Long Marston	
6912	Helmster Hall	January 1941	Feb 1964	Hayes, Bridgend	
6913	Levens Hall	February 1941	Jun 1964	Birds, Swansea	
6914	Langton Hall	February 1941	Apr 1964	Birds, Risca	
6915	Mursley Hall	February 1941	Feb 1965	Friswell, at Banbury shed	
6916	Misterton Hall	June 1941	Aug 1965	Friswell, at Banbury shed	
6917	Oldlands Hall	June 1941	Sep 1965	Friswell, at Banbury shed	
6918	Sandon Hall	June 1941	Jun 1965	Birds, Long Marston	
6919	Tylney Hall	June 1941	Aug 1963	Swindon Works	
6920	Barningham Hall	July 1941	Dec 1963	Birds, Swansea	
6921	Borwick Hall	July 1941	Oct 1965	Friswell, at Banbury shed	
6922	Burton Hall	July 1941	Apr 1965	Birds, Long Marston	
6923	Croxteth Hall	July 1941	Dec 1965	Cashmore, Newport	
6924	Grantley Hall	August 1941	Oct 1965	Friswell, at Banbury shed	
6925	Hackness Hall	August 1941	Nov 1964	Cashmore, Great Bridge	
6926	Holkham Hall	November 1941	May 1965	Cashmore, Great Bridge	
6927	Lilford Hall	November 1941	Oct 1965	Birds, Risca	
6928	Underley Hall	November 1941	Jun 1965	Cohen, Kettering	
6929	Whorlton Hall	November 1941	Oct 1963	Cohen, Swansea	
6930	Aldersey Hall	November 1941	Oct 1965	Friswell, at Banbury shed	
6931	Aldborough Hall	December 1941	Oct 1965	Birds, Risca	
6932	Burwarton Hall	December 1941	Dec 1965	Cashmore, Newport	
6933	Birtles Hall	December 1941	Nov 1964	Cashmore, Great Bridge	
6934	Beachamwell Hall	December 1941	Oct 1965	Cashmore, Great Bridge	
6935	Browsholme Hall	December 1941	Feb 1965	Swindon Works	
6936	Breccles Hall	July 1942	Nov 1964	Hayes, Bridgend	
6937	Conyngham Hall	July 1942	Dec 1965	Cashmore, Newport	
6938	Corndean Hall	July 1942	Mar 1963	Hayes, Bridgend	
6939	Calveley Hall	July 1942	Oct 1965	Hayes, Bridgend	
6940	Didlington Hall	August 1942	May 1964	Cashmore, Great Bridge	
6941	Fillongley Hall	August 1942	Apr 1964	Cohen, Swansea	
6942	Eshton Hall	August 1942	Dec 1964	Cashmore, Newport	
6943	Farnley Hall	August 1942	Dec 1963	Birds, Risca	
6944	Fledborough Hall	September 1942	Nov 1965	Buttigieg, Newport	
6945	Glasfryn Hall	September 1942	Sep 1964	Woodfield, Cadoxton	
6946	Heatherden Hall	December 1942	Jun 1964	Birds, Risca	
6947	Helmingham Hall	December 1942	Nov 1965	Cashmore, Newport	
6948	Holbrooke Hall	December 1942	Dec 1963	Cashmore, Great Bridge	
6949	Haberfield Hall	December 1942	May 1961	Swindon Works	Temporarily converted to oil-burning May 1947–Apr 1949, renumbered 3955
6950	Kingsthorpe Hall	December 1942	Jun 1964	Cashmore, Newport	
6951	Impney Hall	February 1943	Dec 1965	Cashmore, Great Bridge	
6952	Kimberley Hall	February 1943	Dec 1965	Cashmore, Great Bridge	
6953	Leighton Hall	February 1943	Dec 1965	Cashmore, Newport	Temporarily converted to oil-burning Apr 1947–Sep 1948, renumbered 3953
6954	Lotherton Hall	March 1943	May 1964	Cohen, Swansea	
6955	Lydcott Hall	March 1943	Feb 1965	Swindon Works	
6956	Mottram Hall	March 1943	Dec 1965	Cashmore, Newport	
6957	Norcliffe Hall	April 1943	Oct 1965	Friswell, at Banbury shed	Temporarily converted to oil-burning Apr 1947–Mar 1950, renumbered 3952
6958	Oxburgh Hall	April 1943	Jun 1965	Cohen, Swansea	

== Sources ==
- Bradley, Rodger (1988). GWR Two Cylinder 4–6–0s and 2–6–0. Newton Abbot, Devon: David and Charles Publishers, plc.
- Sterndale, A.C.; Parker, L.T.; Smith, C.; Reed, P.J.T.; Tabor, F.J.; Davies, F.K.; Allcock, N.J.; Lucking, J.H. (May 1974). White, D.E. (ed.). The Locomotives of the Great Western Railway, part twelve: A Chronological and Statistical Survey. Kenilworth: RCTS. ISBN 0-901115-28-2. OCLC 499807460.
- Whitehurst, Brian (1973). Great Western Engines, Names, Numbers, Types and Classes. 1940 to Preservation. Oxford: Oxford Publishing. ISBN 0902888218.
