= Acton, Shropshire =

Village in Shropshire, England

Coordinates: 52.458°N 3.015°W

Acton
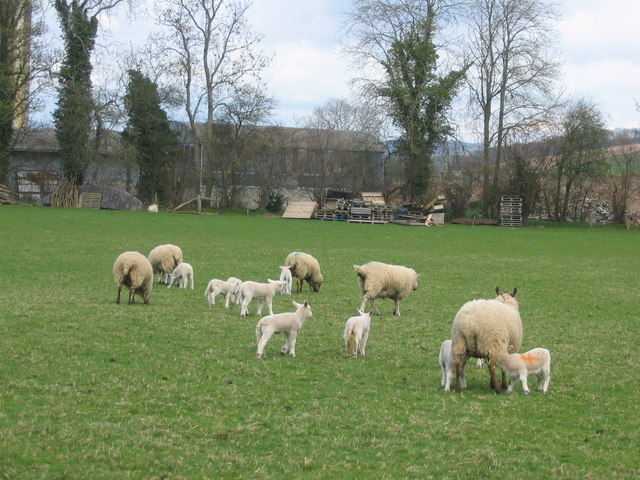
- Spring lambs at Acton

- Location within Shropshire
- OS grid reference: SO310849
- Civil parish: Lydbury North
- Unitary authority: Shropshire
- Ceremonial county: Shropshire
- Region: West Midlands
- Country: England
- Sovereign state: United Kingdom
- Post town: BISHOPS CASTLE
- Postcode district: SY9
- Dialling code: 01588
- Police: West Mercia
- Fire: Shropshire
- Ambulance: West Midlands
- UK Parliament: Ludlow

Acton is a village in Shropshire, England, south of Bishop's Castle.
