= Listed buildings in Lydham =

Lydham is a civil parish in Shropshire, England. It contains 39 listed buildings that are recorded in the National Heritage List for England. Of these, one is at Grade II*, the middle of the three grades, and the others are at Grade II, the lowest grade. The parish is to the north and east of the town of Bishops Castle, it contains the village of Lydham, and is otherwise rural. Most of the listed buildings are farmhouses and farm buildings, houses with associated structures, and cottages. A high proportion of these are timber framed, or have timber-framed cores, and some have cruck construction. The other listed buildings include a church, a tomb in the churchyard, the remains of a tower house, and nine milestones.

== Key ==
Grade	Criteria
II*	Particularly important buildings of more than special interest
II	Buildings of national importance and special interest

== Buildings ==
Name and location	Photograph	Date	Notes	Grade
Holy Trinity Church; 52.51337°N 2.98042°W		13th century	The church was restored in the 17th and 19th centuries. It is in stone with slate roofs, and consists of a nave, a lower chancel, and a south porch. At the east end is a parapeted gable, and at the west end is a 19th-century double bellcote on a medieval corbelled projection.	II*
Remains of Lea Castle; 52.49671°N 2.95734°W	—	14th century	The remains are those of a tower house, once the home of the Bishops of Hereford. They are in limestone, and consist of three fragmentary walls. The site of the building is a Scheduled Monument.	II
Lower Broughton Farmhouse; 52.50891°N 3.01274°W	—	15th century (probable)	The farmhouse was altered and extended in the 19th and 20th centuries. The original part is in rendered timber framing on a stone plinth. The end walls have been refaced, the extensions are in rendered brick, and the roof is slated. There are two storeys and an attic, and a front of four bays. On the front is a gabled porch and a bow window, and the windows are a mix of casements and sashes.	II
Former barn southeast of Lower Broughton Farmhouse; 52.50867°N 3.01238°W	—	15th century (probable)	The barn is timber framed with cruck construction and weatherboarding on a stone plinth with a corrugated iron roof. There are three bays, and a lean-to on the south. Inside are four full cruck trusses.	II
Oakeley House; 52.48581°N 2.97888°W	—	16th century	The farmhouse was altered in the 17th century and again in the 19th century when it was partly refaced. The original part is timber framed, the rebuilding and refacing is in limestone, and the roof is slated and half-hipped to the right. There is one storey and attics, and a T-shaped plan, consisting of a hall range, a cross-wing, and a projecting stone gabled wing to the right. The porch has octagonal columns and scrolled brackets, and the doorway has a reeded architrave. Most of the windows are mullioned and transomed, there is one casement window, a gabled eaves dormer, and two gabled half-dormers.	II
Owlbury Hall; 52.51940°N 3.01236°W	—	c. 1600	The house was partly refaced and extended in red brick in the 18th century. The original part, which forms the rear wing, is timber framed and rendered, and has a jettied gable. The roof is tiled and partly hipped. The house has two storeys and an irregular plan. There is a central two-storey porch with a segmental arch, some of the windows are casement windows with segmental arches, and others are sashes.	II
31 Seven Wells; 52.50585°N 3.02112°W	—	17th century	Originally a house and a byre, later combined into a house, the former house part is in siltstone and mainly rendered, the former byre is timber framed with cruck construction and weatherboarding, and the roof is slated. There is one storey, the windows are casements, and there is a cruck truss in the end wall of the byre.	II
Barn north of Heath Farmhouse; 52.51110°N 2.97920°W		17th century	Originally a threshing barn, to which a horse engine house was added in the 19th century. It is timber framed with weatherboarding on a limestone plinth and has a slate roof. The horse engine house is polygonal and has limestone piers with weatherboarding between, and a hipped roof. The barn has three bays and a central doorway.	II
Lydham Farmhouse; 52.51006°N 2.98093°W	—	17th century (probable)	The farmhouse was altered and extended in the 19th century. It is basically timber framed, but has been almost completely rebuilt in stone and rendered. It has a slate roof, two storeys, and an L-shaped plan. There is a central doorway with a fanlight, and the windows are casements. There is one surviving timber-framed bay.	II
Upper Broughton Farmhouse; 52.50976°N 3.02831°W	—	17th century	The farmhouse was extended and altered in the 19th century, in 1909, and again later in the 20th century. The original part consists of a timber framed bay, rendered and with a slate roof, and the extensions are in stone with a tile roof, and in brick with a slate roof. There is a gabled porch, some of the windows are casements, and others are mullioned and transomed.	II
Barn north-east of Lower Lea Farmhouse; 52.49738°N 2.95685°W		Late 17th century	The barn is timber framed with weatherboarding on a limestone plinth with a corrugated iron roof. It has five bays, and contains four doors, and loft doors in the gable ends.	II
Barn north of Lydham Farmhouse; 52.51026°N 2.98095°W	—	Late 17th century	The barn is timber framed with weatherboarding on a limestone plinth with a corrugated iron roof. It has three bays, and contains three doors.	II
Newton Farmhouse; 52.51450°N 2.96285°W	—	Late 17th century	The farmhouse is timber framed, the ground floor has been refaced in stone, the upper floor is rendered, and the roof is slated. There are two storeys, a basement and an attic, a front of four bays, and a rear one-bay wing. The windows are casements.	II
Barn and Shippon north of Oakeley Farmhouse; 52.48764°N 2.97663°W	—	Late 17th century	The barn was altered in the 19th century when the shippon was added. They are timber framed with weatherboarding on a limestone plinth, and the shippon has red brick dressings. The barn has one storey, the shippon has two, in the barn is a carriageway, the shippon contains doors and loft doors, and there is a cartshed to the south.	II
Former barn adjoining Lower Broughton Farmhouse; 52.50903°N 3.01276°W	—	Late 17th or early 18th century	The former barn is timber framed with weatherboarding on a stone plinth, and has a corrugated iron roof. There are two storeys and four bays, and it contains scattered doors.	II
Former barn east of Lower Broughton Farmhouse; 52.50886°N 3.01231°W	—	Late 17th or early 18th century	The barn, later a store, is timber framed with weatherboarding on a stone plinth, and has a corrugated iron roof. There are two storeys, and four bays, and it contains doorways, casement windows, and loft doors.	II
Barn east of Upper Broughton Farmhouse; 52.50984°N 3.02777°W	—	Late 17th or early 18th century	The barn is timber framed with weatherboarding on a stone plinth, and has a corrugated iron roof. There are one and two storeys, and five bays, and it contains a pair of large doors and loft doors.	II
Upper Lea Farmhouse; 52.49594°N 2.95611°W	—	c. 1725	The farmhouse is in limestone with red brick dressings and a tile roof. There are two storeys, a basement and attic, and a T-shaped plan with a front of three bays, and a single-storey block to the right. Steps lead up to the central doorway that has an architrave, a rectangular fanlight, and a semicircular hood with console brackets and a moulded cornice. The windows in the ground floor are casements, above they are mullioned and transomed, and there is a gabled eaves dormer.	II
Sundial, Roveries Hall; 52.52330°N 2.99718°W	—	1760	The sundial is in the garden of the hall, and was moved here in the 20th century. It is in limestone, and consists of a Corinthian column with a square dial head and a globe finial. Around it is a seat with four bulbous baluster legs and four curved armrests with carved lions.	II
Milestone near Lea; 52.49235°N 2.95397°W	—	Late 18th century	The milestone was provided for the turnpike road. It is in sandstone with a segmental head, and is inscribed with the distances in miles to Bishops Castle, to Marshbrook, and to Craven Arms. The names of the destinations are abbreviated.	II
Roveries Hall; 52.52298°N 2.99844°W	—	1810	A house designed by J. H. Haycock in Regency style, enlarging a previous house. It is in stuccoed limestone on a plinth, and has hipped slate roofs. The entrance front has three bays, and a porch with two unfluted Greek Doric columns and pilasters, and a full entablature. The garden front has four bays, a two-bay two-storey bow window, and the windows are sashes.	II
Lydham Manor; 52.50335°N 2.98772°W	—	1814–16	Originally the stable block of a country house designed by J. H. Haycock and since demolished. It is in limestone with some rendering at the rear, and has a hipped slate roof. There are two storeys and an U-shaped plan, with a courtyard at the rear, and a front of nine bays, the outer bays projecting slightly and pedimented. The middle bay also projects and has a cornice, an attic with a clock, and a wooden cupola with a tented lead cap and a weathervane. The central round-headed former carriage entrance has been blocked, and contains a porch with two Corinthian columns, a frieze and a cornice. The windows are mullioned and transomed.	II
Wall and coat of arms, Lydham Manor; 52.50332°N 2.98799°W	—	1814–16	The wall is in red brick with buttresses and stone coping, and is about 15 metres (49 ft) long and 2.5 metres (8 ft 2 in) high. Inserted later into the wall is a sandstone coat of arms removed from the demolished manor, including a shield in a cartouche, with a crest above, flanking oak leaves, and a motto below.	II
Edmonds tomb 52.51328°N 2.98055°W	—	c. 1827	The tomb is in the churchyard of Holy Trinity Church. It is a pedestal tomb in ashlar stone, and has a projecting base with a chamfered top, moulded corners, and a projecting chamfered top with a globe finial. There are oval side panels, one inscribed to William Edmonds who died in 1860, and the earlier inscription is illegible.	II
Cartshed and granary, Lea Castle; 52.49683°N 2.95732°W	—	Mid 19th century	The south wall of the cartshed and granary form part of the remains of Lea Castle. They have two storeys; the lower storey is in limestone, the upper storey is timber framed with weatherboarding, and the roof is in corrugated iron. The ground floor is open and there is a loft door.	II
Lower Lea Farmhouse; 52.49661°N 2.95719°W	—	Mid 19th century	The farmhouse was extended in about 1900. It is in limestone with red brick dressings, partly rendered, and with a tile roof. It is partly in one storey with an attic and basement, and partly in two storeys, and has an irregular plan. On the front are four bays, there is a slightly projecting gabled wing, and a two-storey bay windows. The other windows are mullioned and transomed, and there is a recessed porch.	II
Coach house north of Oakeley House; 52.48594°N 2.97890°W	—	Mid 19th century	The coach house is in limestone with red brick dressings and a slate roof. There are two storeys and an attic, and it contains doorways and loft doors.	II
Farm buildings west of Oakeley House; 52.48568°N 2.97929°W	—	Mid 19th century	The farm buildings consist of a cowhouse, stables with haylofts, and a granary. They are in limestone with a slate roof, two storeys, and have an L-shaped plan. The buildings contain a carriageway in the west corner, doorways, external steps, loft doors, and ventilation slits.	II
Shippon north of Lower Lea Farmhouse; 52.49751°N 2.95725°W	—	Mid to late 19th century	The shippon is timber framed with weatherboarding on a stone plinth, and has stone end walls and a tile roof. There are four bays, and one storey with a loft to the east. The shippon contains doorways and loft doors.	II
Milestone at NGR SO3310687794; 52.48394°N 2.98648°W	—	Mid to late 19th century	The milestone is in limestone and has a rounded top. It is inscribed with the distances in miles to Bishops Castle and to Craven Arms. The names of the destinations are abbreviated.	II
Milestone near Greenfield Cottages; 52.51624°N 2.95045°W	—	Mid to late 19th century	The milestone has a rounded top, and is inscribed with the distances in miles to Bishops Castle and to Shrewsbury.	II
Milestone near Heblands Cottage; 52.50621°N 2.99976°W	—	Mid to late 19th century	The milestone has a rounded top, and is inscribed with the distances in miles to Bishops Castle and to Church Stoke. The names of the destinations are abbreviated.	II
Milestone north of junction of A489 with B4383; 52.50964°N 2.96570°W		Mid to late 19th century	The milestone has a rounded top, and is inscribed with the distances in miles to Bishops Castle and to Shrewsbury.	II
Milestone northwest of junction of A489 with B4383; 52.50730°N 2.96720°W	—	Mid to late 19th century	The milestone has a rounded top, and is inscribed with the distances in miles to Church Stoke, Marshbrook and Craven Arms. The names of the destinations are abbreviated.	II
Milestone near Lydham Manor; 52.50300°N 2.98298°W	—	Mid to late 19th century	The milestone has a rounded top, and is inscribed with the distances in miles to Bishops Castle and to Shrewsbury.	II
Milestone near Roveries Hall; 52.52106°N 3.00167°W	—	Mid to late 19th century	The milestone has a rounded top, and is inscribed with the distances in miles to Church Stoke, Marshbrook and Craven Arms. The names of the destinations are abbreviated.	II
Milestone near Upper Broughton Farmhouse; 52.51001°N 3.02213°W	—	Mid to late 19th century	The milestone has a rounded top, and is inscribed with the distances in miles to Bishops Castle, and Montgomery. The names of the destinations are abbreviated.	II
Gate and gateposts 35 metres to east of Roveries Hall; 52.52297°N 2.99785°W	—	Mid to late 19th century (probable)	The gates and gateposts have been moved from another site. They are in wrought iron and are decorative, the features of the gates including S-scrolls and rosettes, and the posts have barley sugar twists and finials.	II
Gate and gateposts 70 metres to east of Roveries Hall; 52.52299°N 2.99741°W	—	Mid to late 19th century (probable)	The gates and gateposts have been moved from another site. They are in wrought iron and are decorative, the features of the gates including S-scrolls and rosettes, and the posts have barley sugar twists and finials.	II
