= Horderley railway station =

Disused railway station

Horderley
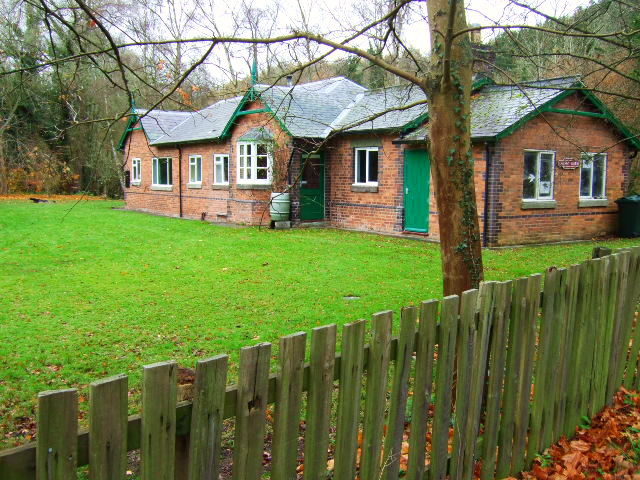
- The former railway station, now a private residence

General information
- Location: Horderley, Wistanstow, Shropshire; England
- Coordinates: 52.4762°N 2.8713°W
- Grid reference: SO409868
- Platforms: 1

Other information
- Status: Disused

History
- Original company: Bishops Castle Railway
- Pre-grouping: Bishops Castle Railway
- Post-grouping: Bishops Castle Railway

Key dates
- March 1866: Opened
- 20 April 1935: Closed
Location

Horderley railway station was a station in Horderley, Wistanstow, Shropshire, England. The station was opened in March 1866 and closed on 20 April 1935.

Preceding station	Disused railways	Following station
Plowden; Line and station closed	Bishops Castle Railway	Stretford Bridge Junction Halt; Line and station closed
