= S&DJR Fox, Walker 0-6-0ST =

Steam locomotive

Type and origin
- Power type: Steam
- Builder: Fox, Walker & Co.
- Build date: 1874–1876
- Total produced: 9
Specifications
- Configuration
  - Whyte: 0-6-0ST
  - UIC: C n2t
- Gauge: 4 ft 8 1/2 in (1,435 mm)
- Driver dia.: 4 ft 0 in (1,219 mm)
- Wheelbase: 7 ft 3 in (2,210 mm) + 7 ft 9 in (2,362 mm) = 15 ft 0 in (4,572 mm)
- Loco weight: 43 long tons 17 cwt (98,200 lb or 44.6 t)
- Fuel type: Coal
- Fuel capacity: 2 long tons 0 cwt (4,500 lb or 2 t)
- Water cap.: 1,205 imperial gallons (5,480 L; 1,447 US gal)
- Boiler pressure: 160 lbf/in^{2} (1.10 MPa)
- Heating surface
  - Firebox: 14 sq ft × 6 sq ft (1 m^{2} × 1 m^{2})
- Cylinders: Two, inside
- Cylinder size: 17 in × 24 in (432 mm × 610 mm)
- Valve gear: Stephenson
- Valve type: Slide valves
Performance figures
- Tractive effort: 19,652 lbf (87.42 kN)
Career
- Operators: Somerset and Dorset Joint Railway; → London, Midland and Scottish Railway
- Power class: LMS: 2F
- Numbers: S&DJR: 1–9; LMS: 1500–1507
- Withdrawn: 1928–1934
- Disposition: All scrapped

The S&DJR Fox, Walker 0-6-0ST was a class of nine 0-6-0ST locomotives built by Fox, Walker and Company for the Somerset and Dorset Joint Railway between 1874 and 1876 for banking duties on the Bath Extension. The first three were ordered in February 1874 at £2,350 each + part-exchange of four the SDJR's 2-4-0 locomotives (numbers 1, 3, 4 and 5). A further two more were ordered in August 1874 at £3,200 each. These were numbered 1 through 5, replacing the numbers of the part-exchanged locomotives along with the previous 2-4-0 locomotive numbered 2 that was subsequently referred to as "Old No 2".

In April 1875, two more were ordered at £3,200 each. Prior to delivery the Midland Railway and London and South Western Railway had taken over joint ownership and the Midland Railway's CME, Johnson refused to accept these unless the price was reduced. They were accepted into stock in 1857 as numbers 6 and 7 on the understanding that two more would be supplied at £2,300 each, these being number 8 and 9. All except number 8 passed in the London, Midland and Scottish Railway stock in 1930, who allocated them numbers 1500–1507. Two (1501 and 1503) never received their LMS numbers, and all were withdrawn by the end of 1934. All were scrapped.

== Modifications ==
These locomotives were modified over time. Locomotive number 1 was converted to become an 0-6-0 tender engine between 1888 and 1908. It was then converted back to a saddle tank. Number 3 was fitted with an extended saddle tank and number 8 was fitted with side tanks with 4 ft 6 in (1,370 mm) driving wheels (becoming an 0-6-0T). In 1930, number 8 was then rebuilt with a Deeley boiler and converted to a tender engine.
