= George England =

English businessman and engineer (c. 1811–1878)

George England (c. 1811–1878) was an English businessman and engineer. He founded George England and Co., a steam locomotive manufacturing business based in Hatcham, New Cross.

== Early life ==
England was born around 1811, in Newcastle upon Tyne. He moved to London and trained at the John Penn Boilerworks and Shipyards in Deptford.

== Hatcham Ironworks ==
In 1839, England patented a traversing screw jack.

In the 1840s, he set up his own works near New Cross: the Hatcham Ironworks. In the 1850s, he also had a large house built for his family and a terrace of cottages for his workers built on the site. He soon began working to build railway locomotives. The first locomotive produced at Hatcham was a 2-2-2 in December 1848 for the Newhaven Branch of the LBSCR. In 1851 he took part on the Great Exhibition where his patented screw jack and another 2-2-2 locomotive were shown; the locomotive won a gold medal. George England and Co. then produced a steady number of locomotives for customers including the Somerset and Dorset Railway, the Great Western Railway, and the London and North Western Railway.

== Robert Fairlie ==
In 1860, England met Robert Francis Fairlie, an engineer who had recently returned from India, where he had been a locomotive superintendent. Fairlie starting working at George England and Co. as a consulting engineer. He also began courting England's 17-year-old daughter Eliza Ann England. England disapproved of this relationship and forbade the couple from seeing each other. This prompted them to elope to Spain in January 1862, returning a month later. England then sued Fairlie for perjury, stating that Fairlie had sworn a false affidavit that George England, had consented to the marriage, which was not true. The resulting Central Criminal Court case, reported in The Times of 8 April 1862, caused much public interest. Under cross-examination by Serjeant Ballantyne (who appeared for Fairlie), England was forced to admit that he had run away with his present wife (Sarah Hannar), the mother of Eliza, and that he had a wife living at that time. He had lived with this lady many years but could not marry her until his wife died. By a quirk of English law, at that time, a child born out of wedlock was considered nobody's child. In law she was nothing to do with England and could marry whom she pleased. There was no case to answer and therefore a verdict of not guilty was returned.

== Strike and retirement ==
In 1865, all 250 employees of the Ironworks went on strike to dispute England's harsh working practices, especially the circumstances under which an employee could be dismissed. Even though the workers were persuaded to return, the company lost several important orders, which significantly weakened the business. England was searching for business for the Hatcham Ironworks. He approached the Ffestiniog Railway in 1868 with an offer to build a Double Fairlie locomotive, England went into business with his son-in-law.

England retired from the business in 1869, with Fairlie taking it over and renaming it the Fairlie Steam Engine and Carriage Company. After his retirement, England survived another decade until his death in 1878.
