= Peckett and Sons =

British locomotive manufacturer, 1854–1961

Coordinates: 51°28′13.24″N 2°32′28.9″W

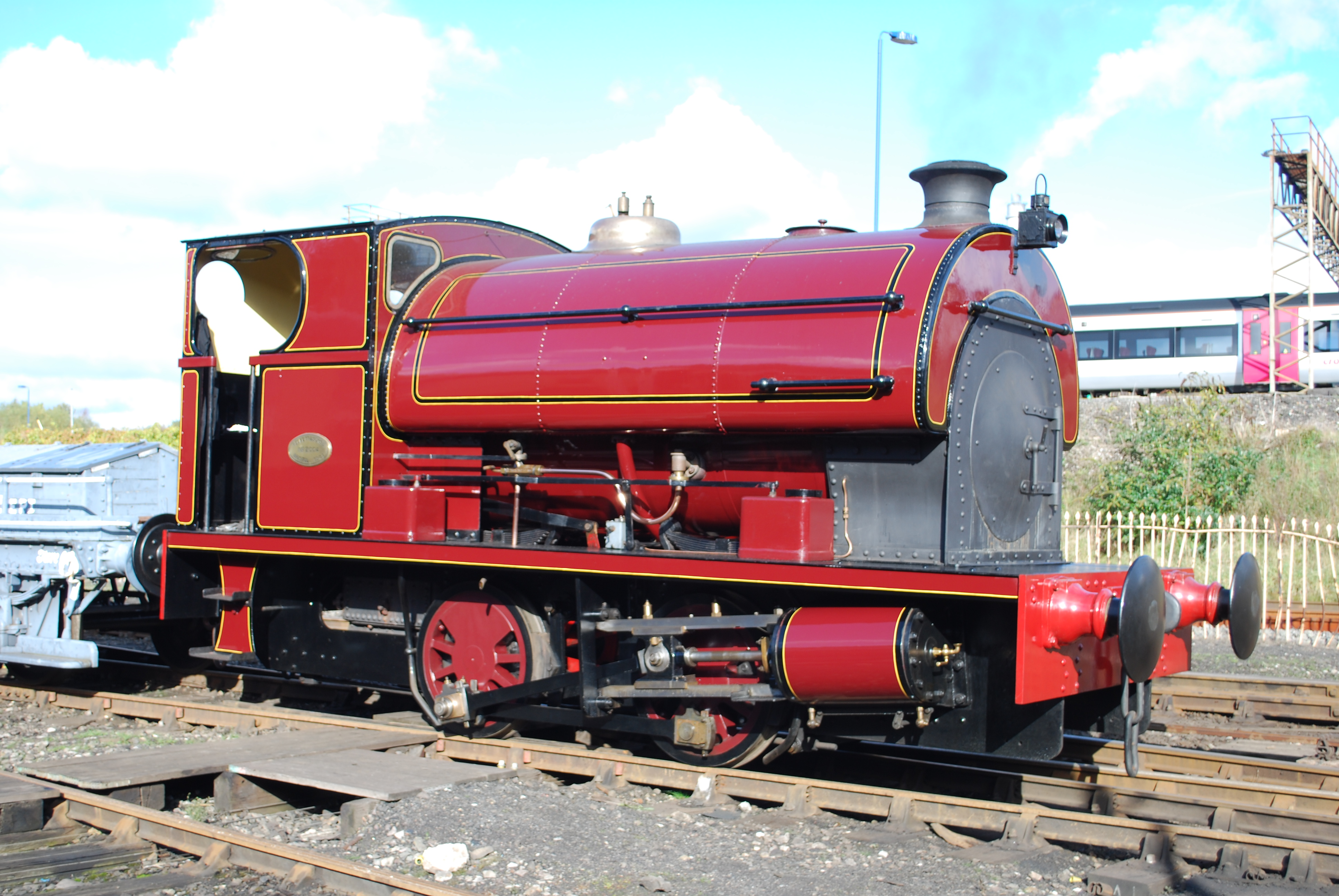
Nº 2004 of 1942

Peckett and Sons was a locomotive manufacturer at the Atlas Locomotive Works on Deep Pit Road between Fishponds and St. George, Bristol, England.

== Fox, Walker and Company ==
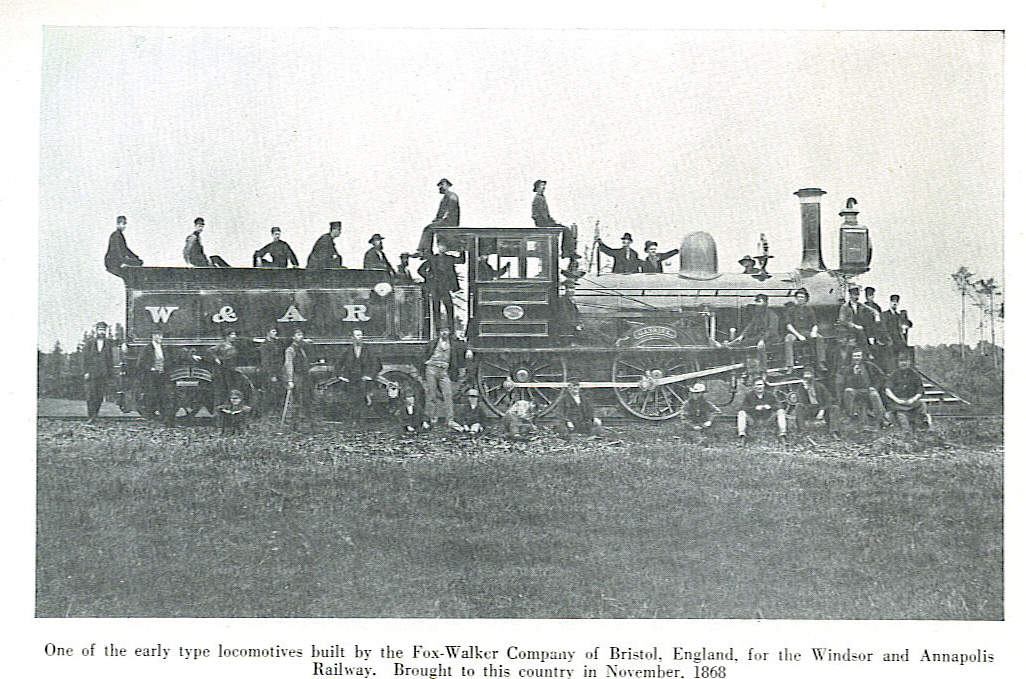
The Fox Walker locomotive "Gabriel" built for the Windsor and Annapolis Railway in Nova Scotia

The company began trading in 1864 at the Atlas Engine Works, St. George, Bristol, as Fox, Walker and Company, building four and six-coupled saddle tank engines for industrial use. They also built stationary engines and pioneered steam tramcars, the first being tested in Bristol in 1877.

Much of their output was exported, mostly 0-6-0, with some 0-4-0, 2-4-0 and 0-4-2. In 1878 they produced six 18 in (457 mm) gauge 2-4-2 trench engines for the Royal Engineers at Chatham using Henry Handyside's steep gradient apparatus. They also produced nine 0-6-0STs for the Somerset and Dorset Railway.

== Peckett and Sons ==
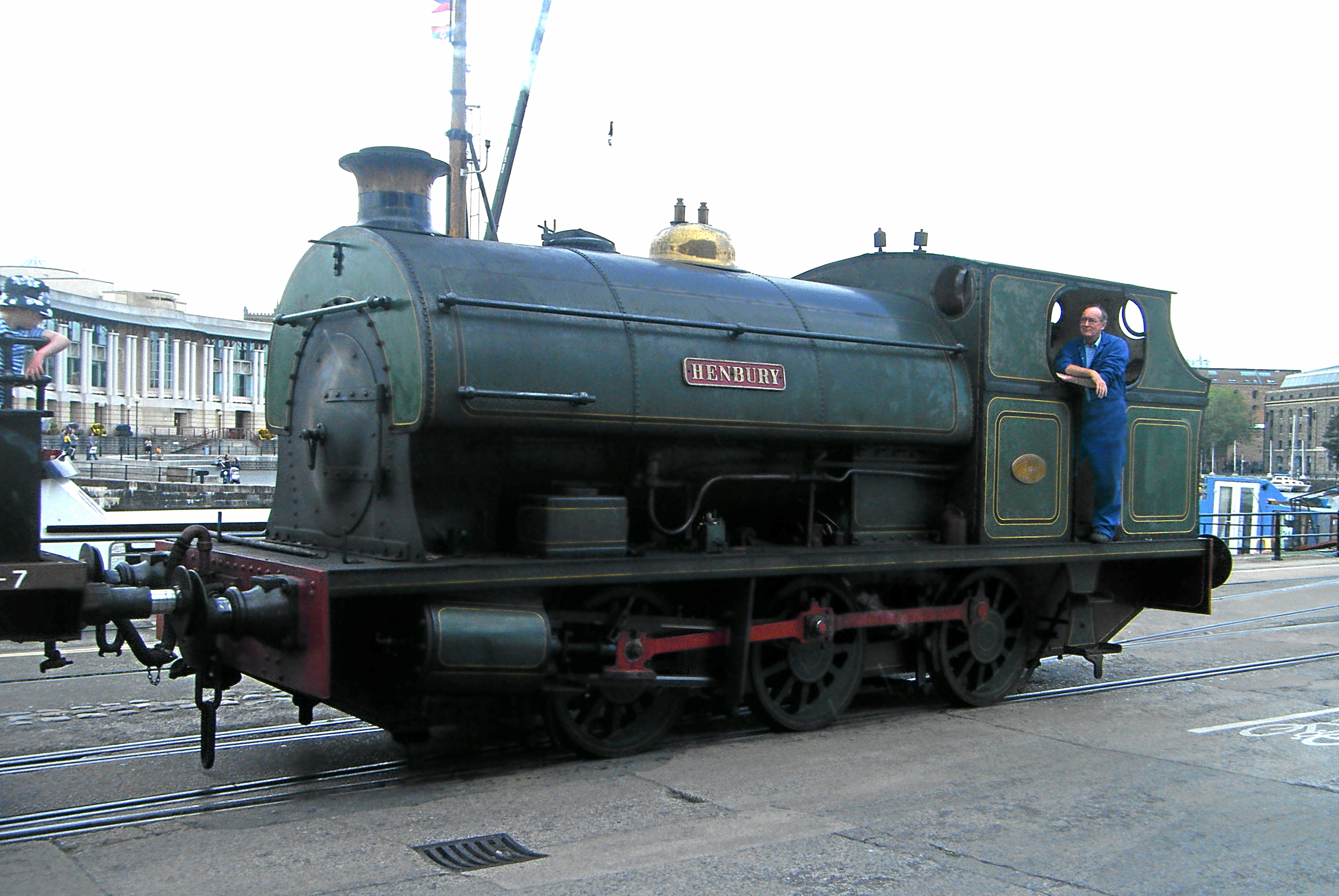
A larger 0-6-0ST locomotive, Henbury of 1937 at the Bristol Industrial Museum

They were taken over by Thomas Peckett in 1880, becoming Peckett and Sons, Atlas Engine Works, Bristol. The company acquired limited liability some years later. By 1900 the two companies had built over 400 locomotives.

The company continued producing a variety of small industrial and shunting engines at their factory located between Fishponds and Kingswood in Bristol. They became specialists in the field, with very precise specifications and standardisation of parts. The largest engine was an 0-8-0 built in 1931 for the Christmas Island Phosphate Company. The works were served by a branch line starting just south west of Kingswood junction on the Midland line and ran for about 1 mile (1.6 km) in a generally eastward direction. It also served some collieries in the Speedwell area. The only evidence remaining of this line is a bridge abutment on Whitefield Road.

During the two World Wars, the works were especially busy, but by 1950 trade had largely dried up. Although in 1956 an attempt had been made to enter the diesel-mechanical market, the last steam engine was produced in 1958 and the company was taken over by Reed Crane & Hoist Co Ltd on 23 October 1961, which itself later went into liquidation.

== Production and preservation ==
Despite hard work and poor maintenance, the engines were long-lasting. Many Peckett locomotives survive working on today's heritage railways around the world.

- The last Peckett steam locomotive built, 2165 of 1958, is preserved at Sandstone Estates, South Africa
- The oldest surviving Fox Walker locomotive is "Karlskoga", an 0-6-0ST of 1873 and the first locomotive of the Nora Bergslags Railway in Sweden. It was steamed at Nora, Sweden in 1982.
