= Bishops Castle Railway =

English railway company

The Bishop's Castle Railway was a railway company that constructed a railway line in Shropshire, from near Craven Arms to Bishop's Castle. It opened in 1866 but was continuously short of money, and was unable to complete its originally-planned route, nor to provide more than the most basic level of equipment. It closed due to bankruptcy in 1935.

== Origin ==
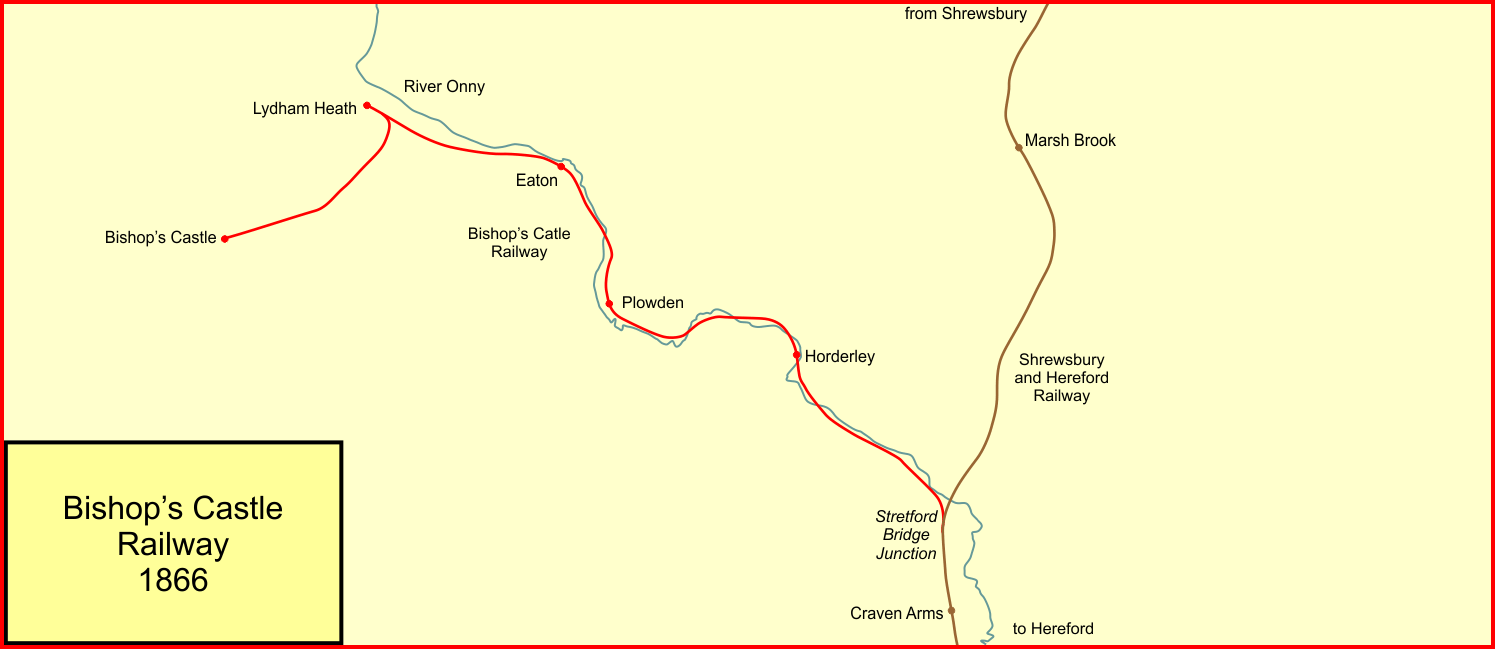
Bishop's Castle Railway

Bishop's Castle is a small town located in Shropshire near the border with Montgomeryshire, now Powys. Its population in the middle decades of the nineteenth century was about 2,000. The town had been on the route of a proposed trunk line to Porth Dinllaen, which was seen as a packet port for Ireland at one time, but that scheme had come to nothing.

To the east the Shrewsbury and Hereford Railway had opened its main line in 1852; there was a station at Craven Arms, named after a nearby inn that had been a staging post for the coaches. To the west, lay the Oswestry and Newtown Railway, which was promoted in 1859: its main purpose was to connect a group of small railways at Newtown with the English railway network, by way of Oswestry. The O&NR had a Montgomery station, but it was two miles from the town it served. That part of the line opened in 1862.

At this time it had become clear that rural towns that were not connected to a railway would suffer economically, as necessities brought in, and manufactures and agricultural products sent out, were expensive to transport by other means. Accordingly the idea developed of a railway branch line from the Craven Arms station to a point on the O&NR near Montgomery, serving the town and intermediate areas. From a junction at Wistanstow near Craven Arms, this would run through Lydham and join the O&NR north of Montgomery station, near the bridge over the River Camlad. The town of Montgomery is on a hill, and the route of the proposed railway could not be made close to the town; a short branch line to it would be built. There would also be a branch from Lydham to Bishop's Castle.

Bishop's Castle Railway Act 1861 (Note: Section 1.)
- Act of Parliament
- Parliament of the United Kingdom
- Long title: An Act for making Railways from the Oswestry and Newtown Railway near Montgomery to Bishops Castle and other Places in the County of Salop.
- Citation: 24 & 25 Vict. c. ciii
- Territorial extent: United Kingdom

Dates
- Royal assent: 28 June 1861
- Commencement: 28 June 1861

Status: Current legislation

At public meetings locally, the scheme received enthusiastic support, and a parliamentary bill went forward; the railway was authorised by the Bishop's Castle Railway Act 1861 (24 & 25 Vict. c. ciii), on 28 June 1861. Authorised share capital was £180,000, to build 19 1/4 miles of line.

There was dismay when the scheme was published, for it was then seen that Bishop's Castle was planned to be on a branch and not the main line. The Shrewsbury Chronicle commented, "The railway is a misnomer, for Bishop's Castle will never enjoy much, if any, of its vast benefits". As a result of local feeling, the Committee of the House of Commons introduced a clause in the Railway Bill requiring that a branch from Lydham Heath to Bishop's Castle must be opened concurrently with the main line.

== Construction and opening ==
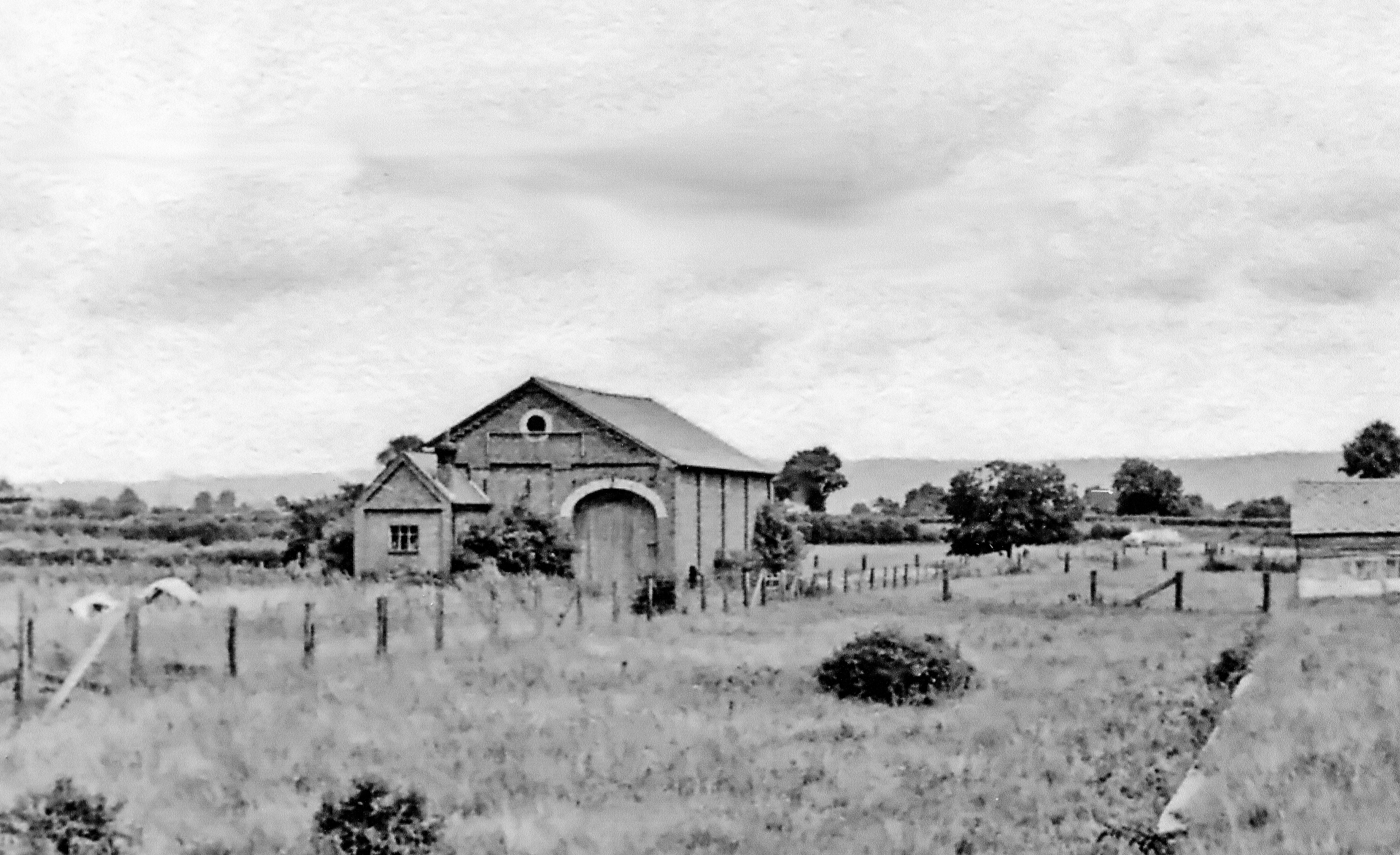
Remains of station buildings at Bishop's Castle in 1951

A contractor was appointed, and he stated that he would start work as soon as a proportion of the share capital had been actually subscribed. This proved extremely difficult and for a considerable time no work was started, due to the absence of share subscriptions. It was not until 1865 that work was begun, by another contractor, and the part of the line from Craven Arms to Lydham and Bishop's Castle was opened on 1 February 1866. The line formed a Y shape, as trains ran from Craven Arms to Lydham and reversed to reach Bishop's Castle. Much of the route followed the River Onny.

The first commercial use of the line was actually on 27 January 1866, when a special train was provided for the Squire of Plowden for his shooting party.

However Oppitz says that the Bishop's Castle branch from Lydham was used [for passenger purposes] from October 1865 without waiting for the approval of the Government Inspector.

== Expansion plans ==
Bishop's Castle Railway (Further Powers) Act 1865
- Act of Parliament
- Parliament of the United Kingdom
- Long title: An Act to authorize the Bishop's Castle Railway Company to extend their Railway to the Minsterley Branch of the Shrewsbury and Welshpool Railway in Shropshire; and for other Purposes.
- Citation: 28 & 29 Vict. c. clxxiii
- Territorial extent: United Kingdom

Dates
- Royal assent: 29 June 1865
- Commencement: 29 June 1865

Status: Current legislation

Text of statute as originally enacted

Notwithstanding the failure to complete the line, the directors now started to plan an extension line, to Minsterley. The topography was helpful for such a line, as low-lying land around the Aylesford Brook and the Rea Brook led from Chirbury (on the proposed Montgomery line) to Minsterley; there was already a branch line terminus there, connecting with Shrewsbury. The Bishop's Castle Railway (Further Powers) Act 1865 (28 & 29 Vict. c. clxxiii) authorising this extension was granted on 29 June 1865.

Now the money market turned against railway projects in the financial Panic of 1866 and it became impossible to get finance. Moreover the ordinary trading of the company was disappointing, and it fell into the hands of a receiver in Court of Chancery. Completion of the original line from Lydham to Montgomery was obviously impossible.

== Working the line ==
The company had two locomotives, and operated one at a time, so that the operating system was “one engine in steam”. There was no electric telegraph or block working, and therefore no communication for train control. There were three train services each way daily with an additional one on cattle-fair days. There were several passenger coaches, although three were normally used on service trains; they were four-wheelers, using the obsolescent chain brake system.

== Receivership and temporary closure ==
The railway was always heavily in debt, and on 27 February 1877 possession some of the land on which the railway ran was taken by authority of the Court of Chancery, due to unpaid debts. The line was closed until 2 July 1877 when the sum of £700 was paid in to court and the seizure was cancelled. The money was raised by a sale and leaseback of a locomotive and some land, to local persons.

Most of the press simply said that the line was 'stopped' during this period; however the Wellington Journal (a newspaper) said that a service was continuing between Horderley and Bishops Castle, with Mr Scriven, a hotel proprietor, providing a wagonnette service from Craven Arms to Horderley. The suspension of through goods trains was considered to have had a marked adverse effect on the price of coal in Bishop's Castle.

== Another attempt to reach Montgomery ==
Bishop's Castle and Montgomery Railway Act 1884
- Act of Parliament
- Parliament of the United Kingdom
- Long title: An Act to authorise the Construction of a Railway from the Bishop's Castle Railway at Lydham in the County of Salop to Montgomery in the County of Montgomery.
- Citation: 47 & 48 Vict. c. ccxxi
- Territorial extent: United Kingdom

Dates
- Royal assent: 7 August 1884
- Commencement: 7 August 1884
- Repealed: 5 July 1887

Other legislation
- Repealed by: Bishop's Castle and Montgomery Railway (Abandonment) Act 1887

Status: Repealed

Text of statute as originally enacted

Bishop's Castle and Montgomery Railway (Abandonment) Act 1887
- Act of Parliament
- Parliament of the United Kingdom
- Long title: An Act for the abandonment of the Bishop's Castle and Montgomery Railway.
- Citation: 50 & 51 Vict. c. lxviii
- Territorial extent: United Kingdom

Dates
- Royal assent: 5 July 1887
- Commencement: 5 July 1887
- Repealed: 31 January 2013

Other legislation
- Repeals/revokes: Bishop's Castle and Montgomery Railway Act 1884
- Repealed by: Statute Law (Repeals) Act 2013

Status: Repealed

Text of statute as originally enacted

Not to be deterred the company's supporters promoted a further scheme in 1883 to extend the line from Lydham Heath to Montgomery. They obtained an authorising act of Parliament, the Bishop's Castle and Montgomery Railway Act 1884 (47 & 48 Vict. c. ccxxi), on 7 August 1884, incorporating the Bishop's Castle and Montgomery Railway, but once again local support in the form of share subscriptions was absent, and the scheme never progressed. It was abandoned by a further act of Parliament, the Bishop's Castle and Montgomery Railway (Abandonment) Act 1887(50 & 51 Vict. c. lxviii) of 5 July 1887.

== Washout in 1886 ==
There was severe flooding in the district in 1886 and the line was breached by a washout at Plowden on 13 May 1886. For a few weeks the traffic was worked from each end and passengers were conveyed past the gap in horse brakes.

== A final plea to the GWR ==
On 1 January 1922, the Cambrian Railways, owners of the Oswestry and Newtown line at Montgomery, joined the Great Western Railway as part of the grouping of the railways. Craven Arms was also a Great Western station (jointly with the London and North Western Railway, shortly to be the London, Midland and Scottish Railway). The Bishop's Castle Railway tried to persuade the GWR to build the Lydham Heath to Montgomery line, so forming a through link between the two main lines. If that were done the Bishop's Castle might sell its line to the GWR. The GWR immediately made it plain that it was not interested in such a development. Evidently Montgomery Town Council had been lobbying for such a scheme–the "Montgomery" station on the Cambrian Line was some distance from the town; however in June 1924, the Ministry of Transport indicated that a Government grant was not a possibility.

== Closure ==
For decades the company had struggled to continue in business while in receivership. The financial state of the company was worsening as road transport in rural areas began to expand, and the Receivership was terminated in April 1935: the business was closed down and the line now ceased to operate. The track was removed in 1937 and the land was gradually sold privately.

== Locomotives used on the line ==
- Bee, 0-4-0ST, ex-Benjamin Piercy (contractor), built by Brotherhoods of Chippenham in 1865
- Plowden, 0-6-0, ex-St. Helens Railway, builder unknown, but possibly E. Bury & Co.
- Perseverance, 0-4-2T, ex-Great Western Railway No. 227, built as 0-4-0T by Dodds, Isaac and Son in 1854
- Progress, 2-4-0, ex-Somerset and Dorset Joint Railway, built by George England and Co. in 1861
- Bishops Castle, 2-4-0, ex-Somerset and Dorset Joint Railway, built by George England and Co. in 1861
- No.1, 0-4-2T, ex-Great Western Railway No. 567, built at Wolverhampton railway works in 1869
- Carlisle, 0-6-0, ex-Thomas Nelson (contractor) of Carlisle, built as 0-6-0ST by Kitson and Company in 1868.

== Stations ==
- Bishops Castle Junction or Stretford Bridge Junction on the Shrewsbury and Hereford Railway;
- Stretford Bridge Junction Halt; opened May 1890; closed 20 April 1935;
- Horderley: opened March 1866; closed 20 April 1935;
- Plowden; opened 1 February 1866; closed 20 April 1935;
- Eaton; opened March 1866; closed 20 April 1935;
- Lydham Heath; opened 1 February 1866; closed 20 April 1935;
- Bishop’s Castle; opened 1 February 1866; closed 20 April 1935.

== Bishop's Castle Railway Society ==
The Bishop's Castle Railway Society hopes to preserve remaining artefacts from the railway.
