= Victorian Railways J class =

Victorian Railways J class may refer to:

- Victorian Railways J class (1859)
- Victorian Railways J class (1954)
