= Victorian Railways No.1 (1857) =

Class of Australian 2-2-2 steam locomotive

Victorian Railways No. 1
- VR No. 1 captured in 1913.
Type and origin
- Power type: Steam
- Builder: George England and Co., Newcastle upon Tyne, UK
- Serial number: 146
- Build date: 1857
- Total produced: 1
- Rebuild date: c.1871
- Number rebuilt: 1
Specifications
- Configuration
  - Whyte: 2-2-2; Rebuilt 1871: 2-4-0
- Gauge: 5 ft 3 in (1,600 mm) Victorian broad gauge
- Leading dia.: Unknown
- Driver dia.: 6 ft 6 in (1,980 mm); Rebuilt 1871: 5 ft 0 in (1,520 mm)
- Trailing dia.: Unknown; Rebuilt 1871: N/A
- Tender wheels: Unknown
- Water cap.: 1,200 imp gal (5,500 L; 1,400 US gal)
- Cylinders: 2
- Cylinder size: 14 in × 22 in (356 mm × 559 mm)
Career
- Operators: Victorian Railways
- Number in class: 1
- Numbers: 1, 1860: 12, 1893: 528
- Delivered: 1858
- First run: 16 September 1858
- Last run: 15 April 1904 (45.6 years)
- Withdrawn: 1904
- Disposition: To South Australia, later scrapped

The Victorian Railways No. 1 was the first government passenger steam locomotive on Victorian Railways. It was a 2-2-2 (later 2-4-0) passenger locomotive operated by the Victorian Railways between 1858 and 1890 and again between 1893 and 1904, built by George England and Co., Newcastle upon Tyne, England.

== History ==
Victorian Railways initially numbered passenger and goods locomotives separately. The passenger engine was numbered 1 (the first goods engine was also numbered 1). This was changed to consecutive numbering between June 1859 and March 1860 with the goods locos being numbers 2–5. With the introduction of the J class in 1860, to avoid confusion these were temporarily altered to 1A (and 2A–5A for the goods locos). The numbering was once again changed in the late 1860's to odd numbers for goods locomotives and even numbers for passenger locos with this locomotive taking number 12. In the 1886 classification system, No. 12 remained unclassified

=== Production ===
This locomotive was built by George England and Co. in 1857 with builder's numbers 146 at a cost of £2200, +£900 freight and insurance, and arrived in Port Phillip on 12 May 1858 along with 0-6-0 goods locomotive No. 1.

=== Regular service ===
This small 2-2-2 passenger locomotive was quite successful over the easier runs on the first government lines, which resulted in five similar locomotives being introduced in 1860. Between 5 July 1895 and 20 March 1896 it was leased to Altona Bay Estate Co. Later it used for a short time at Box Hill Brick Works, and then a short time as a shunter at Geelong.

=== Design improvements ===
In about 1871 it was rebuilt to 2-4-0 wheel arrangement to improve adhesion and allow greater tractive effort to cope with heavier loads and steeper gradients on the new routes.
Over the years it was fitted with various alterations to the cab. There were also various upgrades over the years; with constant improvements to safety — these including things like updates to safety valves (and domes), smokeboxs and chimneys (with spark arrestors), and brakes.

=== Demise ===
In May 1890, No. 12 was sold to Shire of Yarrawonga for their Katamatite Tramway where it was used until December 1892, it was then bought back in July 1893 and renumbered 528, as another locomotive had already received that number in the meantime.
It was once again withdrawn on 15 April 1904, and sold to Mr Pearman for Rowden & Baxter for £400 and was sent to Outer Harbor, South Australia — where it remained for the remainder of its life, first in construction work then from 1908 as a shunter loco until finally being broken up c. 1910 (53 years after construction).

== Fleet summary ==
Key:	In service	Preserved	Stored or withdrawn	Scrapped

Locomotive	Previous numbers	Builder no.	Entered service	Withdrawn	Scrapped	Status	Notes
12	1, 1A	146	January 1859	May 1890		-	Sold to Shire of Yarrawonga for Katamatite tramway - May 1890
528	(ex No 12)	146	July 1893	15 April 1904		Sold	Leased to Altona Bay Estate Co. - 5 July 1895 to 20 March 1896. Sold to Mr Pearman for Rowden & Baxter (£400) - 1904. To Outer Harbour, SA
