= George England and Co. =

English manufacturer of steam locomotives

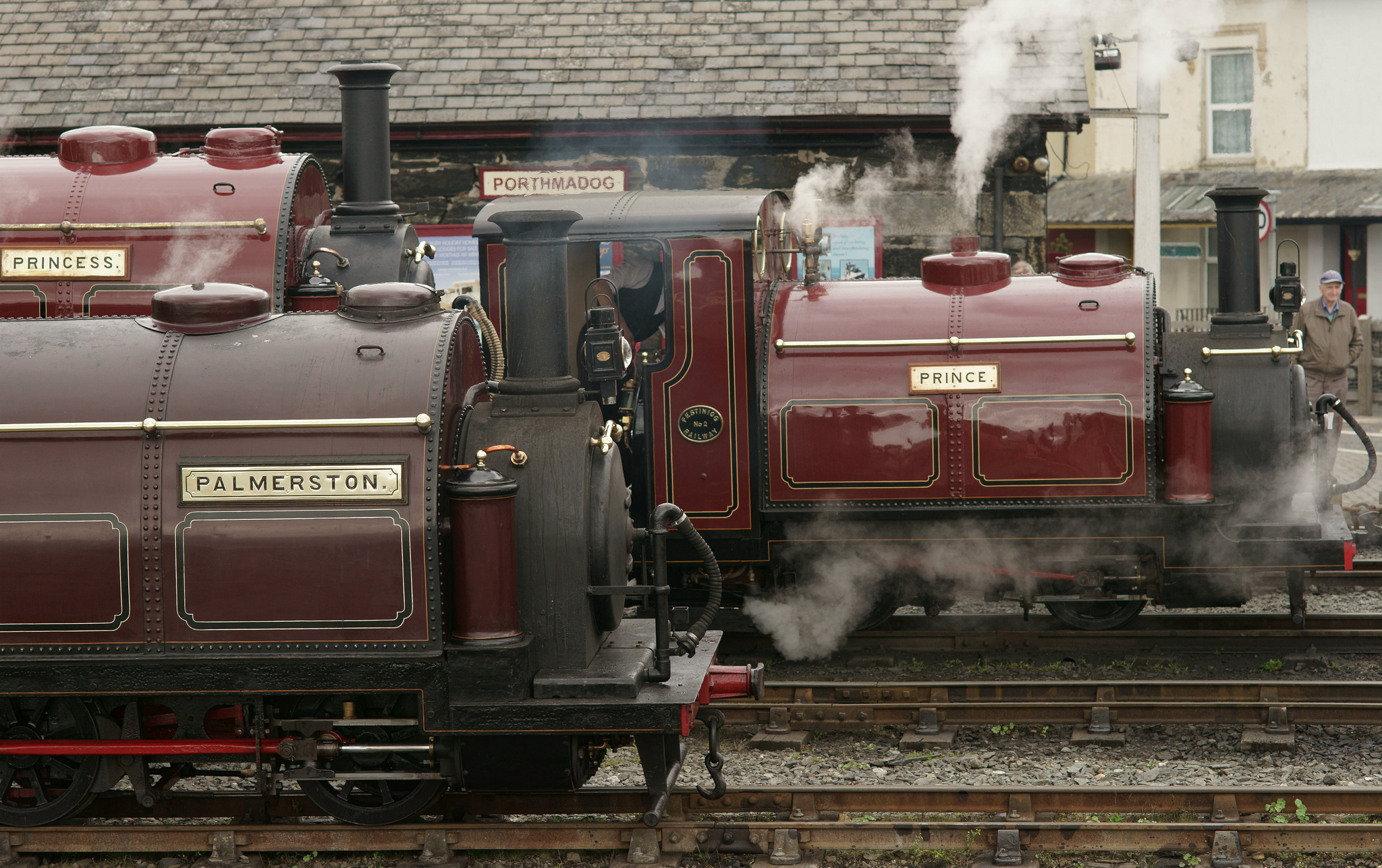
- Three George England locomotives on the Ffestiniog Railway
- Company type: Ltd
- Industry: Engineering
- Founded: 1839
- Defunct: 1869
- Fate: Taken over
- Successor: Fairlie Engine & Steam Carriage Co.
- Headquarters: Hatcham, New Cross
- Key people: George England, Robert Francis Fairlie
- Products: Steam locomotives

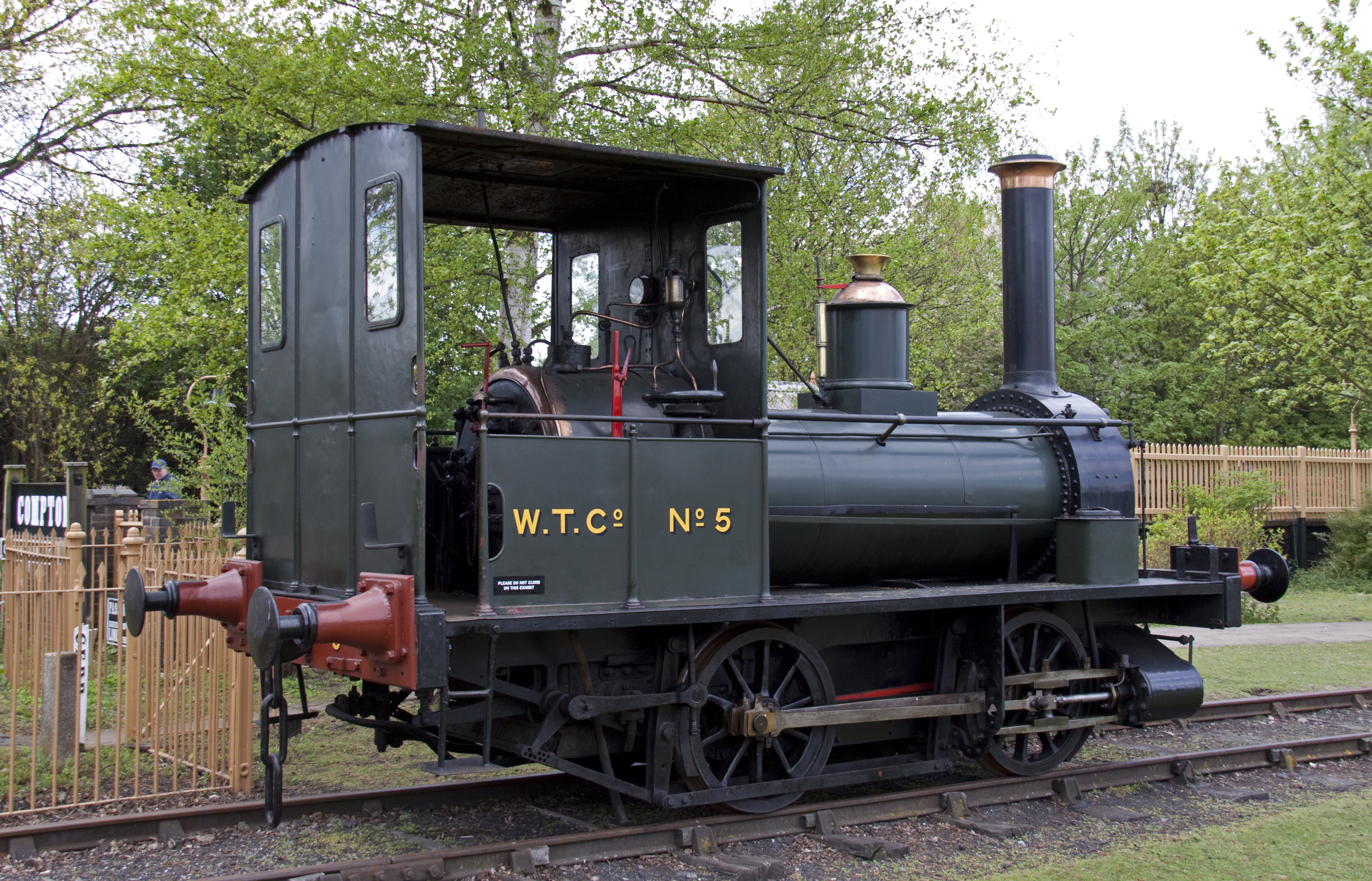
Wantage Tramway No.5, built by George England in 1857, preserved at Didcot Railway Centre

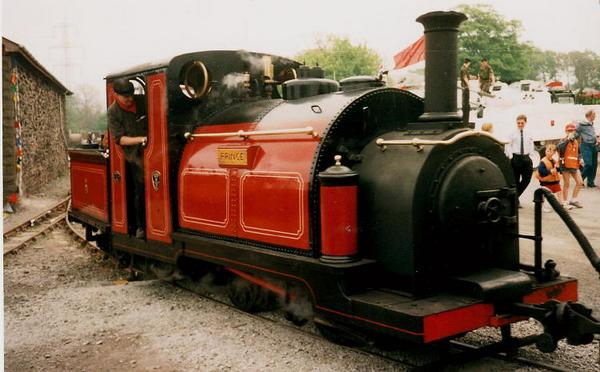
Prince built 1863, still running

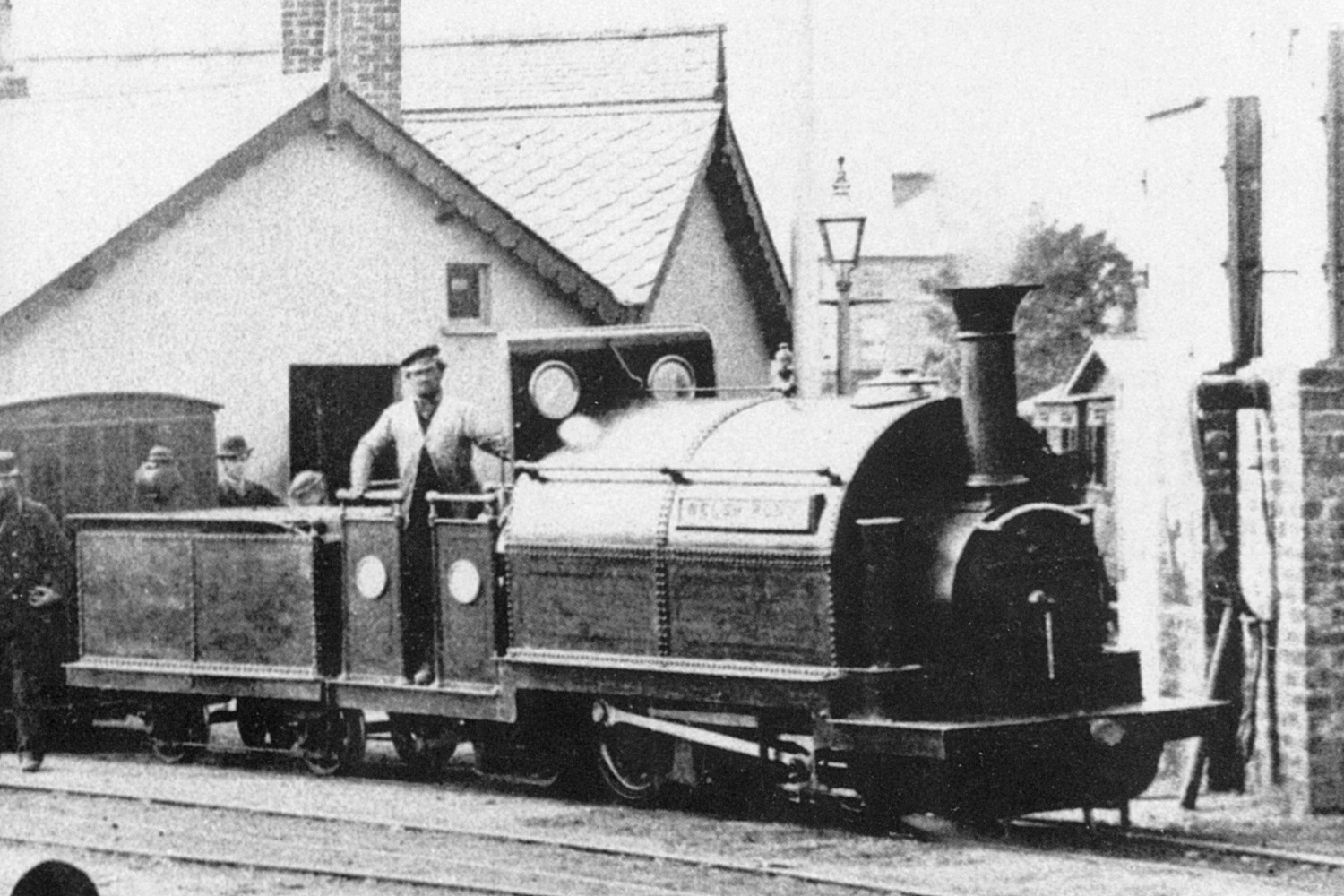
Welsh Pony as built 1867

George England and Co. was an early English manufacturer of steam locomotives founded by the engineer George England of Newcastle upon Tyne (1811–1878). The company operated from the Hatcham Iron Works in New Cross, Surrey, and began building locomotives in 1848.

The company supplied one of the earliest tank locomotives to the contractors building the Newhaven, Sussex, branch line for the London Brighton and South Coast Railway and exhibited a design at The Great Exhibition in 1851. It also supplied locomotives to the Ffestiniog Railway, the Wantage Tramway, the Caledonian Railway, the London & Blackwall Railway, the Great Western Railway, the Somerset and Dorset Railway and the Victorian Railways amongst others.

== Locomotive types ==
=== Festiniog Railway 0-4-0 ===
The four locomotives supplied by England, in 1863/64, to the Festiniog Railway, were the first truly successful narrow gauge 1 ft 11 1/2 in (597 mm) engines built. Remarkably three of the four survive, much rebuilt, two still in full working order. The other, Princess, was for many years on display at Spooner's Bar in Porthmadog, although without its tender. It has since been restored cosmetically to a high standard, and has made appearances in London and elsewhere for publicity purposes.

Two more similar 0-4-0ST engines, to an improved design, were built in 1867, one of which, Welsh Pony, survives, and bought back to steam on the 27th of June 2020 after having undergone a careful and sympathetic restoration by the Ffestiniog Railway.

A replica of 'Mountaineer' (not to be confused with the ALCO locomotive of the same name also currently being rebuilt on the Ffestiniog), which was one of the original four small Englands, is currently being built and aims to recreate as closely as possible what they would have been like when they arrived at the Ffestiniog in 1863. This project is very close to completion as of 2025.

=== Fairlie ===
In 1869, England built the famous Little Wonder, Fairlie's Patent articulated locomotive, also for the Ffestiniog Railway. George England's daughter, Eliza Anne, had earlier eloped with Robert Francis Fairlie, the inventor of the Fairlie locomotive. On George England's early retirement in 1869, Fairlie took over the company, in partnership with England's son George England junior, renaming it the Fairlie Engine and Steam Carriage Company, but following the death of George England Jr., in July 1870, the works were sold.

=== Victoria, Australia ===
- 2-2-2 - Victorian Railways No.1 (1857)
- 0-6-0 - Victorian Railways V class (1857)
- 2-4-0T - Melbourne and Suburban Railway Company 2-4-0T (1860)
- 2-4-0ST - Victorian Railways L class (1859)

== Preservation ==
- Wantage Tramway, Shannon, 0-4-0WT, preserved at Didcot Railway Centre
- Ffestiniog Railway, see: Ffestiniog Railway rolling stock
