= List of Ffestiniog Railway rolling stock =

The Ffestiniog Railway owns and operates a number of heritage and modern-day steam and diesel locomotives. A full list of these locomotives with details of their operational status is provided below.

== Locomotives ==
The list includes past locomotives and present locomotives that are owned by, or permanently housed at, the Ffestiniog Railway:

=== Steam locomotives ===
Number	Name	Image	Whyte type	Date built	Date scrapped	Builder	Class	Notes	Available for Service
1	Princess		0-4-0ST+T	1863	n/a	George England and Co.	Small England	One of the first two delivered in July 1863 and the first to be steamed. It was also the last to be used before the line closed in 1946. Restored cosmetically for the 150th anniversary of steam on the railway in 2013. Visited Kings Cross Station in February 2016	No
2	Prince		0-4-0ST+T	1863	n/a	George England and Co.	Small England	The oldest operable Ffestiniog Railway steam locomotive. Returned to service in time for the 150th anniversary of steam on the railway in 2013. Went out of service in 2023 for its 10-yearly overhaul	Yes
3 (1)	Mountaineer		0-4-0T+T	1863	1879	George England and Co.	Small England	The first locomotive delivered to the Ffestiniog railway. Delivered as a side tank locomotive and the only one of the George England locomotives never to carry a saddle tank. Dismantled in 1879 when it was considered to be worn out. Some parts were donated to the other George England locomotives.	No
4	Palmerston		0-4-0ST+T	1864	n/a	George England and Co.	Small England	Restored to service in 1993 after many years out of use, including a period when used as a stationary boiler at Boston Lodge. Returned to service in 2015 following its annual ten-yearly overhaul.	Yes
5	Welsh Pony		0-4-0ST+T	1867	n/a	George England and Co.	Large England	Welsh Pony was the first of the Large England class, being delivered in July 1867. It ran until February 1940. It was cosmetically restored for the Ffestiniog Railway's Steam 150 event in May 2013. It has since been restored to full working order; its first run after restoration was on 27 June 2020. New inner frames, new cylinders, and a new boiler were fitted, with older parts fitted back around these core items.	Yes
6	Little Giant		0-4-0ST+T	August 1867	1929	George England and Co.	Large England	Works number 235. Single slide-bar replaced in 1868. Rebuilt in 1887 with a new boiler. New steel frames fitted in 1890. D-shaped smokebox fitted in 1893. Extensively rebuilt with a new boiler in 1904. Overhauled in 1920, but condemned in 1929 and boiler fitted to Palmerston in 1933.	No
7 (1)	Little Wonder		0-4-4-0T	1869	1882	George England and Co.	Double Fairlie	Scrapped 1882. First Fairlie locomotive built for the Ffestiniog Railway.	No
8 (1)	James Spooner		0-4-4-0T	1872	1930	Avonside Engine Co.	Double Fairlie	Built by Avonside Engine Co. to G.P.Spooner's design, it was first recorded as running in December 1872. It was last rebuilt with a wagon-top boiler in 1908. Last steamed in 1928 and dismantled for boiler work, before being condemned in 1930.	No
8 (2)	James Spooner		0-4-4-0T	2023	n/a	Boston Lodge	Double Fairlie	On completion became the most recent Double Fairlie locomotive in the world. Announcement of replacement locomotive carrying this name and number made by FRCo in March 2016. Locomotive completed in 2023.	Yes
9 (1)/7 (2)	Taliesin		0-4-4T	1876/ 1999	1924	Vulcan Foundry/ Boston Lodge	Single Fairlie	Replica Single Fairlie locomotive built at Boston Lodge works in 1999. The original 1876-built locomotive was condemned in 1924. The replica used a few parts from the original (therefore making it a rebuild) but was largely built from scratch. Named after the 6th century Welsh poet Taliesin. Having been built for easy conversion between oil and coal firing, the locomotive has been coal-fired since 2007. In service and usually found on low season trains. Fitted with piston valves and boiler pressure increased to 200 psi in 2011.	Yes
10	Merddin Emrys		0-4-4-0T	1879	n/a	Boston Lodge	Double Fairlie	The first Double Fairlie to be built at Boston Lodge Works. The oldest operating Double Fairlie on the railway. Named after the 6th century Welsh poet. The locomotive underwent a major rebuild in 1987/8. Returned to steam in 2005 and converted to coal firing during the winter of 2006/2007. Returned to service in 2016 following an annual ten-yearly overhaul.	Yes
11 (1)/3 (2)	Livingston Thompson		0-4-4-0T	1885	n/a	Boston Lodge	Double Fairlie	Withdrawn 1971 and restored 1988 as a static display at the National Railway Museum in York. Named Taliesin II from 1932 until 1961, when it was renamed Earl of Merioneth. In 1988 its original name was restored after Earl of Merioneth II had been built.	No
11 (2)	Earl of Merioneth II		0-4-4-0T	1979	n/a	Boston Lodge	Double Fairlie	The first Double Fairlie built by the restored Ffestiniog Railway, and the only one of its kind to deviate from the classic design with the cuboid side tanks. Converted to coal firing in 2006. Her final date in service was on Sun 8 April 2018 prior to the expiry of her boiler ticket. The loco requires a new boiler, boiler cradle, smokeboxes, chimneys and water tanks. Its current power bogies are to be overhauled for use on newbuild double Fairlie "James Spooner", it will however be re-united with its original power bogies so that a future overhaul is not deferred.	No
12	David Lloyd George		0-4-4-0T	1992	n/a	Boston Lodge	Double Fairlie	The second-most recent Double Fairlie locomotive in the world and also the most powerful locomotive on the railway. Named after the Welsh statesman. Originally built to burn oil rather than coal. Returned to service in May 2014 following overhaul, fitting of new power bogies and conversion to coal firing.	Yes
-	Blanche		2-4-0ST+T	1893	n/a	Hunslet Engine Co.	Penrhyn Mainline Hunslet	Originally an 0-4-0ST running on the Penrhyn Quarry Railway, purchased by the Festiniog Railway in 1963. Rebuilt as 2-4-0ST+T in 1972, with the pony truck from Moel Tryfan, an engine used on the original Welsh Highland Railway. Received a new boiler in 2003. A ten-yearly overhaul was completed in December 2017.	Yes
-	Linda		2-4-0ST+T	1893	n/a	Hunslet Engine Co.	Penrhyn Mainline Hunslet	Originally an 0-4-0ST running on the Penrhyn Quarry Railway, hired by the Ffestiniog Railway in 1962, and purchased in December 1963. Named after Linda Blanche Douglas-Pennant. Returned to service in 2011 after a lengthy seven-year overhaul. Withdrawn for an extensive overhaul in 2021. Repainting was completed in January 2024.	Yes
-	Mountaineer II		2-6-2T	1917	n/a	ALCO	British War Department Light Railways 2-6-2T	Built for the British Army's use in World War I; later ran on the Tramway de Pithiviers à Toury in France; purchased by a supporter of the Festiniog Railway in 1967. A regular performer for four decades, the locomotive last operated in 2006 and is currently awaiting overhaul. Scoping of overhaul currently underway and work expected to start when Welsh Pony is completed.	No
-	Britomart		0-4-0ST	1899	n/a	Hunslet Engine Co.	Quarry Hunslet	Used as a shunting engine around Boston Lodge and Harbour station; occasionally ventures up the line for specials and footplate rides at Tan-y-bwlch and Blaenau stations during special events. A ten-yearly overhaul was completed in 2017.	Yes
-	Lilla		0-4-0ST	1891	n/a	Hunslet Engine Co.	Large Hunslet	Originally built for Cilgwyn Quarry and transferred to Penrhyn Quarry in 1921 Lilla is a unique loco. Saved for preservation by Bernard Latham. New boiler built at Boston Lodge and fitted in 2008. Supported by group of volunteers. Underwent an overhaul in 2019.	Yes
-	Hugh Napier		0-4-0ST	1904	n/a	Hunslet Engine Co.	Quarry Hunslet	Owned by the National Trust. On long-term loan to Ffestiniog Railway Company and supported by volunteer team. Ten-yearly overhaul completed in 2020.	Yes
14	Lyd		2-6-2T	2010	n/a	Boston Lodge	Lynton and Barnstaple Manning Wardle	Built at Boston Lodge works as a replica of the Manning Wardle locomotive Lew built for the Lynton and Barnstaple Railway in 1925. Sister locomotives were scrapped in 1935 (Lew itself was shipped to Brazil and its subsequent fate remains a mystery). Lyd entered traffic in 2010 wearing unlined black livery before being turned out in lined BR black livery in 2011. In 2012 it was repainted into a Southern Railway livery. First ten-yearly overhaul completed June 2021.	Yes
-	Dahuichang 4		0-8-0	1988	n/a	Harbin Works	China Railways C2	Privately purchased in 2006, now in purpose built workshop and actively being restored at Boston Lodge. One of the world's last commercially built narrow gauge steam locomotives for industrial use. Re-gauged from 30" to 1 ft 11.5 ". This is not yet classified as an FR loco.	No

=== Diesel locomotives ===
Name	Image	Type	Built	Builder	Notes
Mary Ann		4wDM	1917	Motor Rail	The first locomotive to work the revived Ffestiniog Railway in 1954. Built for British Army use in WWI and bought by the Ffestiniog Railway in 1923. Returned to operation in 2004 following a rebuild. In 2016 it received a cab roof so as to represent its World War I appearance.
Moelwyn		2-4-0DM	1918	Baldwin	Another ex-WWI locomotive, purchased by the Ffestiniog Railway in 1925. Originally an 0-4-0 but was extensively modified in the 1950s and 1960s with a new diesel engine, frame extensions and carrier wheels in order to improve its running. Received heavy overhauls in 1998 and 2009 and is mainly used as a yard shunter at Boston Lodge. Painted into World War I grey for the first time in preservation in 2016.
Alistair		4wDM	1940	Ruston and Hornsby	An 11/13 hp model, works number. Purchased from the Smallford Depot of Bierrum & Partners Ltd. on 27 February 1968, after an appeal by Dan Wilson in Country Life magazine. It was used on the construction of the Deviation and to transport the Tan y Bwlch Station Master John Harrison. It was sold to the Gartell Light Railway in 1991. In 2016, it was operating at Bursledon Brickworks Museum.
Upnor Castle		4wDM	1954	F.C. Hibberd	Built for the Chattenden and Upnor Railway to 2 ft 6 in (0.76 m) gauge, bought from the Welshpool and Llanfair Light Railway in 1968. Now in use on the Welsh Highland Railway.
Moel Hebog		4wDM	1955	Hunslet Engine Co.	Originally built for the National Coal Board as a flameproof mines locomotive. Purchased in 1969 and mainly used for permanent way maintenance trains.
Conway Castle/Castell Conwy		4wDM	1958	F.C. Hibberd	Built for the Admiralty's line at Ernesettle, purchased in 1981. Now in use at the Welsh Highland Railway. Bilingually named.
Ashover		4wDM	1948	F.C. Hibberd	Built for the Ashover Light Railway and purchased by the Ffestiniog Railway in 1981.
The Lady Diana		4wDM	1957	Motor Rail	Purchased by the Ffestiniog Railway in 1974.
The Colonel		4wDM	1943	Motor Rail	Built for the St. Albans Sand and Gravel Company, purchased by Colonel Campbell of Dduallt Manor for his private use on the Ffestiniog Railway. Purchased by the railway in 1982.
Criccieth Castle/Castell Criccieth		0-6-0DM	1995	Boston Lodge	Built by the railway from parts supplied by Baguley-Drewry. Used on passenger services. Bilingually named.
Harlech Castle/Castell Harlech		0-6-0DM	1983	Baguley-Drewry	Built for service in Mozambique, but purchased by the Ffestiniog Railway in 1988 after the order was cancelled. Used as an engineering locomotive and primarily stationed at Minffordd. Bilingually named.
Harold		4wDM	1979	Hunslet Engine Co.	Built for the railway at North Bierley sewage farm and bought by the Ffestiniog in the early 1990s.
Vale of Ffestiniog		B-Bd	1967	CH Funkey & Co (Pty) Ltd	Built for the Eastern Province Cement Company in Port Elizabeth, South Africa, purchased by the Ffestiniog Railway in 1996 and extensively rebuilt. Used for passenger services. The twin of 'Castell Caernarfon' on the Welsh Highland Railway
Moel-Y-Gest		4wDM	1965	Hunslet Engine Co.	Built for the Royal Naval Armaments Depot at Dean Hill in Wiltshire. Purchased by the Ffestiniog Railway in 2004 and in use as a shunter at Boston Lodge.
Busta		4wDM		Fairbanks Morse	A platelayers trolley originally used by U.S. Army. Used on WHR as a platelayers trolley in the 1920s and 1930s.
Monster		4wDM		Boston Lodge	A diminutive diesel built by the North Staffordshire Group for the Ffestiniog Railway. Sold to Rich Morris in 1976, and subsequently displayed at Gloddfa Ganol. Returned to the FR, and restored in 2010.

=== Battery locomotives ===
Number	Name	Image	Whyte type	Date built	Date scrapped	Builder	Class	Notes	Available for Service
	Amp		4wBE	2013	n/a	Clayton	Tunnelling	Acquired from the Thames Tideway tunnelling project, entered service 2024	Yes
	Volt		4wBE	2013	n/a	Clayton	Tunnelling	Acquired from the Thames Tideway tunnelling project, entered service 2025	Yes

== Other rolling stock ==
For more detailed information on current and past rolling stock, visit the Railways own Heritage Group Wikipedia

These are the existing vehicles that are owned by or are permanently housed on the Ffestiniog Railway:-

=== Four-wheel passenger coaches and vans ===
The principal source of information for this table is the: "Rheilffordd Ffestiniog Railway Traveller's Guide" by the FR Company circa 2002, supplemented by later information as it becomes available.

Present Number	Date built	Builder	Compartments (from Blaenau end)	Number of seats	Image	Notes
1	1996	FR Boston Lodge Works	Semi-open knifeboard bench	14 (3rd)		Replica incorporating some original parts
2	1863/4	Brown, Marshalls and Co. Ltd.	Single compartment knifeboard seats	10 (1st)		Restored in 1958, rebuilt in 1992
3	1863/4	Brown Marshalls & Co. Birmingham	Single compartment knifeboard bench	14 (3rd)		Restored in 1960, rebuilt in 1996
4	1863/4	Brown Marshalls & Co. Birmingham	Single compartment knifeboard bench	14 (3rd)		Restored in 1958, rebuilt in 2000
5	1863/4	Brown Marshalls & Co. Birmingham	Single compartment knifeboard bench	14 (3rd)		Restored in 1958, rebuilt by Mr R.G. Jarvis in 1983
8	1885/6	FR Boston Lodge Works	Quarrymen's carriage single compartment	10 (3rd)		Restored in 1961, overhauled in 1988, fully rebuilt between 1991 and 1992
10	2007	FR Boston Lodge Works	Two-compartment 4-wheel 3rd.	12 (3rd)		Replica of an 1868 Ashbury 4-wheeler. The original was built as a First Class vehicle, but was downgraded to Third Class later in life. The replica has been constructed in this form, incorporating some parts from original Ashbury 4-wheelers.
(11)	1863/4	Brown Marshalls & Co. Birmingham	Fully open knifeboard bench	14 (3rd)		Rebuilt by the FR Society Midland Group to original condition - currently under overhaul to Victorian condition including replica leather aprons and awning. The current FR rulebook lists this carriage as number 11 but the carriage does not carry this number. It is most commonly referred to as 'the flying bench'.
12	2012	FR Boston Lodge Works	Semi-open knifeboard bench	14 (3rd)		Replica incorporating some original parts.
Van 6	1885/6	FR Boston Lodge Works	Single compartment brake 3rd.	6 (3rd)		Converted from third type quarrymen's coach (same as No. 8) circa 1930, single end balcony, fully rebuilt 1988.
Van 7	1898	FR Boston Lodge Works	Single compartment brake 3rd.	6 (3rd)		Built as a replica of the No. 1 brake van converted from third type quarrymen's coach (same as No. 8) circa 1930, two end balconies.
Van 51 (Previously No. 1 Van)	1964	Ffestiniog Railway Society Midland Area Group	Single compartment brake without balconies	8 (3rd)		Built to replace the original No. 1 van (No. 7 above), this important vehicle is understood to be the first vehicle ever constructed "entirely by volunteers" for service on any 'preserved' railway. Like the 'original' it uses parts including wheels and bearings recycled from a third type quarrymen's coach. This vehicle was refurbished in 1987 and allocated to the FR Civil Engineering Department.
Van 59	1923	GWR Swindon Works	Covered Van	-		Built Swindon (Lot No. 914) and entered service as GWR No. 38089 on the Vale of Rheidol Railway as a steel underframed, metal strapped wooden bodied cattle wagon. Converted 1937 to 2 ft 6 in (0.76 m) gauge for service on the Welshpool and Llanfair Light Railway rebuilt and returned to the original gauge (but a lower loading gauge) in 1968 by the Ffestiniog Railway Society East Anglian Group for FR service as a covered van. Modified doors fitted 1983. Sold to Vale of Rheidol in 2014.
n/a	2005	Boston Lodge Works	Spooner's Boat			A replica of one of the more unusual passenger vehicles to travel on the Ffestiniog Railway. The boat is a four-person, sail-powered vehicle which was built before 1864 as an inspection vehicle for the Spooner family. It travelled downhill by gravity and could be sailed across the Cob. The original was wrecked in 1886 when it crashed into a train. The modern replica is used on special occasions only.

=== Bogie passenger coaches and vans ===
The principal source of information for this table is the: "Rheilffordd Ffestiniog Railway Traveller's Guide" by the FR Company circa 2002, supplemented by later information as it becomes available. Updated with information from the General Appendix to the 2006 Rule Book.

Present Number	Date built	Builder	Compartments (from Blaenau end)	number of seats	Image	Notes
Van 1	2004	FR Boston Lodge Works	Guard/Luggage/Dog	0		A replica of an 1873 Brown Marshall & Co. bogie van, familiarly known as the curly roofed van. The original van 1 was scrapped in 1921.
Van 2	1873	FR Boston Lodge Works	3/3/G (guard)	12		Built as No. 2 brake/luggage van, rebuilt between 1920 and 1921, fully restored to 1920/21 condition in 1991. Renumbered from Carriage 10 in 2005.
Van 3	1873	FR Boston Lodge Works	Guard/Luggage/Dog	0		Survived until the beginning of post-restoration in 1955, now scrapped. The 2004 replica of Van 1 was based on this vehicle.
Van 4	1880	Gloucester Railway Carriage and Wagon Company	G/1/1 observation	15		Built as No. 4 luggage van, rebuilt between 1928 and 1929 as a passenger/brakevan, rebuilt between 1957 and 1958 as observation car, given a steel underframe 1962. Renumbered from Carriage 11 in 2005.
Van 5	1880	Gloucester Railway Carriage and Wagon Company	3/saloon/guard	25		Built as No. 5 luggage van, rebuilt between 1929 and 1930 as passenger/brakevan. It was restored in 1955, had a buffet counter and side corridor added in 1957, had its buffet car and saloon reordered in 1960, was lengthened with steel underframe in 1963, and had major repairs and new seat layout without buffet counter in 1982. Renumbered from Carriage 12 in 2005.
14	1896	Bristol Wagon & Carriage Works, Bristol	3 saloon/buffet	26		Built for the Lynton and Barnstaple Railway Co. as Brake 3rd No. 15 and restored in 1963 and 1998.
15	1872	Brown Marshalls & Co. Birmingham	3/3/3/1/3/3/3	48+6		Designed by George Percival Spooner and entered service January 1873, with No. 16 as the first bogie coaches of any gauge to operate in Britain. Built with iron underframes and iron framing for the coachwork. Restored in 1960 and rebuilt in 2001 with Heritage Lottery Fund backing.
16	1872	Brown Marshalls & Co. Birmingham	3/3/3/1/1c/3/3	40+9		Same design as No. 15, being the first bogie coaches to operate in Britain. Restored (with a 1st coupe in place of the second class compartment) in 1969 largely by Mr R.G. Jarvis, rebuilt in 2001 with Heritage Lottery Fund backing.
17	1876	Brown Marshalls & Co. Birmingham	3/3/1/3/3/3	40+6		Designed by George Percival Spooner. Constructed with iron frames but had a conventional coach-built bodywork with bowed sides. Restored in 1956 and 1990. Numbers 17 to 20 commonly known as 'bowsiders'.
18	1876	Brown Marshalls & Co. Birmingham	3/3/1/3/3/3	40+6		Built as No. 17 and restored in 1957 and 2003.
19	1879	Gloucester Railway Carriage and Wagon Company	3/3/1/1/3/3	32+12		Designed by George Percival Spooner. Constructed with wrought-iron underframes but had a conventional coach-built bodywork with bowed sides. Originally 1st, 2nd, and 3rd class. Restored in 1963, 1982 and 2008.
20	1879	Gloucester Railway Carriage and Wagon Company	3/3/1/1/3/3	32+12		Built as No. 19 and restored in 1957 and 1987.
22	1896	Ashbury Carriage and Wagon Co Manchester	3/3/3/3/3/3/3	56		A low-cost vehicle built for tourist traffic. Fitted with wooden underframe. Restored in 1958 and fitted with steel underframe 1967. Rebuilt with new body in 1984. Bears very little resemblance to its original form.
23	1894	Ashbury Carriage and Wagon Co Manchester	3/3/3/3/3/3/3	56		Built for the North Wales Narrow Gauge Railways, became Welsh Highland Railway stock in 1923 and Ffestiniog Railway stock (in exchange for three bogie wagons) in 1936. Returned to service in 1955 and had full doors fitted in 1966. Currently running on the Welsh Highland Railway.
24	2002	Boston Lodge Works		42		A replica of carriage No. 23 in its original 1894 North Wales Narrow Gauge Railways form.
26	1894	Ashbury Carriage and Wagon Co Manchester	3/3/3/3/3/3/3	56		Built for the North Wales Narrow Gauge Railways, became Welsh Highland Railway stock in 1923 and sold to a farmer for use as a hen-house. Body bought in 1959. Restored to service in 1959 and had full doors fitted in 1965. Rebuilt with a new body in 1986. Bears very little resemblance to its original form.
37	1971	FR Boston Lodge Works	3/3/3/3	32		Semi-open tourist coach (with half-doors originally used on coaches 23 and 26), it was built on a Hudson bogie wagon underframe.
38	1971	FR Boston Lodge Works	3/3/3/3	32		Semi-open tourist coach (with half-doors originally used on coaches 23 and 26), it was built on a Hudson bogie wagon underframe, which had seen similar use in the 1920s.
39	1992	Winson Engineering	3/3/3/3	24		Replica of one of a batch of six semi-open 'toastrack' tourist coaches (without doors) that were built by the Hudson Wagon Co. in the 1920s for the Festiniog Railway and Welsh Highland Railway. This replica was built on a Hudson bogie wagon underframe.
100	2007	FR Boston Lodge Works	1 saloon/1 observation	20		The new "100" which replaced the 1964 'Centenary Stock' vehicle of this number in 2007. First Class Observation Car similar to the design of 102, without a guard's compartment. Fitted with moveable seats and tables in the observation end which can be removed to allow wheelchairs to be accommodated. Paired with Service Carriage 124.
102	2005	FR Boston Lodge Works	G/1 saloon/1 observation	16		First Class Observation Car similar to the original 'Centenary Stock' 100 and 101. Brought into service in August 2005 for the 50th anniversary of the start of restoration of passenger trains. Fitted with moveable seats and tables in the observation end which can be removed to allow wheelchairs to be accommodated. Provided with heating for out of season services.
103	2010	FR Boston Lodge Works	3rd saloon	35		First 'Super Saloon', luxury Third Saloon with recessed vestibules and fold away seat for wheelchair accommodation. Replaced centenary stock buffet car which carried the same number.
104	1964	FR Boston Lodge Works	3 saloon/1/3 saloon	32 + 4		Prototype for the 'Centenary Stock'. Body rebuilt in 1985 with side corridor compartment.
105	1966	FR Boston Lodge Works	3 saloon/1/3 saloon/Toilet	22 + 4		'Centenary Stock'. Toilet fitted at the bottom end of carriage.
105	Minor rebuild in 1998	FR Boston Lodge Works	3 saloon/1/3 saloon	32 + 4		'Centenary Stock'. Toilet at the bottom end of carriage removed in 1988.
105	Major rebuild in 2005	FR Boston Lodge Works	3 saloon/Toilet/3 saloon	32		'Centenary Stock'. Rebuilt with a toilet replacing the first class compartment and wheelchair space with tip-up seats.
106	1968	FR Boston Lodge Works	3 saloon/1/3 saloon	32 + 4		Rebodied 2002 - 'Centenary Stock'.
107	2004	FR Boston Lodge Works	3 saloon/1/3 saloon	32 + 4		New build to the 'Centenary Stock' design.
110	1975	FR Boston Lodge Works	3 saloon	42		Given the number 30 when new and fitted with auto control (now removed) and driving compartment first used on the Dduallt-Gelliwiog shuttle service on 26 May 1975. This is the first all-steel coach to be built at Boston Lodge, with a semi-stressed skin and centre spine underframe. Provided with diesel heating for out of season service. Nominated as historic carriage to be retained in original form representing steel bodied stock from the 1970s and 1980s.
111	1990	FR Boston Lodge Works	G/lavatory/1 saloon/driving compartment	11		Driving trailer for diesel push/pull off peak service. Steel body mounted on ex-Isle of Man Railway underframe R5 and pattern 88 bogies. Provided with diesel-fired heating for out of season services. Transferred to departmental service on 1 January, 2016
112	1991	Carnforth Railway restoration and FR Boston Lodge	3 saloon/1/1	17 + 8		Diesel-fired heating for out of season service. Aluminium body mounted on steel underframe and pattern 88 bogies.
113	1991	Carnforth Railway restoration and FR Boston Lodge	3 saloon/1/1	17 + 8		Aluminium body mounted on steel underframe and pattern 88 bogies. Transferred to Welsh Highland Railway from 2003 to 2009. Diesel-fired heating for out of season service.
114	1991	Carnforth Railway restoration and FR Boston Lodge	3 saloon/Buffet	19		Diesel-fired heating for out of season service. Aluminium body mounted on steel underframe and pattern 88 bogies.
116	1972	Edmund Crow and FR Boston Lodge	'Enhanced' 3 saloon	36		Prototype aluminium body mounted on running gear at Boston Lodge. Rebuilt in 1982 and again in 2008 when the first class compartment was removed and the carriage was fitted with diesel-fired heating. Window spacing was changed at this time to permit improved seat spacing.
117	1977	FR Boston Lodge Works	3 saloon	32		Diesel-fired heating for out of season service. Steel body mounted on ex-Isle of Man Railway underframe R8 and pattern 88 bogies. Vehicle reframed and rebodied to Super Saloon standards in the spring of 2016. Old body and frame sold to Apedale.
118	1977	FR Boston Lodge Works	3 saloon	39		Steel body mounted on ex-Isle of Man Railway underframe R6 and pattern 88 bogies. Vehicle reframed and rebodied to Super Saloon standards in the spring of 2017. Old body and frame sold to Golden Valley Railway Butterley.
119	1980	FR Boston Lodge Works	3 saloon/lavatory	32		Steel body mounted on ex-Isle of Man Railway underframe R10 and pattern 88 bogies. Reframed and rebodied to Super Saloon standards between 2014 and 2015. Old body sold to Golden Valley Railway Butterley.
120	1980	FR Boston Lodge Works	3 saloon	36		Steel body mounted on ex-Isle of Man Railway underframe R11 and pattern 88 bogies. Scheduled for reframing and rebodying to Super Saloon standards.
121	2012	FR Boston Lodge Works	3 saloon	35		Second wooden-bodied 'Super Saloon' carriage with diesel heating and collapsible seat for wheelchair use. Replaced the steel-bodied carriage of the same number whose underframe was used for 124.
122	2002	FR Boston Lodge Works	3 saloon	36		A prototype design using monocoque construction which remained a 'one off'. Diesel-fueled heating for out of season service.
123	1970	FR Boston Lodge Works	3 saloon	30		Built as the railway's second Observation Car, 101 saw service on the Festiniog Railway until 2006 when it was transferred to the Welsh Highland Railway. Downgraded to 3rd Class in 2008, 101 became surplus to requirements in 2009; in 2011, this carriage was transferred back to the FR, extensively rebuilt, renumbered, and reentered service as Carriage 123, leaving the number 101 available for a new-build carriage. This carriage is a 'wrong way round' observation 3rd Saloon, with the former Guard's compartment doors providing a perfect boarding point for wheelchairs.
124	2007	FR Boston Lodge Works	Service Vehicle (Guard/Toilet/Buffet)	0		Isle of Man underframe R7 from carriage 121 reused, with a 'Barn' style wooden body. The first of the new service vehicles, it was provided with a generator for on-board catering equipment and heating.
125	2016	FR Boston Lodge Works	Service Vehicle (Guard/Toilet/Buffet)	0		High-spec service vehicle specifically designed to run paired with Observation Car No. 150 as part of 'New Train' launched in spring of 2016. Full Saloon Body size, fitted with high capacity generator.
150	2015	FR Boston Lodge Works	Luxury Art Deco inspired Observation Car.	24		New generation Pullman Observation carriage for the 'New Train', designed to complement the Super Saloons. Art Deco inspired hand crafted hardwood interior featuring Birds Eye Maple roof panels. Paired with Service Car No. 125. Diesel-fueled heating for out of season service. Named "Gwynedd" in April 2019.
152	2018	FR Boston Lodge Works	Luxury Art Deco inspired Observation Car.	22		New generation Pullman Observation carriage, designed to complement the Super Saloons. Art Deco inspired hand crafted hardwood interior featuring Birds Eye Maple roof panels. Diesel-fueled heating for out of season service. Very similar to 150, but with a few minor differences.
1111	1997	Bloomfield Steel Construction Co, Tipton and FR Boston Lodge Works	Saloon/kitchen/lavatory	-		Body shell fitted out at Boston Lodge as a service and mess car for the Permanent Way department staff and volunteers. The vehicle is 40 ft (12 m) long and the Ffestiniog Railway's longest, but quite narrow to enable staff to walk alongside on embankments and elsewhere within the confines of the FR's very limited clearances. Not fitted with Norwegian "Chopper" couplings. Although it is fitted with vacuum brakes, they are not used as FR works trains do not use continuous brakes and 1111 often functions as a brakevan.

== See also ==
- British narrow-gauge railways
