= Victorian Railways L class (1859) =

Class of Australian 2-4-0ST steam locomotives

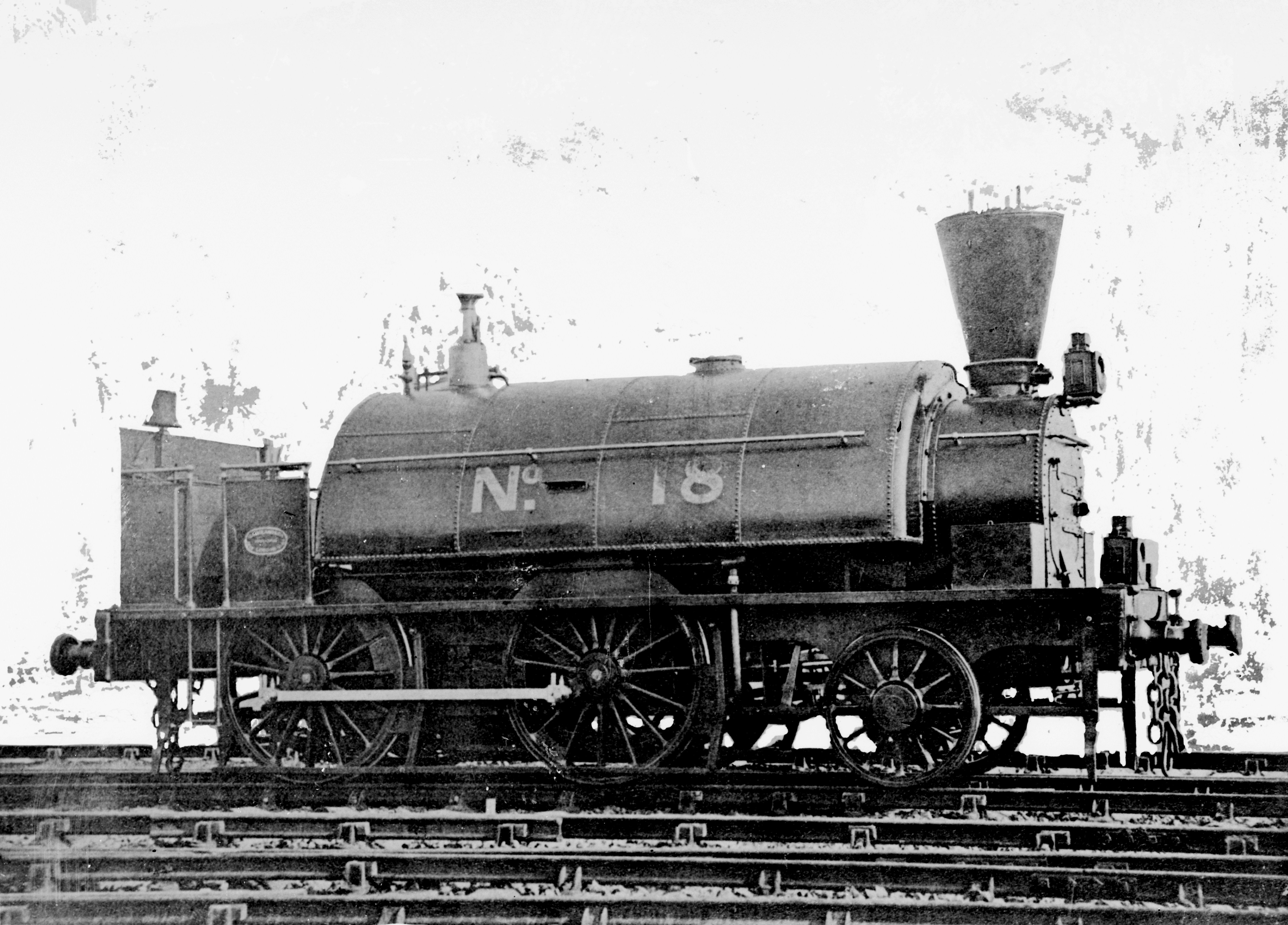
Type and origin
- Power type: Steam
- Builder: George England and Co., Newcastle upon Tyne, UK (7); Slaughter, Gruning & Co., Bristol, UK (3)
- Serial number: George England: 156 - 159, 164 - 166; Slaughter & Grüning: 408 - 410
- Build date: 1859 - 1860
- Total produced: 10
Specifications
- Configuration
  - Whyte: 2-4-0ST
- Gauge: 5 ft 3 in (1,600 mm) Victorian broad gauge
- Leading dia.: 3 ft 6 in (1,070 mm)
- Driver dia.: 5 ft 0 in (1,520 mm)
- Wheelbase: 14 ft 6 in (4.42 m)
  - Coupled: 7 ft 6 in (2,290 mm)
- Length
  - Over couplers: 28 ft 6 in (8.69 m)
- Height: 13 ft 4 in (4.06 m)
- Axle load: 13 long tons 11 cwt (30,400 lb or 13.8 t); 1904 diagram: 12 long tons 18 cwt (28,900 lb or 13.1 t)
- Loco weight: 37 long tons 7 cwt (83,700 lb or 37.9 t); 1904 diagram: 35 long tons 14 cwt (80,000 lb or 36.3 t)
- Fuel capacity: 20 long cwt (2,200 lb or 1,000 kg)
- Water cap.: 1,195 imp gal (5,430 L; 1,435 US gal)
- Firebox
  - Grate area: 14.00 sq ft (1.301 m^{2})
- Boiler pressure: 130 psi (896 kPa); 1904 diagram: 14, 18, 22 - 32: 130 psi (896 kPa); 16: 100 psi (689 kPa); 20: 110 psi (758 kPa)
- Heating surface
  - Firebox: 87.25 sq ft (8.106 m^{2})
  - Tubes: 1,086.63 sq ft (100.951 m^{2})
  - Total surface: 1,173.88 sq ft (109 m^{2})
- Cylinders: 2, inside
- Cylinder size: 16 in × 22 in (406 mm × 559 mm); 1904 diagram: 15 in × 22 in (381 mm × 559 mm)
Performance figures
- Tractive effort: 9,386 lbf (41.75 kN) at 100 psi 1904 diagram - 130psi: 8,580 lbf (38.2 kN)
Career
- Operators: Victorian Railways
- Number in class: 10
- Numbers: Numbers at delivery: 16-25 (never ran with these), Numbers in service: 14-32 (even only)
- Delivered: 1860
- First run: January 1861
- Last run: 20 January 1906 (45 years)
- Withdrawn: 1900 - 1906
- Disposition: All scrapped

The Victorian Railways L class was a class of 2-4-0ST passenger locomotives operated by the Victorian Railways between 1861 and 1906, built by both George England and Co., Newcastle upon Tyne, England and Slaughter, Gruning & Co., Bristol, England.

== History ==
Victorian Railways initially numbered passenger and goods locomotives separately, the engines were delivered with numbers 16–25. This system was changed before these locos entered service to odd numbers for goods locomotives and even numbers for passenger locos with these locomotives taking the even numbers 14–32. This odd and even system remained in use until 1912. In 1886, they were allocated to Class L.

=== Production ===
Seven locomotives were built by George England and Co. in 1859 with builder's numbers 156–166, and a further three were built by Slaughter, Grüning & Co. in 1860 with builder's numbers 408–410 at an average cost of £3305-18-8 for each loco.

=== Regular service ===
Upon introduction they were used on the Williamstown and Geelong lines, and hauled the first train on the Geelong–Ballarat line in 1862. In 1893, seven were allocated to Melbourne and three were stored.
They finished their days on suburban lines such as the Fairfield to Riversdale section of the Outer Circle line and the Burnley to Darling line.

=== Design improvements ===
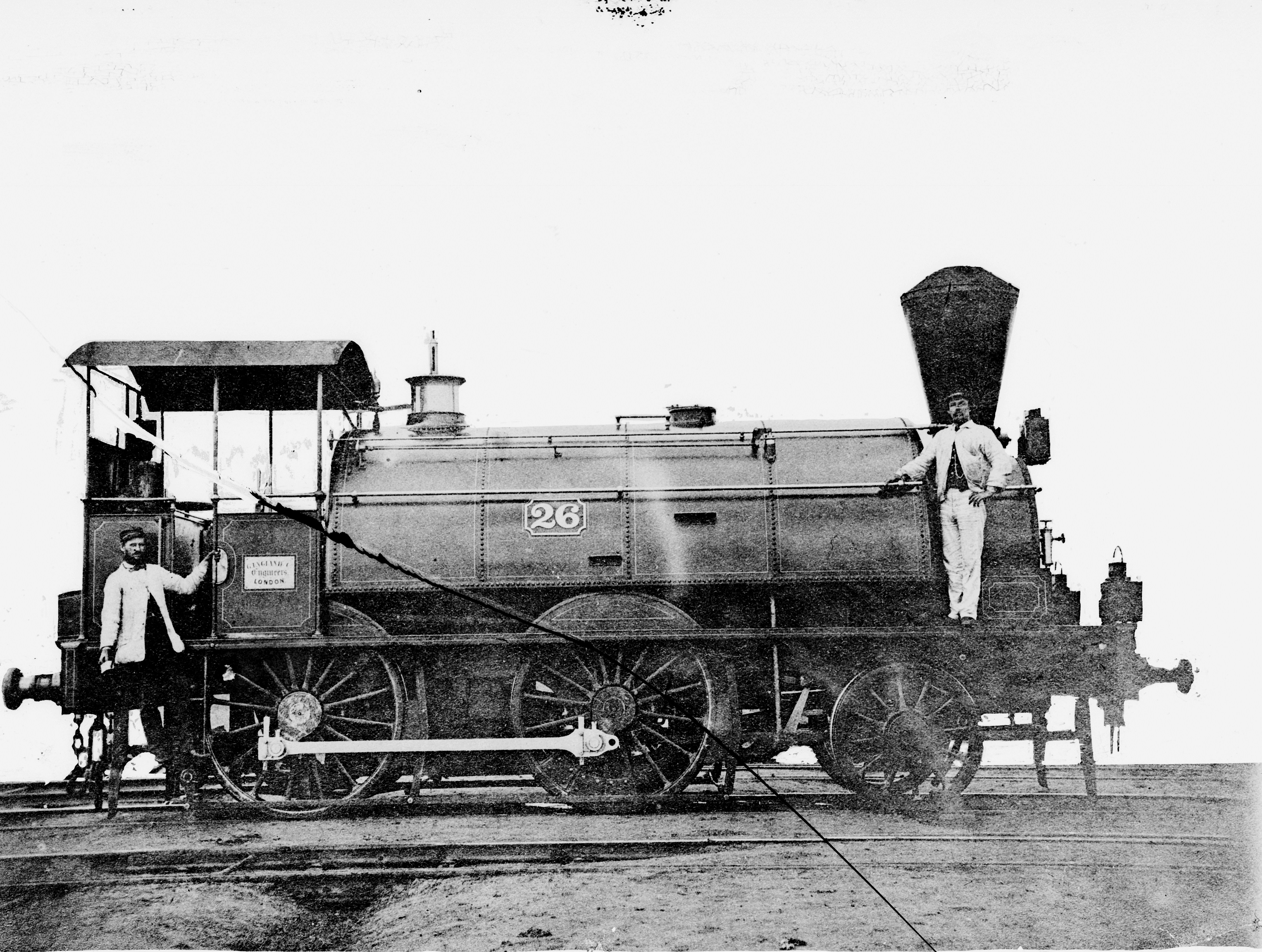
L 26 with later modifications including cab roof.

Over the years they were fitted with various alterations to the cabs. There were also various upgrades over the years; with constant improvements to safety — these including things like updates to safety valves (and domes), smokeboxs and chimneys (with spark arrestors), and brakes.
L14 received a new boiler in 1875, L26 in 1884, L16 & L18 in 1885, and L24 in 1886.

=== Accidents ===
- 24 December 1878 - L14 collided with V13 in the Melbourne Yard
- 19 February 1879 - L14 collided with Q95 at Essendon
- 28 August 1883 - L20 collided with O79 at Newmarket
- 13 May 1888 - L28 ran through crossing gates at Clifton Hill
- May 1891 - L32 ran through crossing gates at Deepdene

=== Demise ===
L28 was used as a stationary engine at Newport Workshops to drive forging machines between 1900 and c. 1908. L16 was used as a stationary engine at Mathieson's siding, Wandong from 1902. In September 1904, L32 had its tank, wheels, axles, and brakes removed and was sold to Sanderson's saw mill, Otway Ranges for £250 where it apparently survived until finally being scrapped c. 1941.
The remainder were withdrawn between 1904 and 1906.

== Fleet summary ==
Key:	In service	Preserved	Stored or withdrawn	Scrapped

Locomotive	Previous numbers	Builder no.	Entered service	Withdrawn	Scrapped	Status	Notes
L14	16	156	January 1861	11 June 1904		Scrapped	Reboilered - 5 August 1875
L16	17	157	January 1861	1902		Scrapped	Reboilered - 17 December 1885. Stationary boiler at Mathieson's siding - 1902
L18	18	158	July 1861	25 November 1905		Scrapped	Reboilered - 26 October 1885
L20	19	159	January 1861	20 January 1906		Scrapped	
L22	20	164	December 1861	18 November 1905		Scrapped	
L24	21	165	December 1861	22 October 1904		Scrapped	Reboilered - 28 April 1886
L26	22	166	September 1861	17 September 1904		Scrapped	Reboilered - 13 June 1884
L28	23	408	June 1861	1900	c. 1908	Scrapped	Stationary engine at Newport - 1900
L30	24	409	May 1861	23 July 1904		Scrapped	
L32	25	410	June 1861	October 1904	c. 1941	Scrapped	Sold to Sanderson's saw mill (£250) - September 1904
