= Festiniog Railway Princess =

Princess
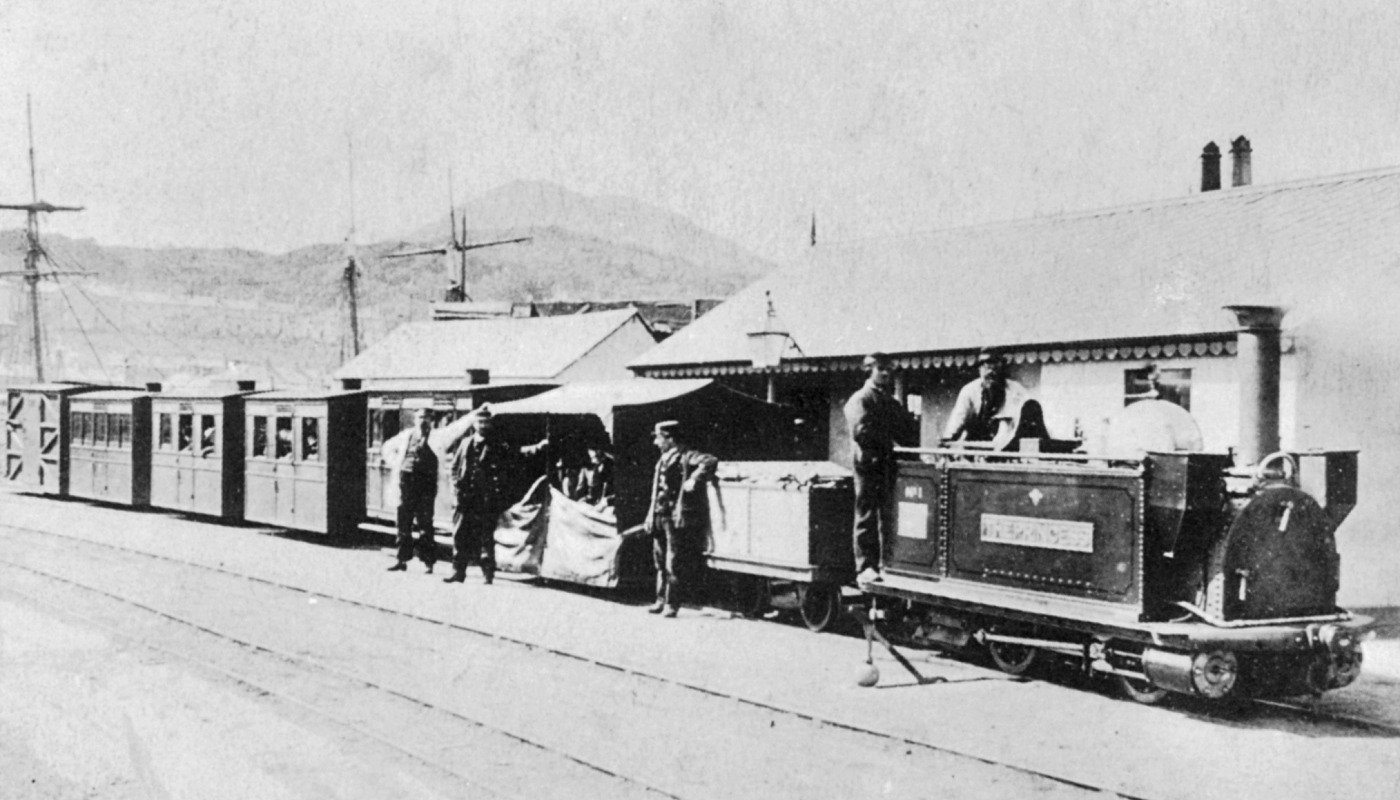
- Princess at Porthmadog Harbour Station around 1870
Type and origin
- Power type: Steam
- Builder: George England
- Build date: 1863
Specifications
- Configuration
  - Whyte: 0-4-0TT
- Gauge: 1 ft 11 1/2 in (597 mm)
- Driver dia.: 2 ft (0.61 m)
- Loco weight: 11 long tons (11 t)
- Water cap.: 380 imperial gallons (1,700 L; 460 US gal)
- Boiler pressure: 160 psi (1,100 kPa) †
- Cylinders: Two, outside
- Cylinder size: 8.25 in × 12 in (210 mm × 305 mm)
- Valve gear: Allan straight link valve gear
Career
- Operators: Ffestiniog Railway
- Class: 'Small England' class
- Numbers: FfR 1
- Official name: The Princess; Princess
- Last run: 1 August 1946
- Withdrawn: 1 August 1946

Princess is an 0-4-0ST+T steam locomotive built by George England for the Ffestiniog Railway in 1863. It is one of the earliest narrow gauge steam locomotives and is one of the three oldest surviving narrow gauge locomotives still on its original railway.

== History ==
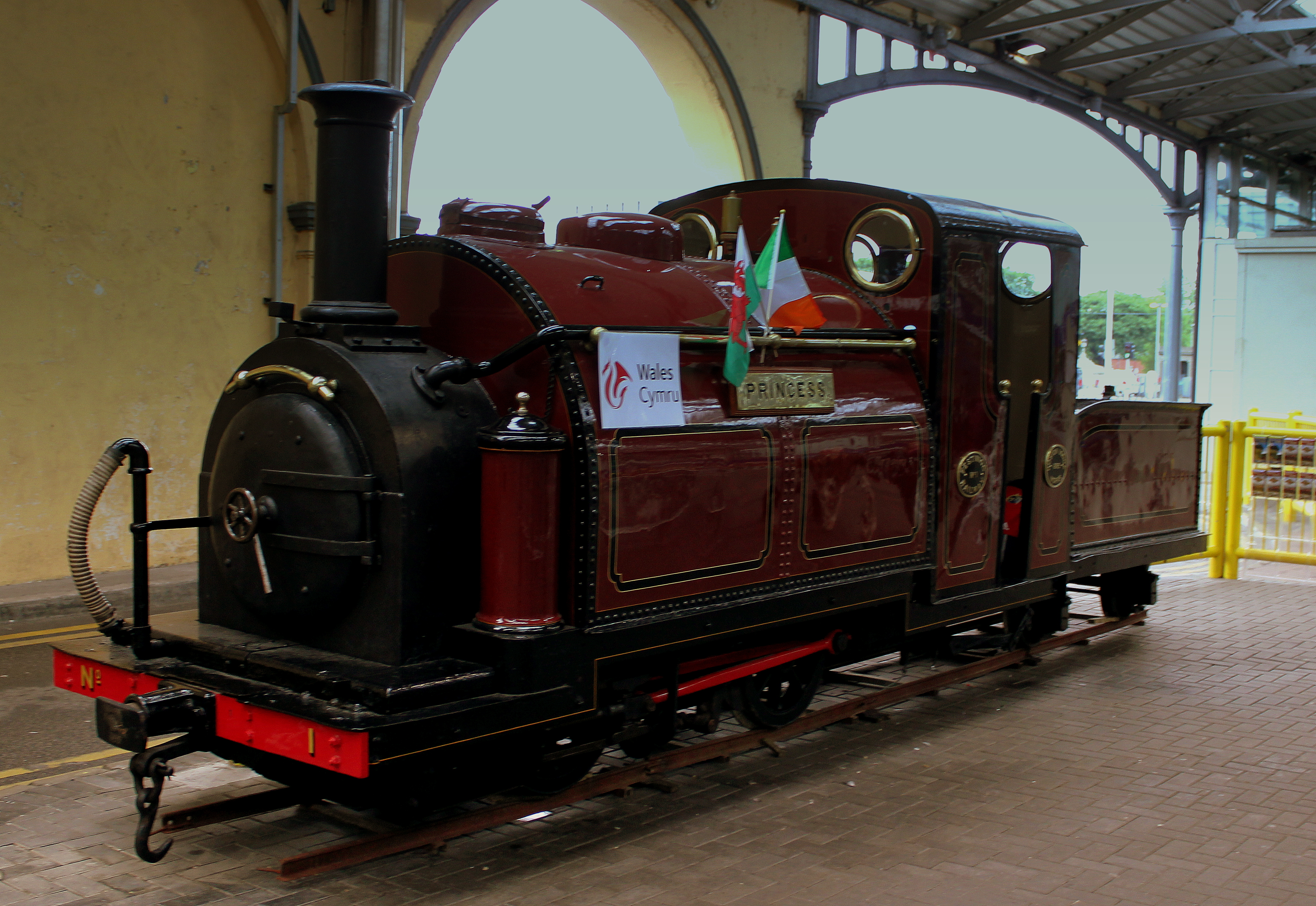
Princess on display at Dublin's Heuston station as part of the celebration of its 150th. anniversary.

Princess was the first steam locomotive delivered to the Ffestiniog Railway. It was originally named The Princess - after Princess Alexandra of Denmark - and carried the number 1. As delivered it was an 0-4-0 side tank without a cab. It began hauling public trains in September 1863.

From 1868, The Princess began hauling trains on the Festiniog and Blaenau Railway as well as the Ffestiniog Railway.

In December 1882, The Princess underwent a substantial overhaul and a large cast iron weight was placed over the side tanks and boiler, giving the locomotive extra adhesive weight and the appearance of a saddle tank. It ran a significant mileage in the 1880s and early 1890s. In 1893 it underwent another major overhaul, receiving a full cab and a true saddle tank; at the same time its name was shortened to Princess. After returning from overhaul in 1923, Princess also worked trains on the Welsh Highland Railway which by then was being operated by the Ffestiniog Railway. It worked until the closure of the Ffestiniog Railway on 1 August 1946, hauling the last train.

After the railway was preserved, Princess remained in the same condition it was withdrawn in. In 1969 it was put on public display at Blaenau Ffestiniog. In 1981, after being repainted in a red livery, it was placed in Spooner's Bar at Harbour Station.

In 2012, Princess was moved out of Spooner's, and in 2013 it was displayed at Paddington Station to commemorate the 150th anniversary of its construction.

== See also ==
- List of Ffestiniog Railway rolling stock
