= Victorian Railways V class (1857) =

Class of Australian 0-6-0 steam locomotives

Type and origin
- Power type: Steam
- Builder: George England and Co., Newcastle upon Tyne, UK
- Serial number: 142 - 145
- Build date: 1857
- Total produced: 4
Specifications
- Configuration
  - Whyte: 0-6-0
- Gauge: 5 ft 3 in (1,600 mm) Victorian broad gauge
- Driver dia.: 5 ft 0 in (1,520 mm)
- Tender wheels: 3 ft 6 in (1.07 m)
- Wheelbase: 31 ft 11 1/2 in (9.741 m)
  - Coupled: 15 ft 0 in (4.57 m)
  - Tender: 10 ft 2 in (3.10 m)
- Length
  - Over couplers: 42 ft 8 1/2 in (13.018 m)
- Height: 13 ft 3 in (4.04 m)
- Axle load: 10 long tons 12 cwt (23,700 lb or 10.8 t); Reboilered 1880s: 12 long tons 8 cwt (27,800 lb or 12.6 t)
- Loco weight: 30 long tons 6 cwt (67,900 lb or 30.8 t); Reboilered 1880s: 30 long tons 8 cwt 2 qr (68,150 lb or 30.91 t)
- Tender weight: 18 long tons 16 cwt (42,100 lb or 19.1 t); Reboilered 1880s: 19 long tons 2 cwt (42,800 lb or 19.4 t)
- Total weight: 49 long tons 2 cwt (110,000 lb or 49.9 t); Reboilered 1880s: 49 long tons 10 cwt 2 qr (110,940 lb or 50.32 t)
- Fuel capacity: 60 long cwt (6,700 lb or 3,000 kg)
- Water cap.: 1,646 imp gal (7,480 L; 1,977 US gal)
- Firebox
  - Grate area: 14.81 sq ft (1.376 m^{2})
- Boiler pressure: Reboilered 1880s: 130 psi (896 kPa)
- Heating surface
  - Firebox: 90.89 sq ft (8.444 m^{2})
  - Tubes: 1,287.77 sq ft (119.638 m^{2})
  - Total surface: 1,378.66 sq ft (128 m^{2})
- Cylinders: 2, inside
- Cylinder size: 16 in × 22 in (406 mm × 559 mm)
Performance figures
- Tractive effort: Reboilered 1880s: 9,386 lbf (41.75 kN) at 100 psi
Career
- Operators: Victorian Railways
- Number in class: 4
- Numbers: 1-4, Later 2-5, 1860: 11-17 (odd only), 1895: 497
- Delivered: 1858
- First run: 16 September 1858
- Last run: 13 September 1904 (45.7 years)
- Withdrawn: 1891 - 1904
- Disposition: All scrapped

The Victorian Railways V class of 1857 was a class of 0-6-0 goods locomotives operated by the Victorian Railways between 1858 and 1904, built by George England and Co., Newcastle upon Tyne, England.

== History ==
Victorian Railways initially numbered passenger and goods locomotives separately. The goods engines were numbered 1–4 (the first passenger engine was also numbered 1). This was changed to consecutive numbering between June 1859 and March 1860 with the goods locos being numbers 2–5. With the introduction of the J class in 1860, to avoid confusion these were temporarily altered to 2A–5A. The numbering was once again changed in the late 1860s to odd numbers for goods locomotives and even numbers for passenger locos with these locomotives taking the odd numbers 11–17. This odd and even system remained in use until 1912. In 1886, they were allocated to Class V.

=== Production ===
The four locomotives were built in 1857 with builder's numbers 142–145 at a cost of £2300, +£900 freight and insurance, for each loco. The first arrived in Port Phillip on 12 May 1858 along with 2-2-2 passenger locomotive No. 1, the remaining three arrived in Port Phillip on 31 May 1858.

=== Regular service ===
In addition to regular goods service, some were loaned to contractors, like Cornish & Bruce, for line construction and ballasting purposes. In 1894, it was noted that three were allocated one each to Daylesford, Geelong, and Sale.

=== Design improvements ===
Over the years they were fitted with various new cabs. There were also various upgrades over the years; with constant improvements to safety — these including things like updates to safety valves (and domes), brakes, and cowcatchers — and improvements for their usability — handrails and footboards. The original brakes provided was a hand brake on the tender with wood blocks on all six wheels. This was upgraded to steam brakes on the engines in 1884–1886, and at least two (V15 and V17) were later fitted with Westinghouse air brakes.
New boilers with a working pressure of 130psi were fitted, starting with V11 in 1880, and the remaining 3 locomotives in 1884–1885.

=== Accidents ===
- December 1878 - V13 collided with L14 in the Melbourne Yard
- August 1879 - V17 collided with O65 in Melbourne Yard
- January 1883 - V13 ran off-road on Dock Pier
- September 1890 - No 497 in shops after accident
- 29 November 1894 - V17 broke leading axle near Bairnsdale

=== Demise ===
All the locomotives were removed from the Victorian Railways register between 1891 and 1904. V13 was sold to an unknown buyer in 1893, then bought back and renumbered 497 (unclassed). V11 was sold in May 1891 to contractor Andrew O'Keefe for £1900($2700). The remaining locomotives were withdrawn in 1904, with the last V15 being withdrawn on 13 September.

== Fleet summary ==
Key:	In Service	Preserved	Stored or withdrawn	Scrapped

Locomotive	Previous numbers	Builder No.	Entered service	Withdrawn	Scrapped	Status	Notes
V11	1, 2, 2A	142	January 1859	May 1891		Scrapped	New cab - 1880. Sold to O'Keefe (£1900) - May 1891
V13	2, 3, 3A	143	January 1859	1893		-	Sold - 1893
V15	3, 4, 4A	144	January 1859	13 September 1904		Scrapped	New chimney - 23 October 1882. Reboilered - 9 May 1884
V17	4, 5, 5A	145	January 1859	8 August 1904		Scrapped	
497	(ex V13)	144	12 December 1895	7 September 1904		Scrapped	Repurchased by Victorian Railway
