= Festiniog Railway Little Wonder =

Class of 1 British 0-4-4-0T Fairlie locomotives

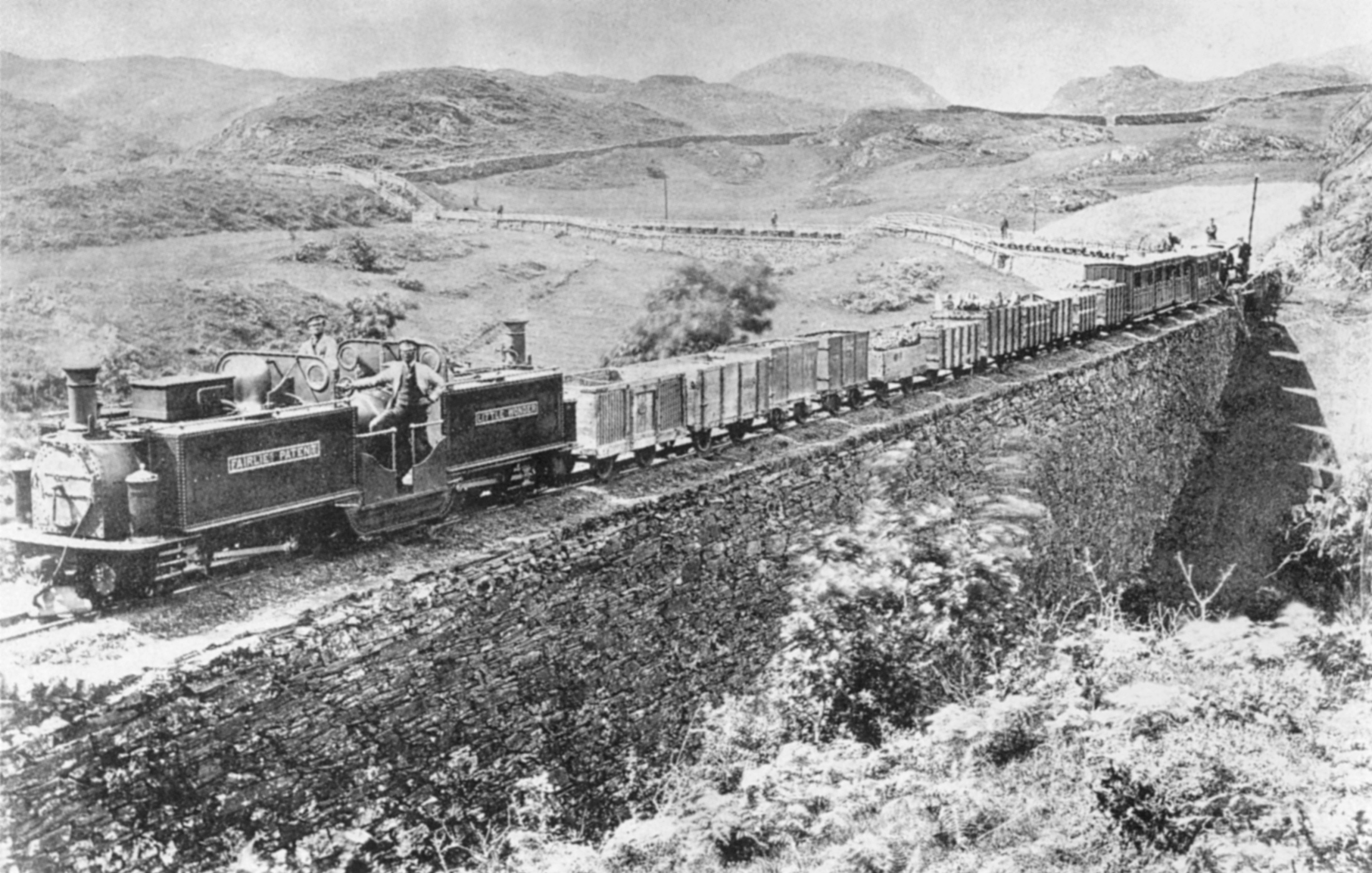
- Little Wonder, photographed c.1871
Type and origin
- Power type: Steam
- Builder: George England
- Build date: 1869
Specifications
- Configuration
  - Whyte: 0-4-4-0T
  - UIC: B′B′ n4t
- Gauge: 1 ft 11 1/2 in (597 mm)
- Driver dia.: 2 ft 4 in (0.71 m)
- Loco weight: 19.5 long tons (19.8 t)
- Water cap.: 720 imp gal (3,300 L; 860 US gal)
- Boiler pressure: 160 psi (1,100 kPa) †
- Cylinders: Four, outside
- Cylinder size: 8.25 in × 13 in (210 mm × 330 mm)
- Valve gear: Gooch valve gear
Performance figures
- Tractive effort: 8,595 lbf (38.23 kN)
Career
- Operators: Ffestiniog Railway
- Numbers: FfR 7
- Official name: Little Wonder
- Withdrawn: 1882
- Disposition: Scrapped in 1882

The Festiniog Railway Little Wonder was a 0-4-4-0T steam locomotive built by George England for the Ffestiniog Railway in 1869.

== Design ==
Little Wonder was a Double Fairlie type articulated locomotive designed by Robert Francis Fairlie. It was the first Double Fairlie locomotive on the Festiniog Railway and the fourth Double Fairlie locomotive to be built. It was delivered to the railway in July 1869. It was an improvement on earlier designs because having two fireboxes instead of one allowed it to steam more freely.

In 1870, Fairlie invited guests to witness Little Wonder in a trial against the Festiniog Railway's existing locomotives Mountaineer and Welsh Pony. Amongst those in attendance were the second Duke of Sutherland, the Imperial Russian Commissioners, the Commissioners of the Indian Government, and Captain Tyler of the Board of Trade. Little Wonder hauled a train of 112 wagons weighing 206 long tons (209 t; 231 short tons) up the line at an average speed of 12 1/2 mph (20.1 km/h). Welsh Pony was only just able to haul a train of 26 wagons weighing 73 long tons (74 t; 82 short tons) at a maximum speed of 5 mph (8.0 km/h).

== Performance ==
Little Wonder was hailed as a great success and attracted attention from around the world. However, various mechanical problems arose and the engine required frequent repairs. It was withdrawn from service in 1882.

== See also ==
- List of Ffestiniog Railway rolling stock
