= 0-4-4-0 =

Locomotive wheel arrangement

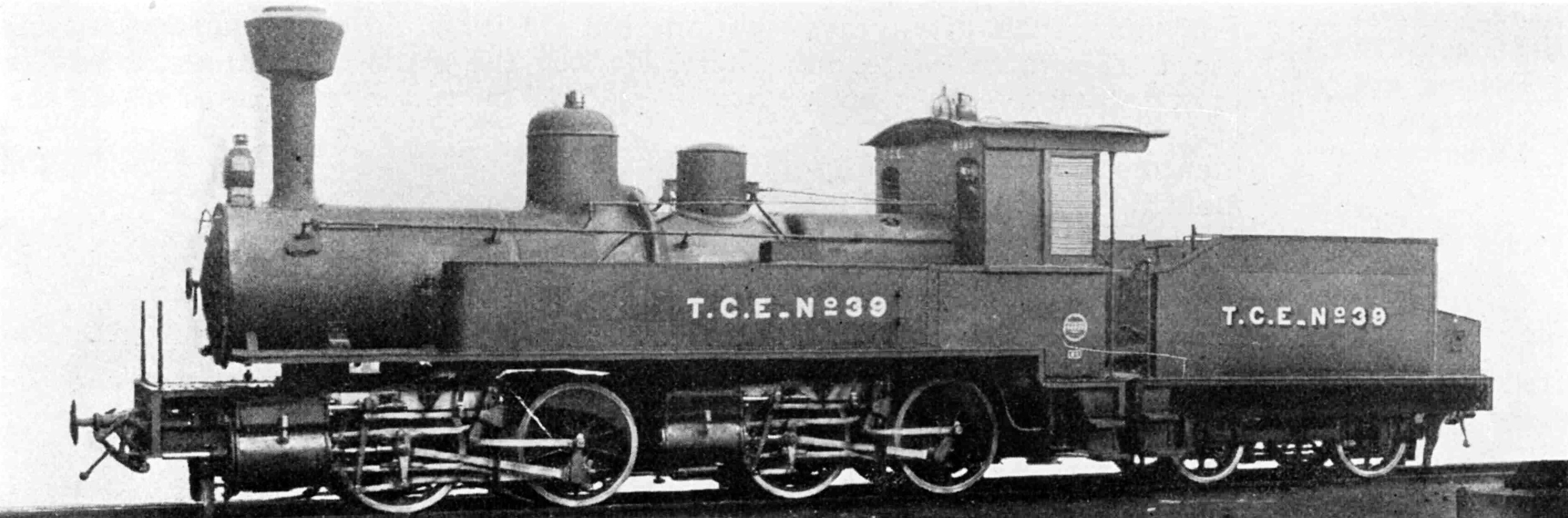
An 0-4-4-0 Mallet of the metre gauge C. de F. de Madagascar. Baldwin Locomotive Works #44609, built 1916.

In the Whyte notation for the classification of steam locomotive wheel arrangement, an 0-4-4-0 is a locomotive with no leading wheels, two sets of four driving wheels, and no trailing wheels. The arrangement is chosen to give the articulation of a locomotive with only the short rigid wheelbase of an 0-4-0, but with its weight spread across eight wheels, and with all the weight carried on the driving wheels; effectively a flexible 0-8-0. Articulated examples were constructed as Mallet, Meyer, BMAG and Double Fairlie locomotives. A similar configuration was used on some Garratt locomotives, but it is referred to as 0-4-0+0-4-0. In the electric and diesel eras, the Bo-Bo is comparable and closest to the Meyer arrangement of two swivelling bogies.

Although rigid duplex locomotives were also constructed with pairs of driving axles and the 0-4-4-0 driven arrangement, these were intended for express passenger service and so were given 4-4-4-4 overall arrangements with leading and trailing bogies for stability.

A few Mallet locomotives were built as 0-4-4-0 tender locomotives, mostly by Baldwin for narrow gauge lines, but all others were 0-4-4-0T tank locomotives. As one of the main goals of this arrangement was to place the most adhesive weight on the drivers, it was sensible to include the weight of coal and water with this.

== Equivalent classifications ==
Other equivalent classifications are:

- UIC classification: (also known as German classification and Italian classification) would be BB for a rigid duplex, but usually B′B for a Mallet locomotive or B′B′ for a Meyer or Fairlie.
- French classification: 020+020
- Turkish classification: 22+22
- Swiss classification: 2×2/2

== Development ==
The first four-wheeled double-bogie locomotives were built by Horatio Allen in 1832. These were four double-boilered locomotives built by the West Point Foundry in New York for the South Carolina Canal and Rail Road Company, the first of these named South Carolina. Although these had many of the features that would later become known as typical for Fairlies, the articulated bogies and the double boiler, the wheels of these bogies were not coupled and so they were instead of a 2-2-0+0-2-2 wheel arrangement. The 'double boiler' in this case also meant two narrow boiler barrels side by side at each end, four in total, not just double-ended.

The first 0-4-4-0 locomotive (Note: Although sometimes described as an 0-4+4-0.) was the Seraing, one of the contestants in the 1851 Semmering Trials. The Semmering railway was the world's first mountain railway and faced unprecedented gradients of 2.5%. This required the development of new techniques in locomotive design for which trials were held and the entrants used various forms of articulation in order to place the most useful power through their driving wheels. Seraing resembled what would become the double Fairlie design, with a double boiler and two articulated powered bogies beneath the frame.

After Semmering, some French engineers also experimented with duplex drive locomotives. Jules Petiet, designed some unsuccessful classes of rigid duplexes with an 0-2-6-2-0 (UIC: A3A) single-boiler but double-ended Crampton in 1862 and a class of twenty 0-6-6-0Ts in 1863. Thouvenot in 1863 produced an 0-6+6-0T design which was closer to the Fairlie type, with a double boiler and swivelling bogies.

=== Meyer locomotives ===
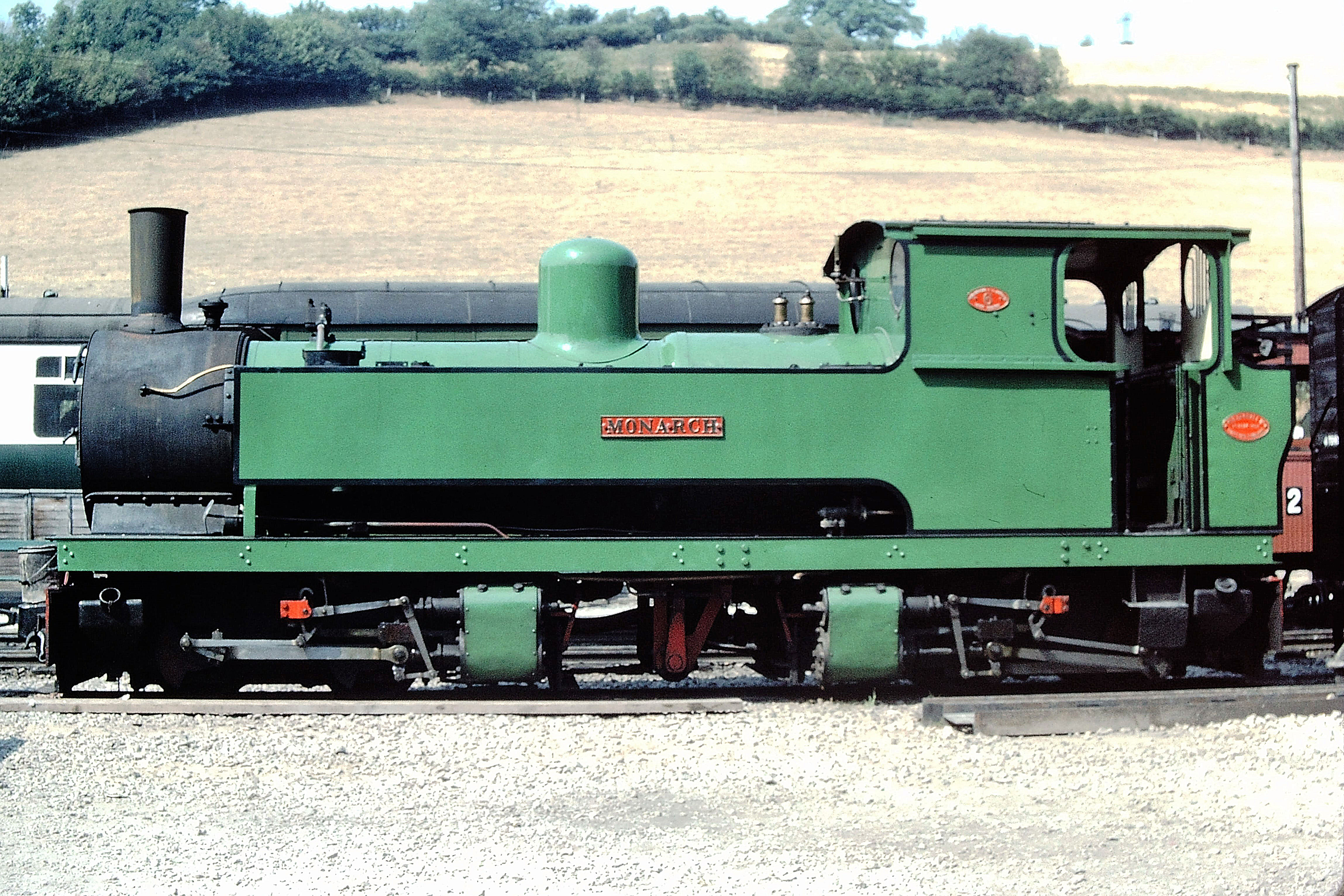
Monarch, a Bagnall-built Meyer of 1953

The first Meyer locomotive, L'Avenir, was built in 1861 and was also derived from a Semmering Trials design, the Neustadt. This had a similar arrangement of two power bogies to Seraing, but a conventional single boiler. Meyer used compounding at first and so the cylinders were placed at the inner ends of the bogies, where the intermediate pressure pipework between them could be kept shorter.

The most numerous Meyer locomotives were a German 750 mm (2 ft 5 1/2 in) narrow gauge class, the DRG Class 99.51–60, of which 96 were built.

The need to place the boiler above the bogies limited the depth of the firebox. W. G. Bagnall worked around this by using their own boiler design with an internal firebox within the circular shell.

=== Fairlie locomotives ===
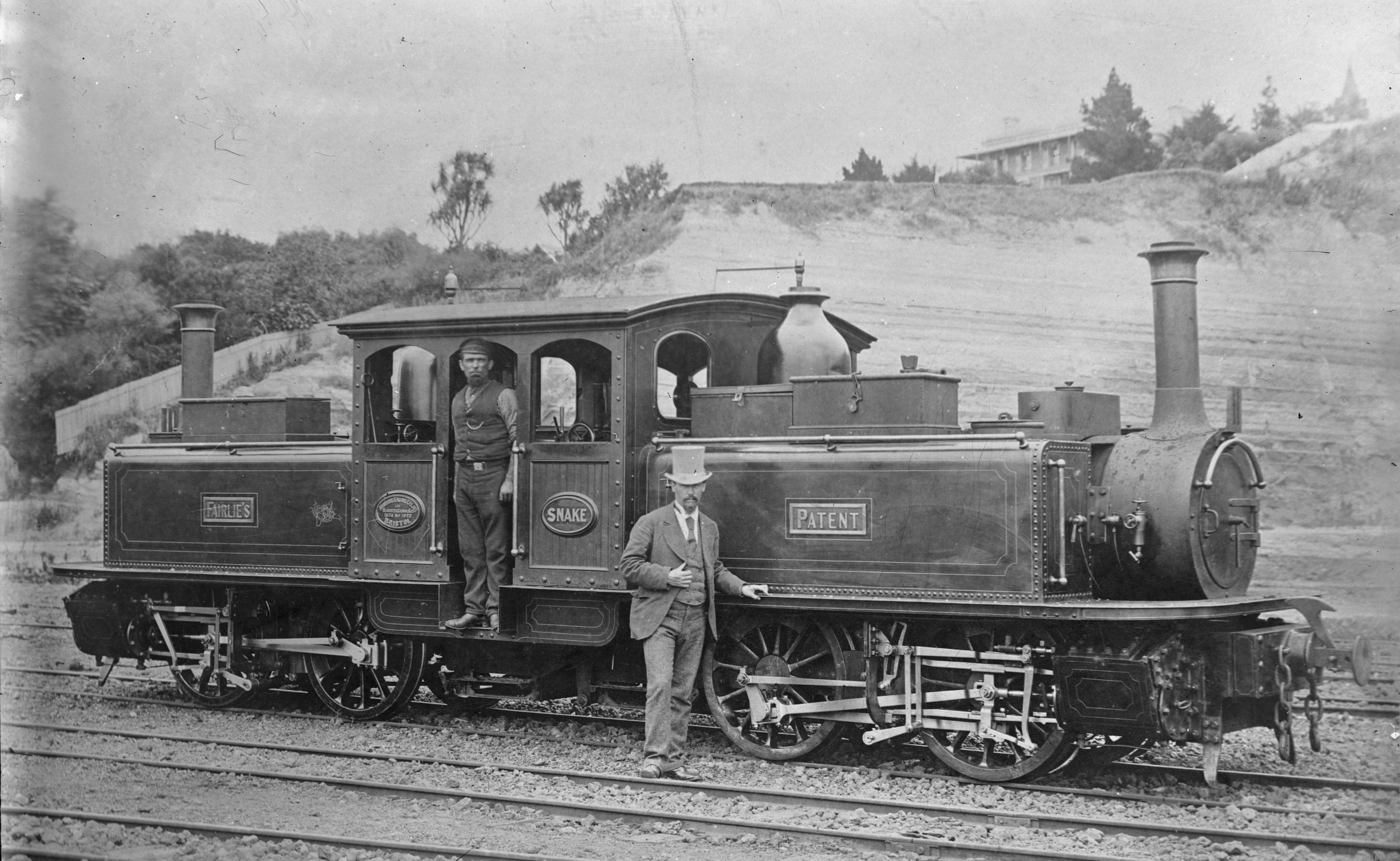
An Avonside-built New Zealand Fairlie of 1874

A decade after Seraing, Robert Fairlie revived the concept and was granted a patent for his design in 1864. It is not known how aware Fairlie was of the other European attempts. Placing the cylinders at the outer ends of the power bogies left a space between them and allowed depth for a conventional firebox, grate and ashpan.

The first Fairlie was an 0-4-4-0T built for the Neath and Brecon Railway in 1866, but the design came to prominence in 1869 with Little Wonder for the Ffestiniog Railway in North Wales followed by five others. One locomotive was supplied to the Denver and Rio Grande Railroad in 1872. The type was also used in Mexico, New Zealand and Russia on Transcaucasian Railway.

==== Survivors ====
There are five examples of surviving Fairlie 0-4-4-0T locomotives on the Ffestiniog Railway. Two of these are survivors from the original 19th century line; Merddin Emrys is still in service. Three were built new during the preservation era, the latest James Spooner, was completed in 2023.

Josephine, a Vulcan Foundry-built Double Fairlie, built in 1872 for the Dunedin and Port Chalmers Railway Company, survives as a static exhibit in Dunedin, New Zealand.

=== Péchot-Bourdon locomotives ===
These were a small Fairlie in all but name, with a few differences to allow a French patent to be granted in 1887. They were employed over short distances in French 600 mm military railways.

=== Mallet locomotives ===
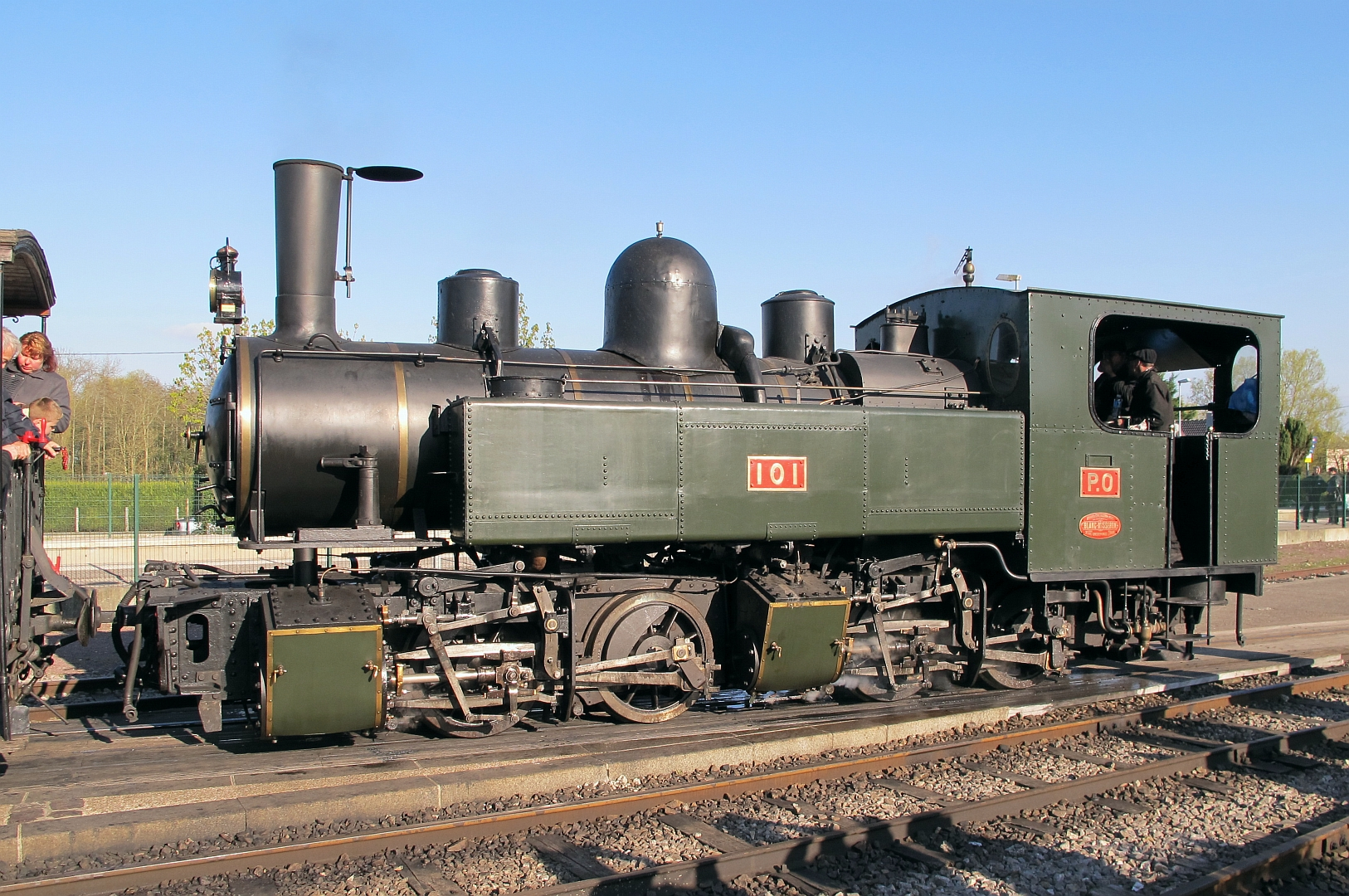
0-4-4-0T 1,000 mm Mallet of the PO Corrèze

The most numerous 0-4-4-0 locomotives were the Mallet design. These are articulated compound locomotives. The rear wheels and cylinders were fixed to the frames, as for a conventional locomotive. The front set formed a bogie that was pivoted at its rear and supported the front of the boiler on a sliding pad. As a compound, the lower pressure cylinders were always the swivelling bogie, as this only required the lower intermediate pressure to be passed through the pivoting steam pipe. The first of these was for a 600 mm Decauville light railway in 1887. Like the Fairlies, these were intended for narrow gauge lines built with tight curves. The most numerous 0-4-4-0T and 0-4-4-0TT Mallets were small locomotives of 600 mm and 750 mm gauge built for the Javan sugar plantations in the 1900s and 1910s by companies like Orenstein & Koppel and the Dutch Du Croo & Brauns, some of which were still operating into the 21st century.

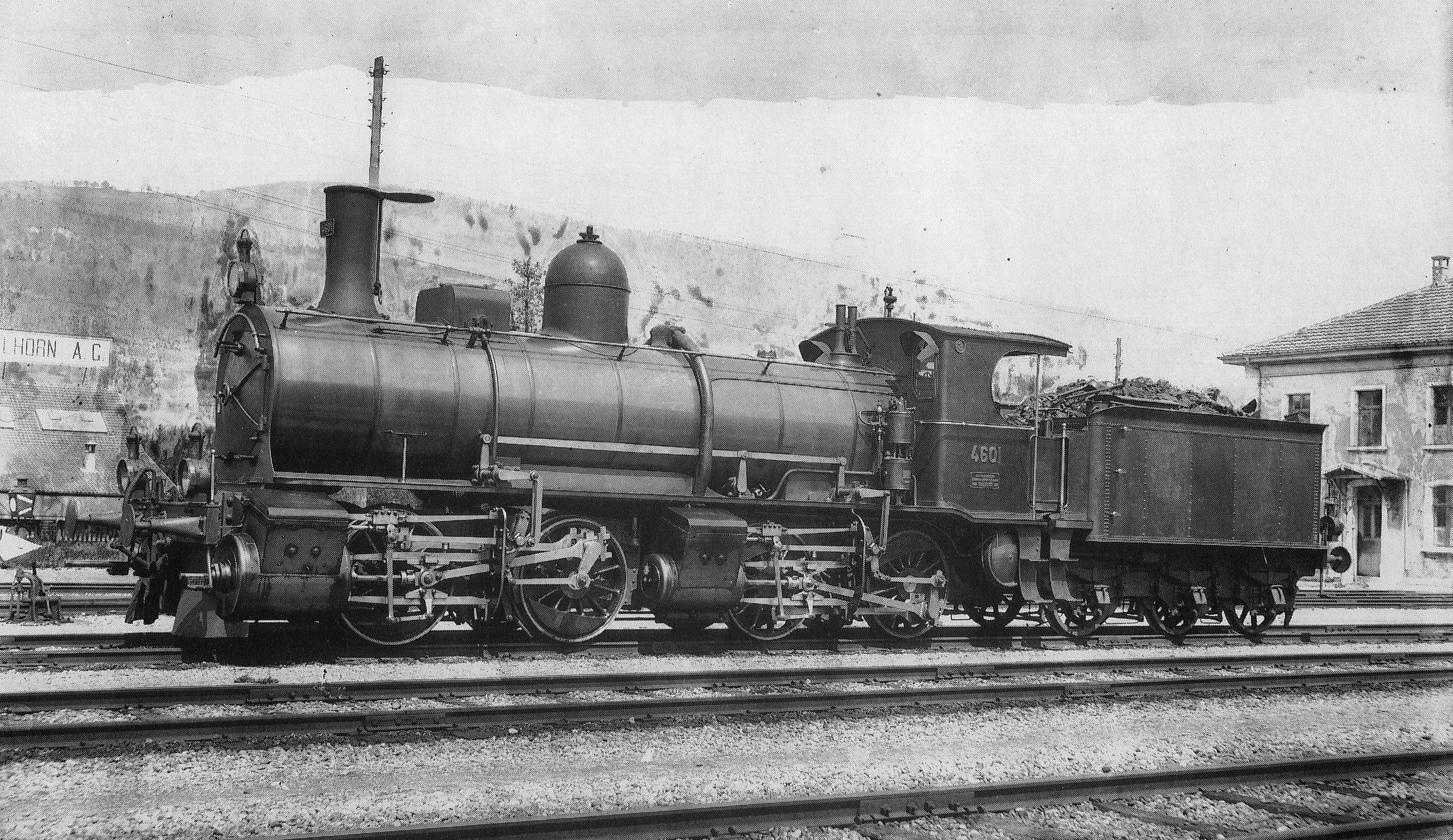
Swiss Central D 2×2/2 tender Mallet

Switzerland persisted with the 0-4-4-0T and 0-4-4-0 types and in the 1890s J.A. Maffei built classes of each for the standard gauge Swiss Central Railway.

The Mallet type developed and outgrew the original wheel arrangement, particularly in the US, also gaining tenders and often being simple expansion engines rather than compounds. A handful of Mallets in both Switzerland and Java expanded to 0-4-4-2T, to give support for enlarged water capacity. The Swiss design was not successful and was replaced in turn by a 2-4-4-0T.

== Eritrean Railways ==
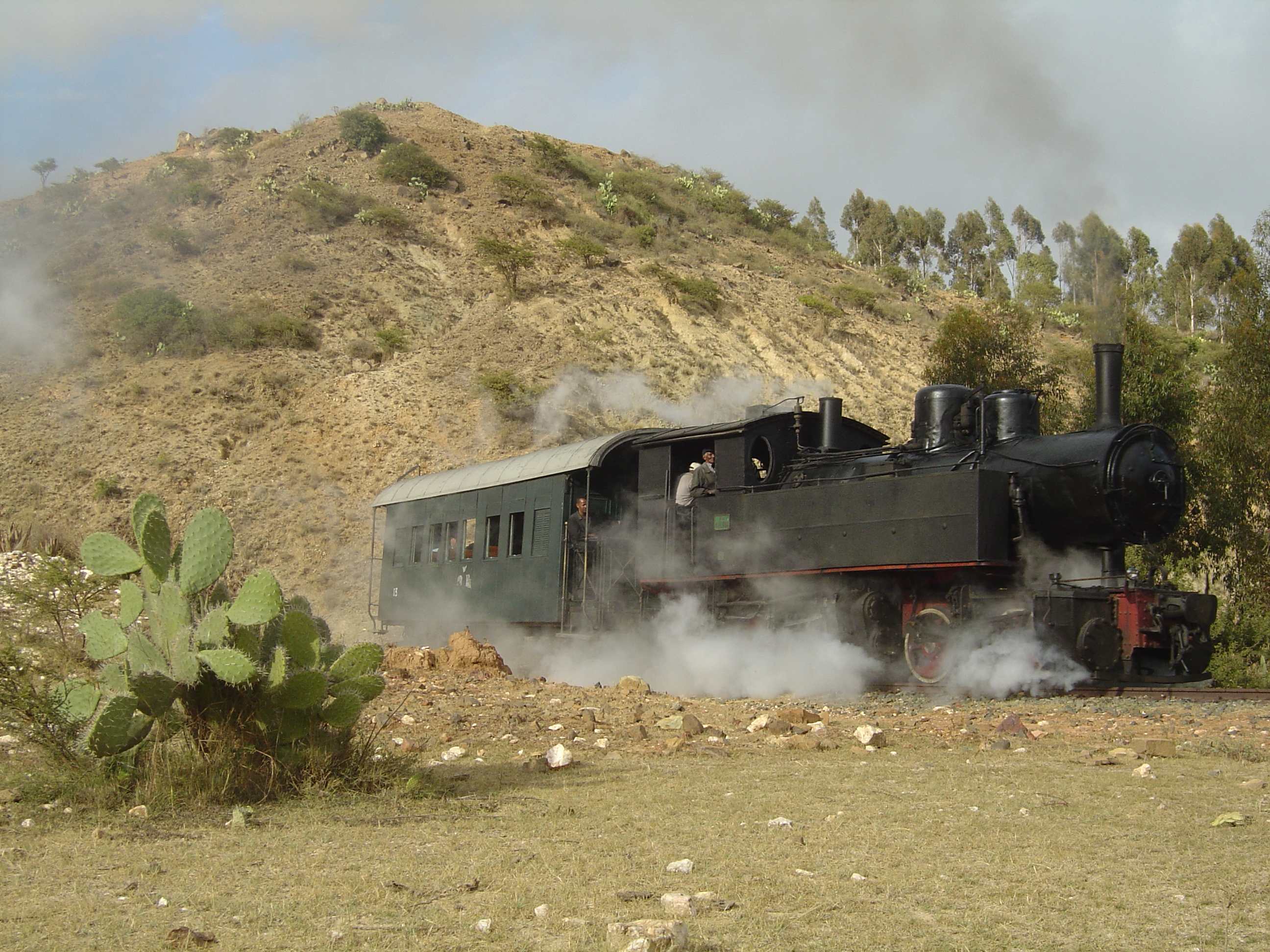
The surviving R.440 in Eritrea in 2008

Eritrean Railways used many 0-4-4-0Ts. The last was built in their own shops in 1963, making it the last Mallet built in the world.

From 1911, Italian State Railways built at least twelve 950 mm gauge Mallets as the FS R.440 class. These were used on the Palermo-Corleone-San Carlo Railway until the end of the 1920s, when they were relocated to Italian colonies in Eritrea.

== See also ==
- Jules Petiet, a French engineer who designed some unsuccessful classes of 0-6-6-0T rigid duplexes in the 1860s.
