= Festiniog Railway 0-4-0TT =

2 classes of 4+2 British 0-4-0TT locomotives

Ffestiniog Railway 0-4-0T+T
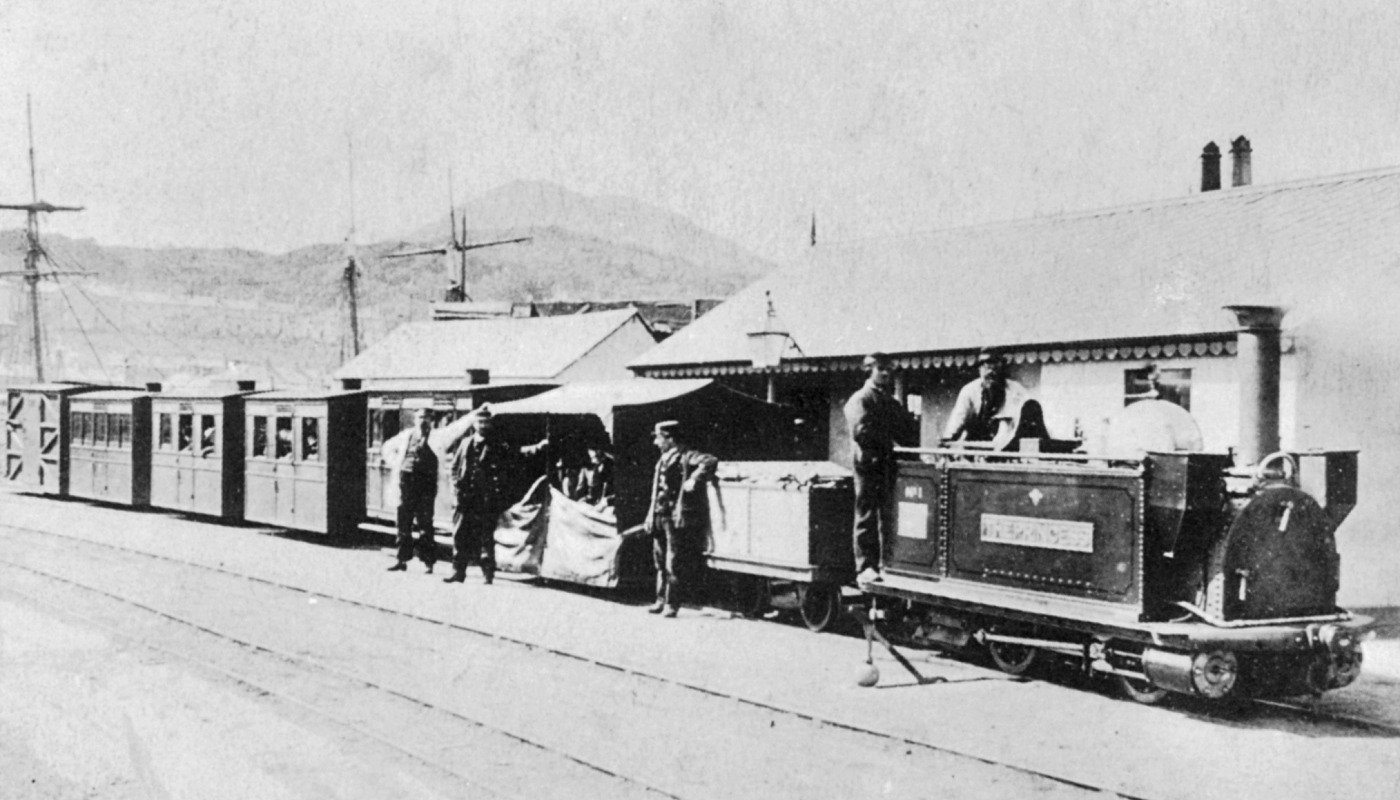
- The Princess at Harbour station in near original condition, around 1871
Type and origin
- Power type: Steam
- Builder: George England and Co.
- Build date: 1863-1867
- Total produced: 6
Specifications
- Configuration
  - Whyte: 0-4-0T+T
- Gauge: 1 ft 11 1/2 in (597 mm)
- Driver dia.: 2 ft 0 in (610 mm)
- Wheelbase: 1-4: 4 ft 6 in (1.37 m); 5-6: 5 ft 0 in (1.52 m)
- Loco weight: 1-4: 8 long tons (8.1 t; 9.0 short tons); 5-6: 10 long tons (10.2 t; 11.2 short tons)
- Water cap.: 1-4: 237 imp gal (1,080 L; 285 US gal); 5-6: 418 imp gal (1,900 L; 502 US gal)
- Boiler pressure: 1-4: 140 psi (965 kPa); 5-6: 150 psi (1,034 kPa)
- Cylinders: Two, outside
- Cylinder size: 1-4: 8 in × 12 in (203 mm × 305 mm); 5-6: 8.125 in × 12 in (206 mm × 305 mm)
- Valve gear: Allan straight link valve gear
Career
- Operators: Ffestiniog Railway, Welsh Highland Railway, Vale of Rheidol Railway
- Official name: 1: Princess; 2: Prince; 3: Mountaineer; 4: Palmerston; 5: Welsh Pony; 6: Little Giant
- Preserved: Four: Princess, Prince, Palmerston, Welsh Pony
- Disposition: Two scrapped, remainder preserved

The Ffestiniog Railway 0-4-0T+T were six 0-4-0T+T steam locomotives built by George England and Co. for the Ffestiniog Railway between 1863 and 1867. The locomotives were built to two designs: the first four were originally side tank locomotives and are collectively known as the Small England class; the final two locomotives were delivered with saddle tanks and are known as the Large England class.

The designation "T+T" indicates a tender-tank locomotive, which is a tank locomotive with a tender. In these locomotives, water is carried in tanks on the locomotive while fuel (coal) is carried in the tender.

== Small England class ==
The Ffestiniog Railway was originally built to be worked by gravity, with horses used to haul the empty slate wagons uphill from Porthmadog to Blaenau Ffestiniog. By the late 1850s it was clear that the line was reaching its carrying capacity, while the production from the slate quarries was continuing to expand. To increase the amount of slate that could be carried by the railway, in 1860 the board began investigating the use of steam locomotives for the railway. Although steam had been used on narrow gauge railways before this, it had only rarely been used on a gauge as narrow as the Ffestiniog's.

In 1862, the railway advertised in The Locomotive magazine asking for manufacturers to bid to supply an 0-6-0T locomotive to the railway. Although they received 29 expressions of interest, none were accepted. Charles Menzies Holland, who was acting as locomotive designer for the Ffestiniog Railway, approached George England, who lived near him in London. England agreed to bid for the contract and in February 1863 he proposed building three 0-4-0T locomotives primarily to his own design. This bid was accepted and construction began. England's design was for a small 0-4-0 locomotive with side tanks and tender. The locomotives had a low centre of gravity and were extremely small to fit within the restricted loading gauge of the railway.

The first two locomotives, Mountaineer and The Princess, arrived in July 1863. They were delivered without domes, over the objection of England. As a result, they suffered badly from priming and domes were hastily fitted in Wales before the locomotives could be run on service trains. The first formal steam-hauled train on the Festiniog Railway ran on 23 October 1863.

A fourth locomotive was added to the order and The Prince and Palmerston arrived in 1864. These were to the same basic design as the first two locomotives, but were delivered with domes already fitted. The introduction of the initial locomotives was a great success, allowing the railway to handle the increasing slate traffic and its first formal passenger trains.

No.	Name	Date built	Status	Notes
1	The Princess (later Princess)	1863	Static display	Rebuilt in 1882 with a cast iron weight giving the appearance of a saddle tank. In 1895 it was rebuilt with a saddle tank, cab and given the name Princess. It was reboilered in 1923 and worked the last train on the original railway in 1943. After preservation Princess remained in 1946 condition, although it was cosmetically restored in 1963 and 1981 and then displayed in Spooner's Bar at Harbour Station. In 2013 it was removed and repainted in a lined red livery and displayed at Paddington Station to celebrate its 150th. anniversary.
2	The Prince (later Prince)	1863, delivered 1864	In service	Overhauled in 1881 with cast iron weights. In 1890, a half-open cab was added. In 1892 a full cab, new boiler and saddle tank were fitted. Prince was withdrawn with a worn out boiler in 1936. In 1955 after preservation, Prince was the first steam locomotive restored. In 1962 new frames and cylinders were fitted but Prince was withdrawn in 1968. In 1980 Prince returned to traffic with superheating and a larger cab fitted and converted to oil firing. In 2013, Prince was again overhauled and converted back to coal firing.
3	Mountaineer	1863	Scrapped	Remained in substantially original condition, including side tanks for all of its working life. Withdrawn and dismantled 1879.
4	Palmerston	1864	In service	In 1880, Palmerston was the first of the Small Englands to receive a saddle-like cast iron weight. In 1886 this was replaced with a true saddle tank along with a new boiler and full cab. In 1891, the cab was shortened by 8 in (20 cm) to allow Palmerston to enter the slate wharves. In 1933 the boiler was repaired with parts from Little Giant but Palmerston was withdrawn in 1940 and was used as a stationary boiler at Boston Lodge during World War II. After preservation parts from Palmerston were used to restore Prince and the rusted remains were sold to a group in Staffordshire in 1974. In 1987 the remains of the locomotive were repatriated to the Festiniog Railway and restored to working order in 1993.

== Large England class ==
By 1867, traffic on the Festiniog Railway had outgrown the capabilities of the four new Small Englands, so an order for two further locomotives was placed with George England and Co. In the light of the experience with the initial class, these two new locomotives were built to a larger and improved design and they are known as the Large England class. Welsh Pony and Little Giant were delivered in 1867 and had saddle tanks fitted instead of side tanks. They also had a longer wheelbase and larger driving wheels than the Small Englands, to counteract the smaller locomotives' "violent vertical oscillations".

No.	Name	Date built	Status	Notes
5	Welsh Pony	1867	In service	Welsh Pony worked, with minor overhauls, until 1891 when most of its components were replaced and an overall cab fitted. In 1915 a new boiler was fitted and underwent a substantial overhaul for most of 1929. In 1939, Welsh Pony was withdrawn from traffic and left in the shed at Boston Lodge. In the 1960s and 1970s it was stored in the open and deteriorated significantly. In 1984 it was repainted red and put on display outside Harbour Station until 2002, when it was moved to Glan y Pwll shed. In 2013 the locomotive was cosmetically restored. On 27 June 2020 it was steamed after a full restoration.
6	Little Giant	1867	Dismantled by 1932	Little Giant was heavily used during its early years and underwent a 6-month major overhaul in 1875. With minor repairs, this saw the locomotive working until 1887 when the boiler, smokebox and chimney were replaced. In 1904, Little Giant was back at Boston Lodge for another boiler replacement, new cylinders and cab front-sheet. By 1932, the locomotive was withdrawn and parts were being used to rebuild other Englands. Some parts still survive.

== New Builds ==
In September 2019, a modern replica of Mountaineer was announced. Mountaineer III will be built to the as-delivered appearance of the Small Englands with side tanks instead of a saddle tank. The locomotive boiler completed a hydraulic pressure test in May 2020.

No.	Name	Date built	Status	Notes
3	Mountaineer III	Expected pre-2030 completion	Under construction	New build project

== In fiction ==
Duke, from The Railway Series and its televised adaptation, along with Bertram, are based on the Small England locomotives, more specifically No. 2 Prince.

== See also ==
- List of Ffestiniog Railway rolling stock
