= China Railways C2 =

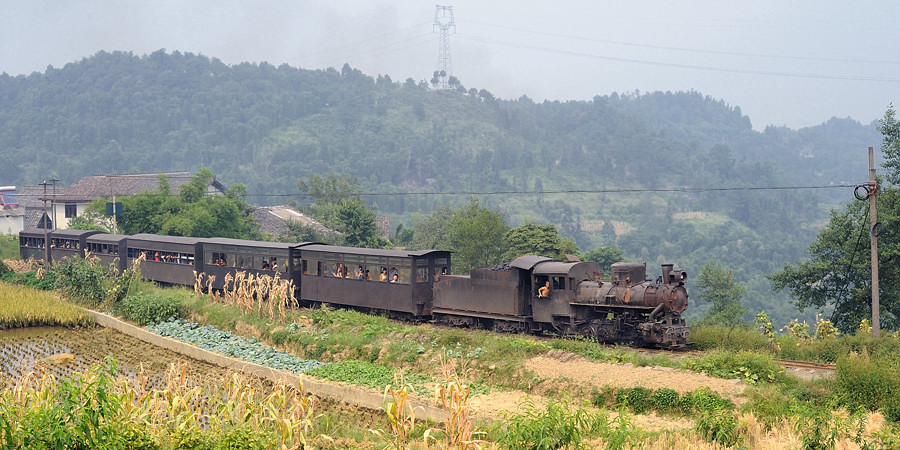
- C2 10 of Jiayang Coal Railway
Type and origin
- Power type: Steam
- Builder: Shijiazhuang, Mudanjiang, Harbin, Dunhua, Fablok (Note: The 87 Pt-4 imports were built by Fablok)
- Build date: 1952−1988
- Total produced: 912 (Note: 87 were imports of the Pt-4 and were classed as C2 remainder were built in China)
Specifications
- Configuration
  - Whyte: 0-8-0
- Gauge: 762 mm (2 ft 6 in)
- Driver dia.: 600 mm (2 ft 0 in)
- Fuel type: Coal
- Cylinders: Two, outside
Performance figures
- Maximum speed: 35 km/h (22 mph)
Career
- Operators: China Railway
- Class: C2
- Numbers: C2

The China Railways C2 is a type of 0-8-0 narrow-gauge steam locomotive built for the narrow-gauge Chinese network. They were built between 1952 and 1988 in several workshops across China and were based on the Russian Railway's class Pt-4. A total of 912 members of this class were built, with 87 being imports of the Russian Railway's Pt-4 class.

== History ==
The class's conception came about when the USSR and the Eastern Bloc had built several 0-8-0s and sent 87 members of their Pt-4 class to China their success in China and the Eastern Bloc soon prompted the Chinese to build 825 replicas of their own which continued until 1988. The PKP also produced similar locomotives for the Polish railway network as the PKP class Px48. The class were one of the most common and numerous narrow-gauge locomotives built in China and mainly saw use on forestry and coal railways. They were also the only class to use roller-bearing rods in China and had a long lifespan with some operating on industrial lines up into the 2010s.

== Preservation ==
Several members of this class are preserved in China, with some of the more well-known ones being preserved on tourist railways in Sichuan as well as several others in operating condition. One locomotive has been preserved and sent to the United Kingdom and is being restored for operation on the Ffestiniog Railway.
