= Victorian Railways J class (1859) =

Class of Australian 2-2-2 steam locomotives

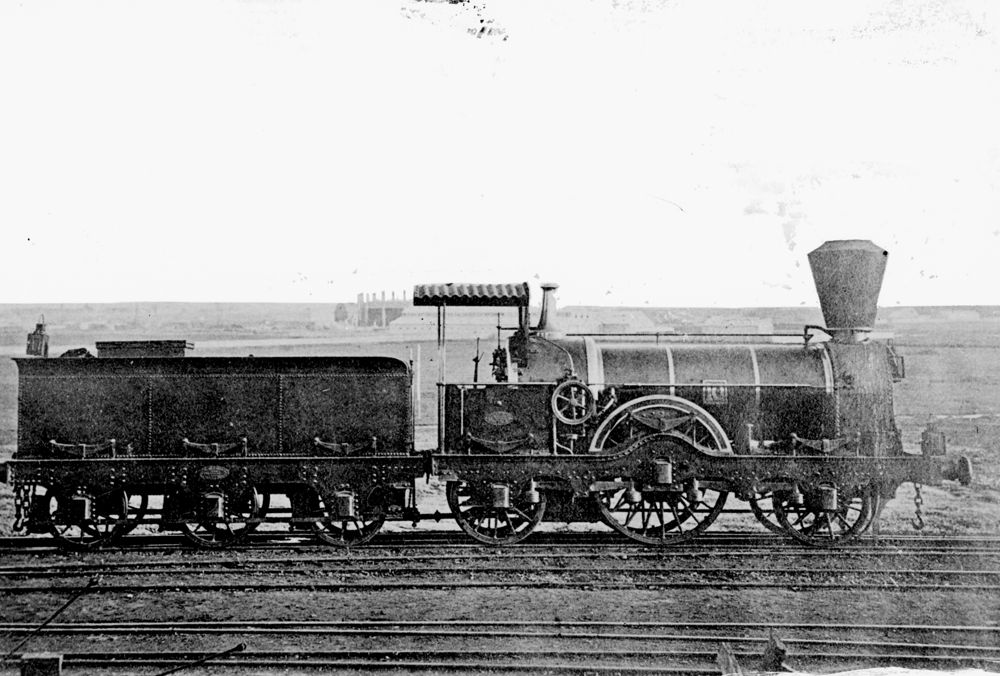
Type and origin
- Power type: Steam
- Builder: Beyer, Peacock & Company, Manchester, UK
- Serial number: 110 - 114
- Build date: 1859
- Total produced: 5
- Rebuild date: 1872
- Number rebuilt: 5
Specifications
- Configuration
  - Whyte: 2-2-2; Rebuilt 1872: 2-4-0
- Gauge: 5 ft 3 in (1,600 mm) Victorian broad gauge
- Leading dia.: Unknown; Rebuilt 1872: 3 ft 1 1/2 in (952 mm)
- Driver dia.: 6 ft 0 in (1,830 mm); Rebuilt 1872: 5 ft 0 in (1,520 mm)
- Trailing dia.: Unknown; Rebuilt 1872: N/A
- Tender wheels: 3 ft 6 in (1.07 m)
- Wheelbase: 31 ft 4 1/2 in (9.563 m); Rebuilt 1872: 33 ft 5 5/8 in (10.201 m); 1914 diagram: 31 ft 11 1/2 in (9.741 m)
  - Engine: Rebuilt 1872: 15 ft 10 in (4,830 mm)
  - Coupled: Rebuilt 1872: 7 ft 0 in (2,130 mm)
  - Tender: 11 ft 0 in (3.35 m); 1914 diagram: 9 ft 0 in (2.74 m)
- Length
  - Over couplers: Rebuilt 1872: 42 ft 0 1/8 in (12.805 m); 1914 diagram: 40 ft 4 in (12.29 m)
- Height: 13 ft 0 in (3.96 m)
- Axle load: 10 long tons 1 cwt 2 qr (22,570 lb or 10.24 t); 1914 diagram: 10 long tons 5 cwt (23,000 lb or 10.4 t)
- Loco weight: Rebuilt 1872: 27 long tons 3 cwt 1 qr (60,840 lb or 27.6 t); 1914 diagram: 27 long tons 10 cwt (61,600 lb or 27.9 t)
- Tender weight: Rebuilt 1872: 23 long tons 5 cwt 3 qr (52,160 lb or 23.66 t); 1914 diagram: 17 long tons 11 cwt (39,300 lb or 17.8 t)
- Total weight: Rebuilt 1872: 50 long tons 9 cwt (113,000 lb or 51.3 t); 1914 diagram: 45 long tons 1 cwt (100,900 lb or 45.8 t)
- Fuel capacity: 60 long cwt (6,700 lb or 3,000 kg)
- Water cap.: 1,710 imp gal (7,800 L; 2,050 US gal); 1914 diagram: 1,220 imp gal (5,500 L; 1,470 US gal)
- Firebox
  - Grate area: 13.00 sq ft (1.208 m^{2})
- Boiler pressure: Reboilered pre 1896: 2: 120 psi (827 kPa); 4 - 10: 130 psi (896 kPa); Reboilered 1896: 6: 140 psi (965 kPa); Reboilered 1908: 6: 130 psi (896 kPa); Re-rated 1912: 6: 100 psi (689 kPa)
- Heating surface
  - Firebox: 77.22 sq ft (7.174 m^{2})
  - Tubes: 937.92 sq ft (87.136 m^{2})
  - Total surface: 1,015.14 sq ft (94 m^{2})
- Cylinders: 2, inside
- Cylinder size: 14 in × 21 in (356 mm × 533 mm); 1894 diagram: 15 in × 22 in (381 mm × 559 mm)
Performance figures
- Tractive effort: 1904 diagram - 140psi: 9,240 lbf (41.1 kN); 1914 diagram: 8,580 lbf (38.2 kN) at 100 psi
Career
- Operators: Victorian Railways
- Number in class: 5
- Numbers: 2-6, 1860: 2-10 (even only)
- Delivered: 1860
- First run: May 1860
- Last run: 9 November 1912 (52.5 years)
- Withdrawn: 1904 - 1912
- Disposition: All scrapped

The Victorian Railways J class of 1859 was a class of 2-2-2 main line passenger locomotives operated by the Victorian Railways between 1860 and 1912, built by Beyer, Peacock & Company, Manchester, England.

== History ==
Victorian Railways initially numbered passenger and goods locomotives separately. The engines were numbered 2–6 (sharing numbers with the V Class goods locomotives). This was changed in the late 1860s to odd numbers for goods locomotives and even numbers for passenger locos with these locomotives taking the even numbers 2–10. This odd and even system remained in use until 1912. In 1886, they were allocated to Class J.

=== Production ===
The five locomotives were built in 1859 with builder's numbers 110–114 at an average cost of £3774-3-7 for each loco. They arrived in Port Phillip in March 1860.

=== Regular service ===
J2 was one of the locos used to haul the Victorian Railways Royal Train for Prince Alfred Duke of Edinburgh during his visit in 1867.
In 1894, three were allocated to Bendigo and two to Geelong.
From 1908, J4 and J6 were used for motor service.

=== Design improvements ===
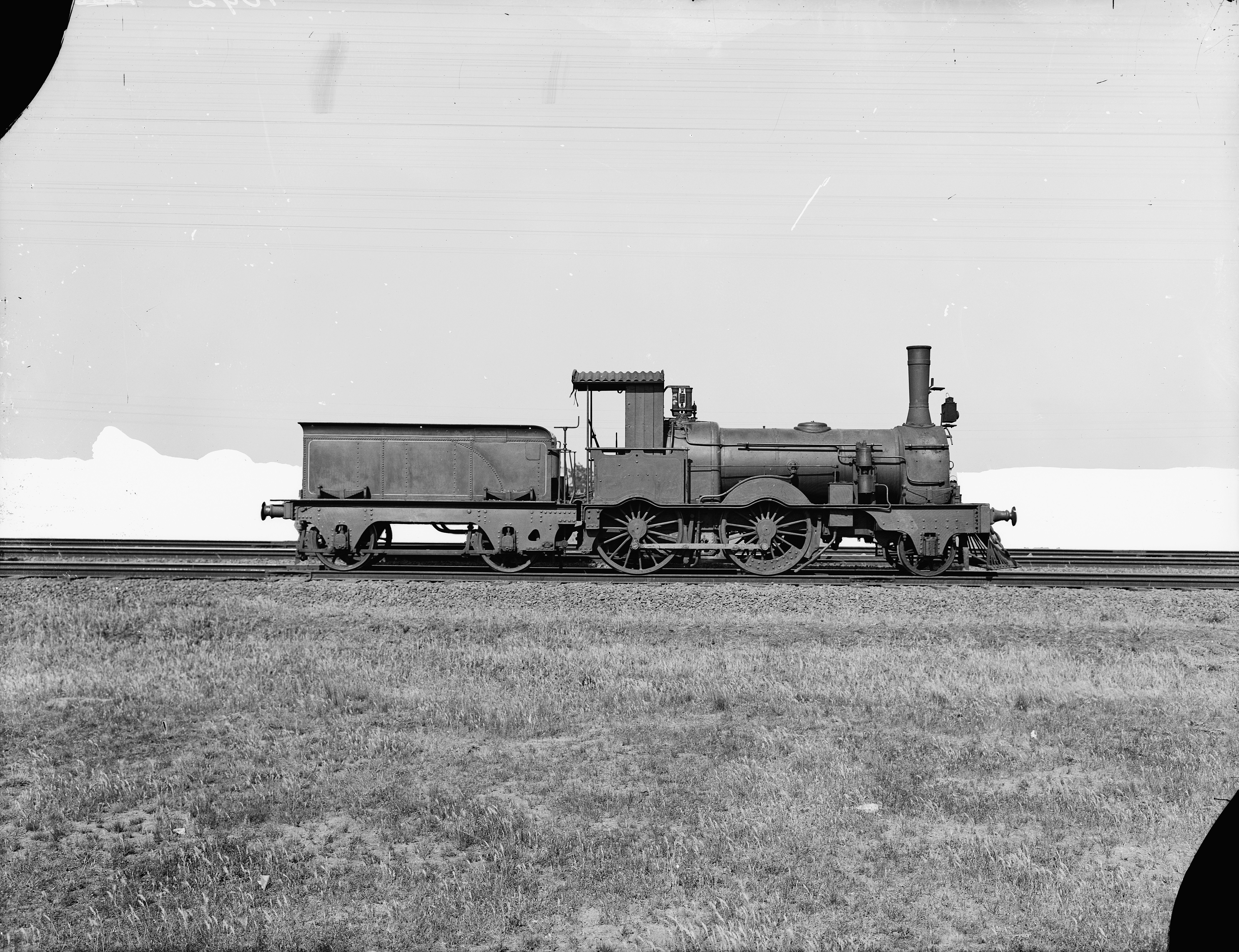
J Class Steam Locomotive side view converted to 2-4-0 configuration photographed at North Melbourne.

In about 1872, they were rebuilt to 2-4-0 wheel arrangement to improve adhesion and allow greater tractive effort to cope with heavier loads and steeper gradients on the new routes.
Over the years they were fitted with various alterations to the cabs. There were also various upgrades over the years; with constant improvements to safety — these including things like updates to safety valves (and domes), smokeboxs and chimneys (with spark arrestors), and brakes.
At some point before 1894 they were reboilered and the new boiler pressures varied from 120–130psi. J6 received another two boilers, the first in 1896, and again in 1908. In 1908–09 J4 and J6 were modified for motor service. This involved fitting air brakes and cowcatchers, reducing the size of the tenders (using spare 4 wheel versions from previously scrapped locomotives), and the addition of footplats and handrails on the tenders to allow guards to return to the engine while the train was moving.

=== Accidents ===
- 11 April 1895 - J4 broke driving wheels at Lancefield

=== Demise ===
J2 and J8 were withdrawn in 1904. In 1907, the cylinders and frame of J10 were used as a stationary engine at Newport Workshops to drive forging machines. J4 sold to Mr Findlay of Serviceton for £700 in 1912. After being withdrawn from service in 1912, J6 was used as a hot water engine until being reported as broken up on 19 February 1916. It reappeared as a hot water engine at Geelong and last reported in a boiler test on 9 March 1917.

== Fleet summary ==
Key:	In service	Preserved	Stored or withdrawn	Scrapped

Locomotive	Previous numbers	Builder no.	Entered service	Withdrawn	Scrapped	Status	Notes
J2	2	110	May 1860	23 April 1904		Scrapped	
J4	4	112	July 1860	9 November 1912		Scrapped	Sold to Mr Findlay of Serviceton (£700) - 9 November 1912
J6	6	114	August 1860	10 August 1912		Scrapped	Hot water engine - 10 August 1912. Broken up? - 19 February 1916. Last seen - 9 March 1917
J8	3	111	June 1860	5 July 1904		Scrapped	
J10	5	113	July 1860	28 April 1907		Scrapped	Stationary engine at Newport - 29 April 1907
