= Richard Thomas =

Richard Thomas or Dick Thomas may refer to:

== Arts, entertainment and media ==
- Dick Thomas (singer) (1915–2003), American singing cowboy and actor
- Richard Thomas (actor) (born 1951), American actor
- Richard Thomas (author) (born 1967), American author
- Richard Thomas (dancer) (1925–2013), American dancer
- Richard Thomas (musician) (born 1964), British musician, writer, and comedy actor
- Richard Thomas, drummer on The Jesus and Mary Chain album Automatic
- Richard K. Thomas (born 1953), live theatre sound and composition advocate

== Government and politics ==
- Richard Thomas (Pennsylvania politician) (1744–1832), US congressman from Pennsylvania
- Richard L. Thomas (1809–1888), American politician from Maryland
- Richard L. Thomas Jr. (1856–1898), American politician from Maryland
- Richard Thomas (Royal Navy officer) (1932–1998), admiral and Black Rod in the House of Lords
- Richard C. Thomas (1937–1991), politician and government official in Vermont
- Richard V. Thomas (1932–2010), justice of the Wyoming Supreme Court
- Richard Thomas (solicitor) (born 1949), British lawyer and former information commissioner

== Religion ==
- Richard Thomas (bishop) (1881–1958), Anglican bishop and archdeacon in Australia
- Richard Thomas (priest) (1753–1780), Welsh Anglican priest and antiquarian
- Richard Rice Thomas (died 1942), archdeacon of St Davids

== Sports ==
- Dick Thomas (rugby league), Welsh rugby league footballer
- Dick Thomas (rugby union) (1883–1916), Welsh rugby union footballer
- Richard Thomas (cricketer, born 1792) (1792–1881), English cricketer
- Richard Thomas (cricketer, born 1867) (1867–1918), English cricketer
- Richard Thomas (shooter) (1941–2016), American shooter, instrumental in establishing International Defensive Pistol Association
- Richie Thomas (Richard James Thomas, born 1942), Welsh cricketer
- Ritchie Thomas (Richard John Harold Thomas, 1915–1988), Australian rules footballer

== Other people ==
- Richard Thomas (civil engineer) (1779–1858), English civil engineer
- Richard Thomas (herpetologist) (born 1938), American herpetologist
- Richard Thomas (mathematician), professor of mathematics at Imperial College London
- Richard Thomas (tin plate manufacturer) (1837–1916), British manufacturer and founder of Richard Thomas & Co Ltd.
- Richard Thomas (Zarvona) (1833–1875), Confederate colonel and privateer known as "the French lady" during the American Civil War
- Richard Darton Thomas (1777–1857), Royal Navy officer
- Richard G. Thomas (1930–2006), American pilot
- Richard Grenfell Thomas (1901–1974), Australian mineralogist
- Richard F. Thomas (born 1950), professor of classics at Harvard University
- Richard Walter Thomas (born 1936), professor known for his work on black issues and race relations

== See also ==
- Richard Beaumont-Thomas (1860–1917), managing director of Richard Thomas & Co Ltd.
- Ricky Thomas (born 1965), American football player
