= Thomas Dick =

Thomas Dick may refer to:

- Thomas Dick (politician) (1823–1900), New Zealand politician
- Thomas Dick (scientist) (1774–1857), Scottish church minister, science teacher and writer
- Thomas Dick (hotelier) (1809–1874), of Queen's Hotel, Toronto
- Thomas Pattinson Dick (1903–1979), English badminton international

== See also ==
- Thomas Dick-Lauder
- Dick Thomas (disambiguation)
- Tom, Dick and Harry
