= Thomas Hall (railway engineer) =

British railway engineer (1823-1889)

- Born: Richard Thomas Hall; May 31, 1823
- Died: August 21, 1889 (aged 66)
- Occupation: railway engineer

Richard Thomas Hall (31 May 1823 – 21 August 1889) was a British railway engineer.

== Early life ==
In 1839 he became pupil of his uncle, civil engineer Richard Thomas. After his pupilage in 1844 Thomas Hall was employed by civil engineer Joseph Locke.

== Railway career ==
In 1848 he was appointed engineer and superintendent of the 4 ft (1,219 mm) gauge Redruth and Chasewater Railway in Cornwall for the next 20 years.

== South Africa ==
In 1868, the Cape Copper Mining Company hired Thomas Hall to survey and construct the 2 ft 6 in (762 mm) narrow gauge Namaqualand Railway in the Cape Colony. In March 1875, one year before the completion of the railway, Thomas Hall accepted the appointment of railway engineer to the South African Republic and started surveying the 3 ft 6 in (1,067 mm) gauge Pretoria to Delagoa Bay railway of the Netherlands-South African Railway Company.

When the South African Republic became British territory in 1878, he became maintenance engineer and retired from government service in 1886. He died on 21 August 1889.

== Other narrow gauge pioneers ==
- Abraham Fitzgibbon
- Carl Abraham Pihl
- Everard Calthrop
- Paul Decauville
- Robert Fairlie
