= Timmis system =

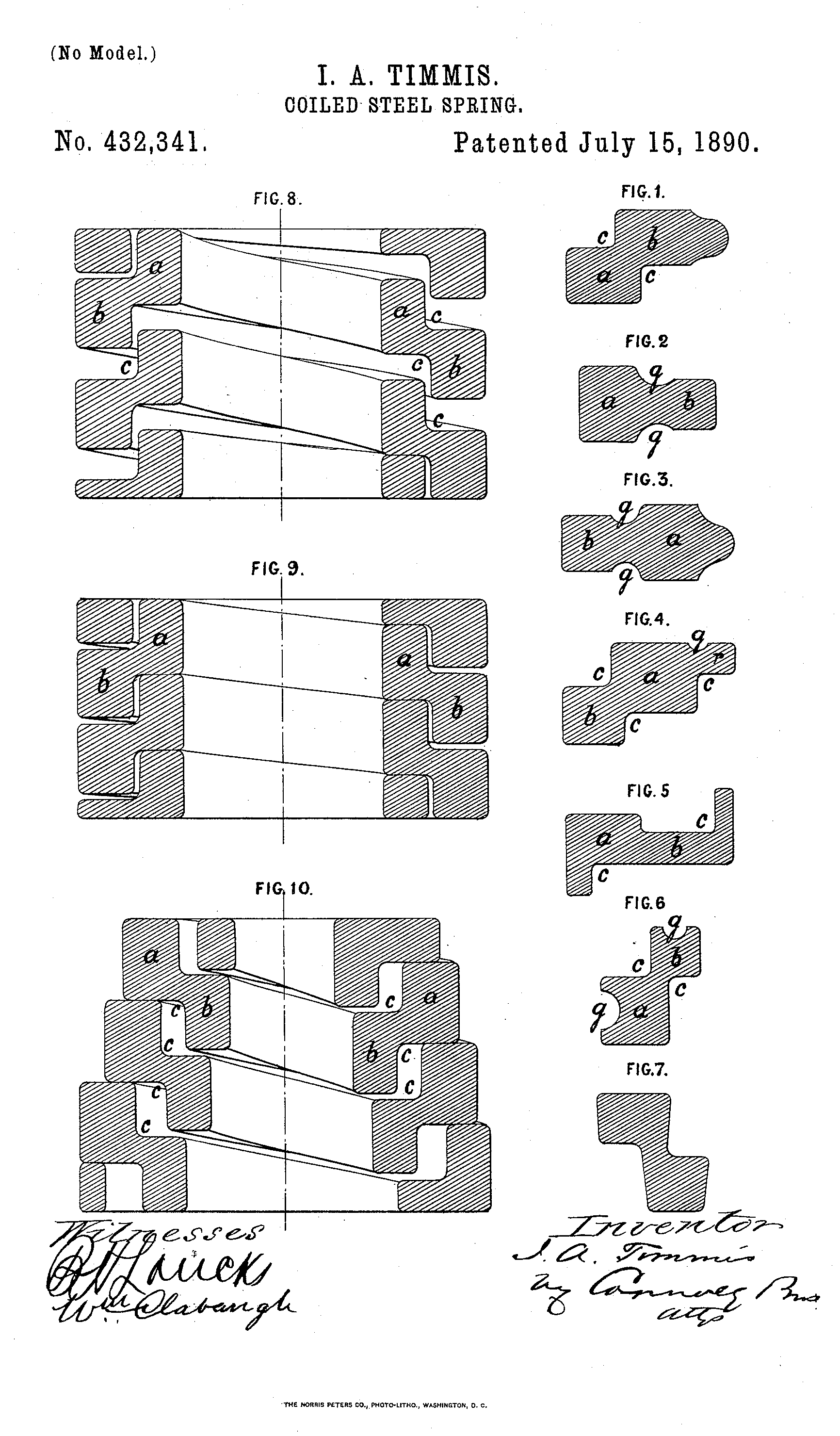
Patent drawing

Timmis was an innovative design of double coiled springs, originally used for railway rolling stock, such as on the Barsi Light Railway c1889, as formulated by Everard Calthrop (1857–1927).

== Inventor ==
The inventor was Illius Augustus Timmis

== Patent ==
US Patent 432341 was filled in 1889 and published in 1890.

== See also ==
- Bogie as used with railway rolling stock.
- Coil spring
- Leaf spring - an older and simpler system of springs
