= Abraham Fitzgibbon =

Australian engineer

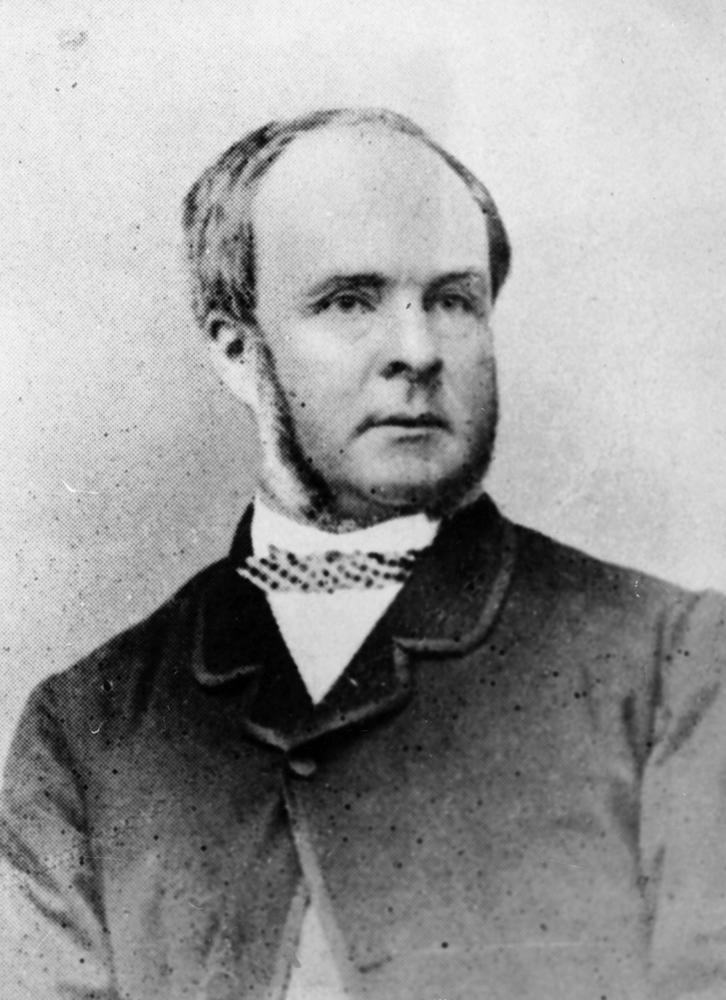
- Abraham Fitzgibbon circa 1863
- Born: Abraham Coates Fitz-Gibbon; 23 January 1823; Ireland
- Died: 4 April 1887 (aged 64); Bushey Heath, England
- Education: Chalmers University of Technology
- Occupation: Engineer
- Employer: Queensland Rail
- Known for: Railway pioneer
- Spouse: Isabelle Stovin
- Children: 5
- Parent(s): Philip Fitzgibbon; Elizabeth Coates

Abraham 'Abram' Fitzgibbon (23 January 1823 – 4 April 1887) was an Irish-born railroad engineer and a pioneer for narrow-gauge railways.

== Career ==
In the early 1860s, Fitzgibbon was working at Dun Mountain Railway in Nelson, New Zealand, a horse-drawn line upon which he worked from 1860 (3 ft / 914 mm gauge)

Fitzgibbon arrived in the colony of Queensland in June 1863. He was appointed first chief engineer of Queensland Railways after a rise through the ranks in the early stages of the railway department development. The first operations of the Queensland Railways opened in 1865.

There was debate regarding the choice of gauge, 3 ft 6 in (1,067 mm) versus 4 ft 8 1/2 in (1,435 mm) standard gauge. It is claimed that Fitzgibbon said that the narrow gauge would be sufficient to last 25 or 30 years and was cheaper. Despite opposition from contemporaries, he successfully advocated for the use of narrow gauge or 3 ft 6 in (1,067 mm) track in Australia. By 1867, the controversies included the termination of Fitzgibbon's contract.

== Death and legacy ==
Fitzgibbon died on 4 April 1887 at Moorside, Bushey Heath, Hertfordshire, England.

The Fitzgibbon suburb of Brisbane is named after Abraham Fitzgibbon.

Queensland railways continue to be 1,067 mm (3 ft 6 in) gauge to the present day.

== See also ==
- Three foot six inch gauge railways

Other narrow gauge pioneers in order of influence:

- Carl Abraham Pihl (1825–1897) known for the Norwegian Railways opened 1863; 1,067 mm (3 ft 6 in)
- Robert Fairlie (1831–1885) known for the Fairlie locomotive on Festiniog Railway introduced about 1865. 1 ft 11 1/2 in (597 mm) gauge.
- Thomas Hall (1823–1889) known for the Namaqualand Railway built 1868; 762 mm (2 ft 6 in) gauge
- Paul Decauville (1846–1922) known for the Decauville system introduced 1875
- Everard Calthrop (1857–1927) known for the Barsi Light Railway opened 1897; 762 mm (2 ft 6 in) gauge.
