= Paul Decauville =

French engineer and businessman (1846-1922)

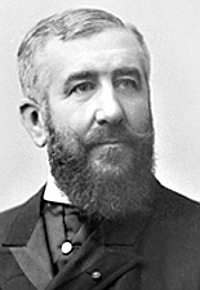
- Born: 7 June 1846
- Died: 1922 (aged 75–76)
- Occupations: Engineer and businessman

Paul Decauville (French pronunciation: [pɔl dəkovil]; 7 June 1846–1922) was a French engineer and businessman. He was also mayor of Evry-Petit Bourg and senator from Seine-et-Oise.

He is the founder of a manufacturing company that bears his name (Decauville, established in 1875), producing industrial railways, locomotives, and cars. By extension, the name is also used for his invention of a narrow gauge track railway system, the Decauville system, through the vast business acumen of its promoter. His name was also used for a subsidiary, Voitures automobiles Decauville, producing early automobiles. Decauville's name is further associated with the towns of Corbeil-Essonnes and Evry, Essonne, on whose territories the company Decauville erected its factories, which he directed until 1885.

He founded a construction company in 1910 to exploit the patents it had obtained. This company, Comptoir d'outillage et de matériel à air comprimé (Commercial establishment for tools and compressed air equipment), survived until the late 1980s. Another of his companies, Emidecau, specializing in hydraulic presses, still exist.

In politics, Paul Decauville was mayor of Evry-Petit Bourg from 1881 to 1892. He was also Senator of Seine-et-Oise from 1890 to 1900, member of the Board of Customs, Secretary from 1897 to 1899. After leaving Paris, Paul Decauville served as mayor of the town of Saint-Léger (Manche).

== Other narrow gauge pioneers ==
- Abraham Fitzgibbon
- Carl Abraham Pihl
- Everard Calthrop
- Robert Fairlie
- Thomas Hall
