= Everard Calthrop =

British civil engineer

- Born: Everard Richard Calthrop; 3 March 1857; Deeping St Nicholas, UK
- Died: 30 March 1927 (aged 70); Paddington, London, UK
- Occupation: Railway engineer
- Known for: Developing the Barsi Light Railway in India and the Leek and Manifold Light Railway in England.

Everard Richard Calthrop (3 March 1857 – 30 March 1927) was a British railway engineer and inventor. Calthrop was a notable promoter and builder of narrow-gauge railways, especially of 2 ft 6 in (762 mm) narrow gauge, and was especially prominent in India. His most notable achievement was the Barsi Light Railway, but he is best known in his home country for the Leek and Manifold Valley Light Railway. Calthrop has been described as a "railway genius". Later in life he took an interest in aviation, patenting some early designs for parachutes.

== Early life and career ==
Calthrop was born on 3 March 1857, the eldest son of farmer Everard Calthrop. He had six brothers, one of whom was Sir Guy Calthrop, general manager of the London and North Western Railway. The family lived at Deeping Fen, Lincolnshire, where Calthrop was born, and later at Sutton in the Isle of Ely. Calthrop was educated at Uppingham School.

Calthrop started work with Robert Stephenson and Company and then was apprenticed to the London & North Western Railway at Crewe in 1874. In 1879 he joined the Great Western Railway, where he rose to assistant manager of the Carriage and Wagon Works. In 1882 he went to India to join the Great Indian Peninsula Railway as a locomotive inspector.

Once in India, Calthrop came to see narrow-gauge railways as a way to help develop the country. This led him to chairing a Government committee to investigate light railways throughout India. He then published a pamphlet entitled A System of Standard Details as applied to the Construction of Rolling Stock in India. As a result of this pamphlet, the Indian Government adopted systems of uniformity of gauge and equipment throughout the country, and eventually adopted 2 ft 6 in (762 mm) gauge as the standard narrow gauge throughout the country.

Calthrop requested leave in 1886 to investigate proposals for independent branch lines. He identified two schemes of particular interest, a 5-mile (8 km) tramway connecting the Hindu religious centre of Nasik with the railway, and a 21-mile (34 km) branch line to the town of Barsi. The Great Indian Peninsula Railway approved both schemes, and Calthrop surveyed both lines. In 1887, he registered the Indian Railways Feeder Lines Company in London to promote the construction of feeders to the railway. The Great Indian Peninsula Railway suggested that he either return to his duties as a locomotive inspector or, with their support, resign to further promote branch lines. His health was failing, and so in 1889 Calthrop resigned from the Great Indian Peninsula Railway. Working as a consultant he then supervised the construction of the 2 ft 6 in (762 mm) gauge horse-powered Nasik Tramway, using his previous survey.

== Move to Liverpool ==
Returning to the United Kingdom in 1892, Calthrop established a railway engineering consulting practice in Liverpool, where three of his brothers had started a stockfeed company. Soon Calthrop had entered into a partnership with them and spent much of the next two years designing equipment for feed production. He took out a number of patents relating to the equipment and to refrigerated transport.

While Calthrop was resident in Liverpool, the Chamber of Commerce was concerned future expansion was being limited by the railway companies that linked that city with Manchester, and invited proposals for alternative methods for moving goods. Calthrop proposed a system of narrow-gauge railways linking the two cities, running along streets directly serving factories. His proposal was highly commended, but the proposed street running precluded its adoption.

Calthrop was also interested in road transport. He was a member of the Self-Propelled Traffic Association and in May 1898 was a judge at their trials for "motor vehicles for heavy traffic", held in Liverpool. The winner was a Thornycroft 4-ton steam wagon. Later he was a foundation member of the Royal Automobile Club.

== Development of narrow-gauge concepts and the Barsi Light Railway ==
During his time in India Calthrop developed his ideas on the construction of narrow-gauge railways. He surmised that the axle load on the axles of all rolling stock, including locomotives, could be equal, allowing a maximum loading of goods wagons. He settled on a loading of 5 long tons (5.1 t; 5.6 short tons) per axle, which was light enough to allow railway lines to be built with 30 pounds per yard (14.9 kilograms per metre) rail. It also allowed the loading of one 20 long tons (20.3 t; 22.4 short tons) capacity 4-wheel standard-gauge wagon to be carried on a single bogie narrow-gauge wagon. Further, he argued that using a track gauge of 2 ft 6 in (762 mm) gave the greatest capacity as a percentage of capital cost. He estimated a 2 ft 6 in (762 mm) gauge railway could be built to four times the length of a standard-gauge railway for the same capital cost.

Calthrop had been engaged in negotiations with the Indian government for concessions to build a railway from Barsi Road to Barsi since 1887. In 1895, negotiations reached a satisfactory conclusion, and Calthrop formed a new company to build the Barsi Light Railway, and employed himself as consulting engineer. The railway became a showcase for his ideas. Five 0-8-4T locomotives, with even distribution of axle load, were constructed to Calthrop's specification by Kitson & Co. The goods rolling stock was constructed on common 25 by 7 feet (7.6 m × 2.1 m) pressed steel underframes, reducing tare weight and maximising potential wagon loads.

Calthrop recognised the importance of railways in warfare, and designed the rolling stock to facilitate the movement of troops and equipment. Rolling stock rode on pressed-steel Fox bogies, using the Timmis system of double coiled springs. The line was constructed with rail inclination, then a new idea, which involves tilting the rail a few degrees to make its surface more nearly parallel with that of the tyre. Inclination is now applied universally to railways. The rolling stock could accept 100-foot (30.48 m) radius curves.

Prior to shipment of the rolling stock to India, Calthrop and the manufacturer (Leeds Forge Company) conducted tests on a specially-built test track located at Newlay, near Leeds. The line was opened for inspection by railway officials and journalists, and a number of reports were published in the technical railway press.

The Barsi Light Railway opened in 1897, and was extended on a number of occasions until it reached a total length of 202 miles (325 km) in 1927. The line is seen as having revolutionised the narrow-gauge railway system on Indian subcontinent, and the railway was immensely successful, establishing Calthrop as one of the leading figures in the field. Calthrop remained consulting engineer until he retired due to poor health two years before his death. The Barsi Light Railway continued to be operated as a privately owned railway until 1954 when it was purchased by the Indian government, and continued to operate as a narrow-gauge railway until conversion to broad gauge began in the late 1990s as part of Indian Railways conversion program for all metre- and narrow-gauge lines.

== Involvement in other railways ==
With the success of the Barsi Light Railway, Calthrop was in demand as a consultant for other narrow-gauge railway projects.

=== Barbados Railway ===
The Barbados Railway opened in 1883 as a 3 ft 6 in (1,067 mm) gauge railway from Bridgetown to St Andrew, Barbados. By 1897, the railway and its rolling stock was in very poor condition. Further, much of the railway had been constructed with rail too light for the locomotives. A new company was established in 1898 to rebuild and operate the railway, and Calthrop was engaged as consulting engineer. Calthrop arranged for the railway to be rebuilt in 2 ft 6 in (762 mm) gauge, and had Baldwin Locomotive Works build four new locomotives, two 2-8-2T's, a 2-6-0T and an 0-6-0T.

=== Welshpool and Llanfair Light Railway ===
Calthrop appeared at the Light Railway Inquiry for the Welshpool and Llanfair Light Railway on 3–4 August 1897, and spoke particularly on the proposed open level crossings and the use of transporter wagons. Calthrop claimed it only took three minutes to transfer wagons, based on his experience on the Barsi Light Railway. However, the order was not made until 8 September 1899, and in early 1900, the proprietors reached agreement with the Cambrian Railways to build the line. Their engineer, Alfred J. Collins, took charge of the engineering requirements, with consequent conservative 4-wheel wagons and other provisions.

=== Victorian Railways narrow-gauge lines ===
In 1898 Calthrop corresponded with the government of the colony of Victoria, Australia, regarding proposals for the construction of narrow-gauge lines in that colony. Subsequently, on his advice, the gauge of the railways as built was changed from 2 ft (610 mm) to 2 ft 6 in (762 mm).

=== Fayoum Light Railway ===
Calthrop was appointed to advise on engineering matters for this 750 mm (2 ft 5 1/2 in) gauge Egyptian light railway, construction of which began in 1898. The railway comprised seven, mostly roadside, branch lines with a total length of 97 miles (156 km). The Fayoum Light Railway served an irrigation district south of Cairo, centred on the provincial capital of Medinet-el-Fayum. Calthrop used pictures of rolling stock from the railway to illustrate a chapter he wrote for the book Pioneer Irrigation and Light Railways.

=== Serbian narrow-gauge railways ===
Calthrop was one of several foreign concessionaires involved with the initial development of 760 mm (2 ft 5 15/16 in) Bosnian gauge gauge railways in Serbia after 1898.

=== Cleobury Mortimer and Ditton Priors Light Railway ===
The Cleobury Mortimer and Ditton Priors Light Railway was a 12.3-mile (19.8 km) long standard-gauge branch line linking the Great Western Railway at Cleobury Mortimer in Shropshire with mineral deposits in the Clee Hills. Calthrop was appointed Consulting Engineer in 1900, responsible for surveying the route and preparing the construction plans.

=== Leek and Manifold Valley Light Railway ===
In the United Kingdom Calthrop is most associated with the Leek and Manifold Valley Light Railway. The line had been promoted under the Light Railways Act, and the initial plan was to build a railway of 2 ft 6 in (762 mm) gauge to be powered by electricity. Under the influence of one of the Light Railway Commissioners the company directors commissioned a report on the proposed line from Calthrop in mid-1900. In early December the railway's engineer died, and on 19 December 1900 the Directors sat down to consider both a replacement and Calthrop's report. Calthrop proposed specifications for the line which would result in substantial savings in construction costs, and so he was offered the position of engineer, which he promptly accepted.

Calthrop constructed the line for £35,944, £11,000 less than the original estimate. He had Kitson & Co construct two 2-6-4T locomotives, similar in outline but smaller than the Barsi Light Railway locomotives. Goods rolling stock included four coaches, two bogie open wagons and one bogie van, once again similar to Barsi stock. He also introduced four transporter wagons, designed to transport standard-gauge wagons. Each station on route had a short section of standard-gauge track where the wagons could be placed. The use of transporter wagons eliminated transshipment, and removed the need for large numbers of goods wagons.

=== Matheran Light Railway ===
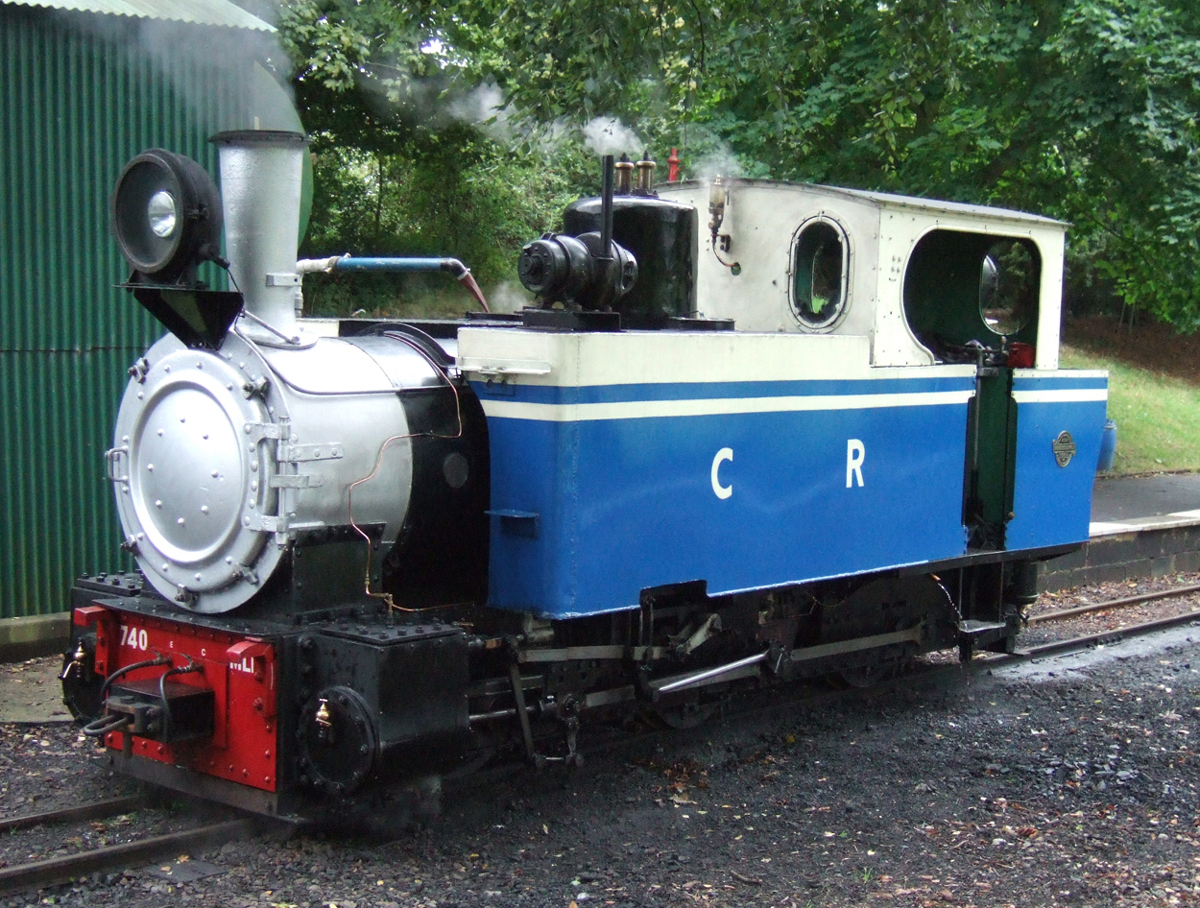
O&K locomotive designed by Calthrop and used on the Matheran Light Railway, seen bere at Leighton Buzzard Narrow Gauge Railway

The Matheran Light Railway is a mountain railway near Mumbai, India, and opened in 1905. Unusually for a railway for which Caltrhrop was consulting engineer, it was of 2 ft (610 mm) gauge, with tight curves and 1 in 20 (5%) grades. Calthrop designed a 0-6-0T with Klein-Linder articulated coupled axles to provide a flexible wheelbase, and four were supplied by Orenstein & Koppel. Calthrop's firm also supplied the wagon stock and the points and crossings for the railway.

=== Arakan Light Railway ===
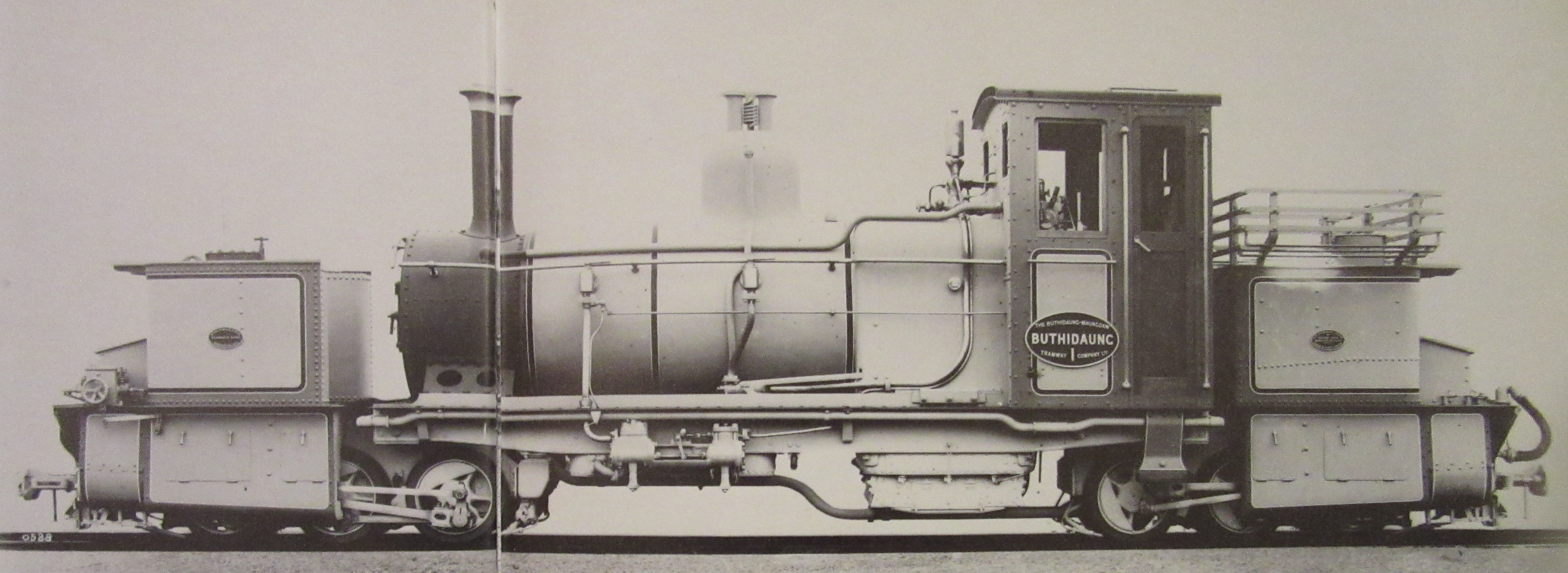
One of the Garratt locomotives supplied to the Arakan Light Railway

In 1910 Calthrop was engaged as consulting engineer by the promoters of a new railway between Buthidaung and Maungdaw in Burma, later known as the Arakan Light Railway. Calthrop had the proposed gauge changed from 2 ft (610 mm) narrow gauge to 2 ft 6 in (762 mm) narrow gauge. For this railway Calthrop had built two 0-6-0+0-6-0 Garratt locomotives, to which he had attached plates reading "E.R.Calthrop's System of Narrow Gauge Mountain Railways". Calthrop was an early adopter of the Garratt type, this being the ninth order for Garratts taken by Beyer-Peacock, and the smallest Garratt design ever built by them.

== Patents for parachutes ==
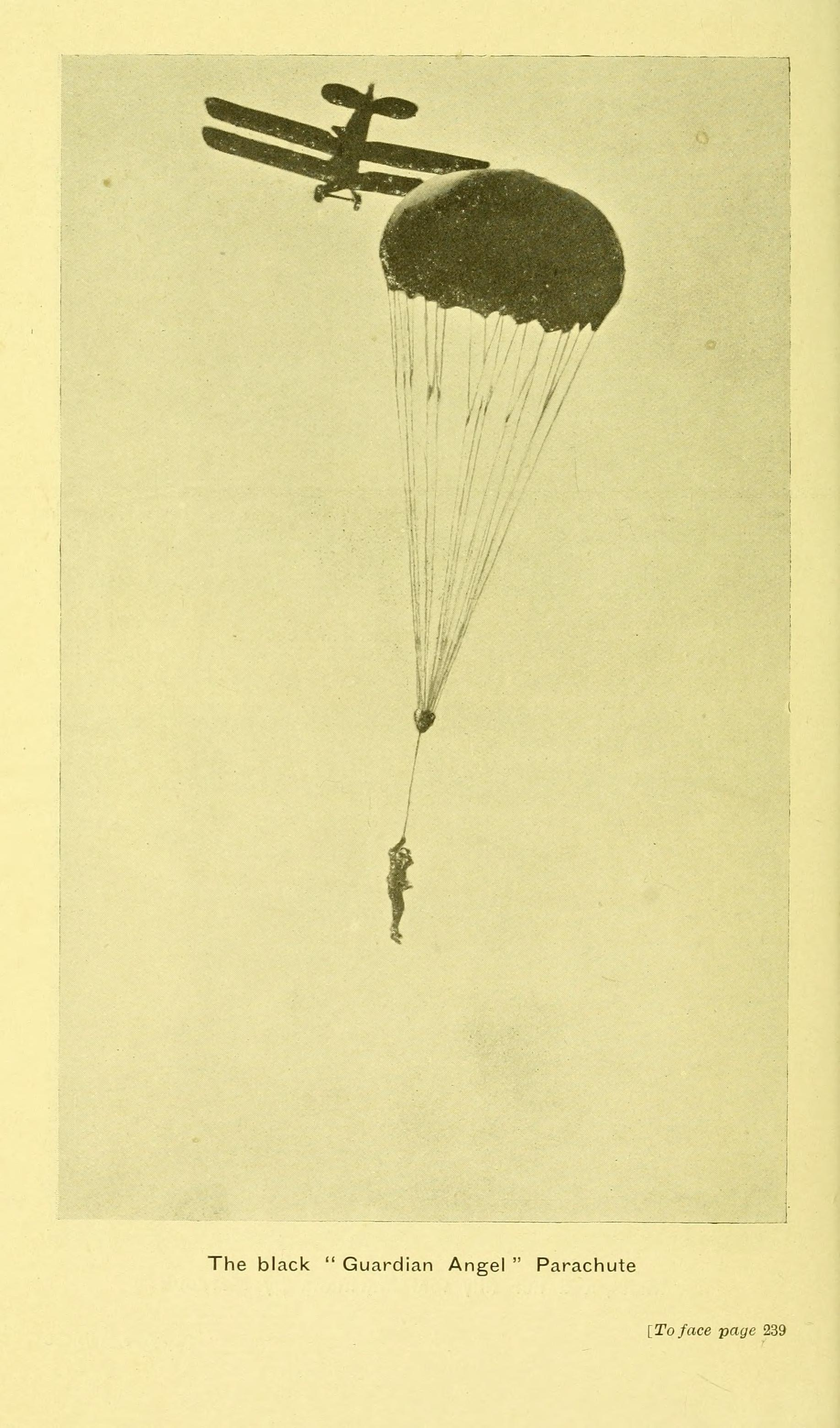
Calthrops black "Guardian Angel" parachute

Calthrop was a close personal friend of Charles Rolls, of Rolls-Royce fame. Rolls was a pioneer aviator, being the first man to fly across the English Channel in both directions. On 12 July 1910 Calthrop accompanied him to the Bournemouth International Aviation Meeting, and was present when Rolls died after he lost control of his biplane and crashed. That and a similar, non-fatal, accident involving his son Tev, led Calthrop to believe that a parachute could be used to save pilots in similar circumstances.

In 1913 he patented his first parachute. As World War I progressed he continued to develop his parachute. In 1915 he offered it to the Royal Flying Corps, and successful tests were completed at the time. An unofficial report offered the opinion that parachutes "might impair the fighting spirit of pilots" and the offer was rejected. Calthrop was encouraged to remain quiet about his invention, but faced with increasing losses of pilots he publicised the parachute in 1917. Despite a campaign by some pilots, the Royal Flying Corps declined to introduce parachutes during World War I, although air forces of most other nations did so.

Calthrop's "Guardian Angel" parachute received much praise and was used during the war to drop agents behind enemy lines. In October 1918 an article on use of parachutes stated that the "Guardian Angel" was one of the best known and that "balloonists can take their perilous leap, when attacked by a Hun scout, with real confidence in a safe landing". By 1918 it was known that the Germans were fully aware of Calthrop's work, and supplied their pilots with a similar design. However, when the Royal Air Force finally adopted parachutes after the war, they chose an American design.

In 1916 Calthrop also patented an ejector seat for aircraft using compressed air.

== Private life ==
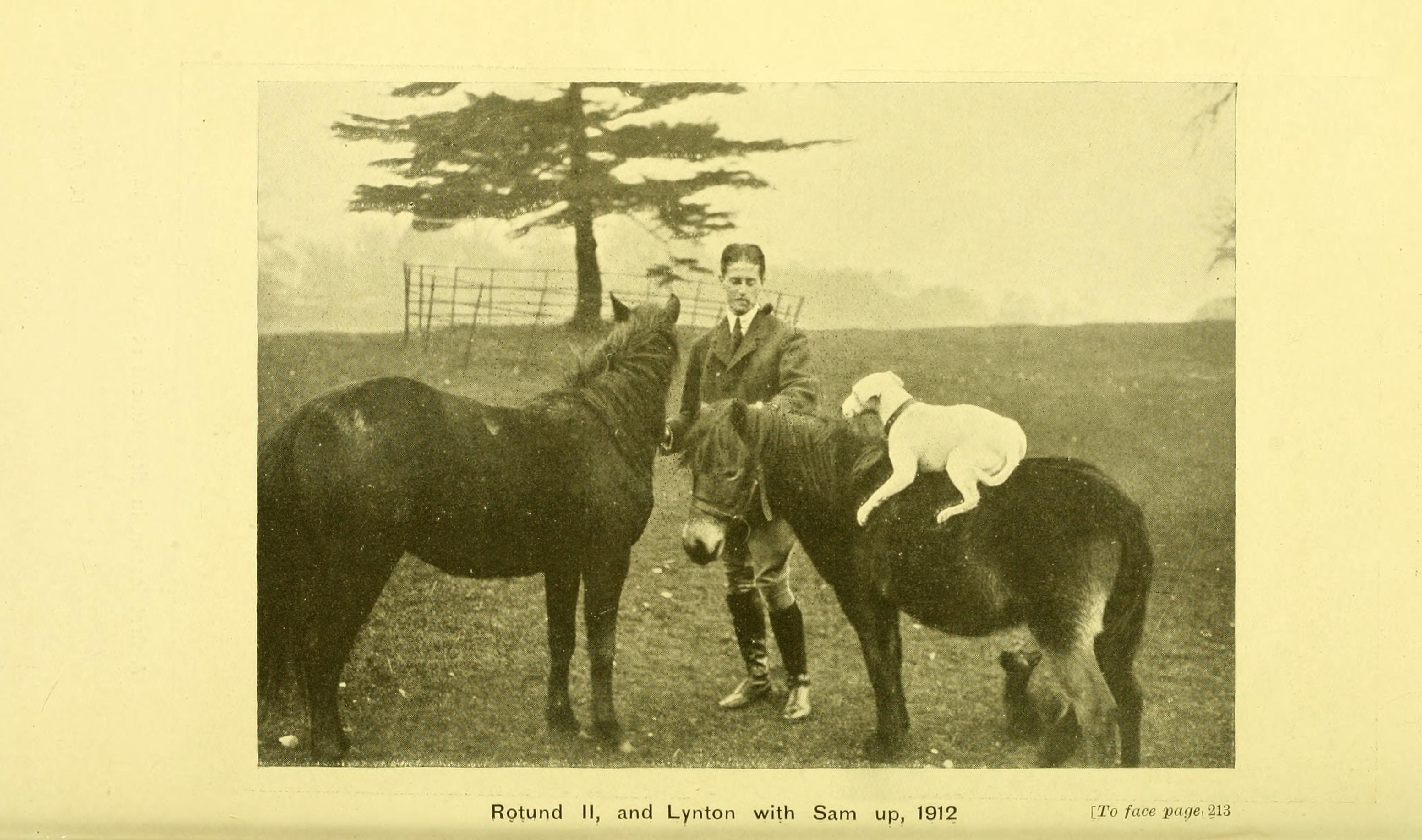
Image as depicted in The Horse, as Comrade and Friend, published in 1920

During his time in India, Calthrop made occasional trips back to Britain. On one such trip he married Isabel Mary Earle, the daughter of the Reverend Walter Earle, a friend of his parents. The wedding took place on 19 November 1890 at the Bilton Parish Church, Rugby. They had four children, Everard Earle (Tev, b. 1892), Keith de Suffield (b. 1894), Isabelle Iris (b. 1895), and Betty Marion (b. 1899). Tev joined the army and became a Colonel in the Royal Engineers, while Keith, after a stint in the Royal Engineers went on to become Assistant General Manager and Mechanical Engineer of the Barsi Light Railway, a post he held until 1932.

Calthrop had a great interest in breeding Arabian horses. Following the long-term rental of a villa in Goldings Road, Loughton, Essex, he purchased a permanent home, Goldings, at Clays Lane in Loughton, with stables and 40 acres (160,000 m^{2}) of grounds. It was here that he bred his horses and developed his theories of horse training. Calthrop rejected the cruel methods of breaking horses common in that era, and practiced gentle methods. Such was his concern for his horses that he had them humanely destroyed rather than have them commandeered by the British army at the start of the First World War. After the war he was able to return to his horses, and wrote an authoritative book, The Horse, as Comrade and Friend, published in 1920. Calthrop was a prominent member of the Arab Horse Society, and received commendations for his stallion, Fitz, at its first show in 1919.

Developing and promoting his parachute had left Calthrop drained, both financially and physically. Failing health forced him to resign his position as consulting engineer for the Barsi Railway in 1925, although he remained a director. Calthrop died at his Paddington, London, home on 30 March 1927, in the company of his son, Tev. He was seventy years old.

Calthrop is commemorated by a blue plaque on Goldings, unveiled in June 2008.

== Other narrow-gauge pioneers ==
- Paul Decauville
- Robert Fairlie
- Abraham Fitzgibbon
- Thomas Hall
- Carl Abraham Pihl
