= List of town tramway systems in India =

Trams in India were established in the late 19th century. Horse-drawn trams were introduced in Kolkata in 1873; in Mumbai and Chennai, trams began operations in 1874; in Nashik in 1889; electric trams began in Chennai in 1895, and trams were also introduced in Kanpur and Delhi. They were discontinued in all Indian cities between 1933 and 1964, except for trams in Kolkata.

== Kolkata (Calcutta) ==
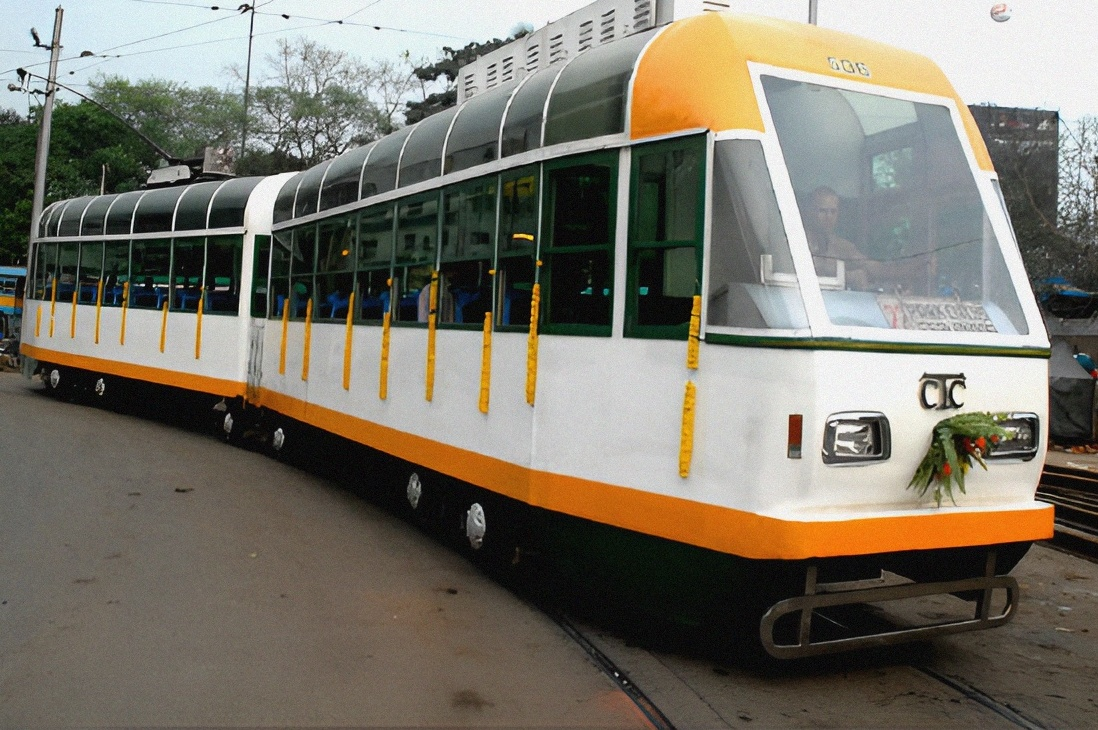
Tram in Kolkata

Trams in Kolkata (formerly Calcutta), West Bengal are operated by the West Bengal Transport Corporation (WBTC). It is the only operating tram network in India and the oldest operating electric tram in Asia, running since 1902. There are 257 trams in total, of which 125 used to run daily on the Kolkata streets, but only 25 trams run daily nowadays. The single-deck articulated cars can carry 200 passengers (60 seated).

The first horse-drawn trams in India ran a 2.4-mile (3.9 km) distance between Sealdah and Armenian Ghat Street on 24 February 1873. The service was discontinued on 20 November of that year. The Calcutta Tramway Company was formed and registered in London on 22 December 1880. Metre-gauge horse-drawn tram tracks were laid from Sealdah to Armenian Ghat via Bowbazar Street, Dalhousie Square and Strand Road. The route was inaugurated by Viceroy Ripon on 1 November 1880. In 1882, steam locomotives were deployed experimentally to haul tram cars. By the end of the 19th century, the company owned 166 tram cars, 1,000 horses, seven steam locomotives and 19 miles of tram tracks. In 1900, electrification of the tramway and reconstruction of its tracks to 4 ft 8 1/2 in (1,435 mm) (standard gauge) began. In 1902, the first electric tramcar in Calcutta ran from Esplanade to Kidderpore on 27 March and on 14 June from Esplanade to Kalighat.

== Mumbai (Bombay) ==
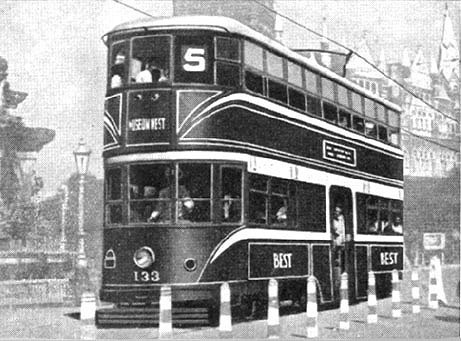
1920s double-decker tram in Mumbai

A mass public-transport system for Mumbai (then Bombay) was proposed in 1865 by an American company, which applied for a licence to operate a horse-drawn tram system. Although a licence was granted, the project was never realised due to the city's economic depression.

The Bombay Tramway Company was set up in 1873. After a contract was signed between the Bombay Tramway Company, the municipality and the Stearns and Kitteredge company, the Bombay Presidency enacted the Bombay Tramways Act, 1874 licensing the company to run a horsecar tram service in the city. On 9 May 1874, the first horse-drawn carriage made its début in the city, plying the Colaba–Pydhone via Crawford Market, and Bori Bunder to Pydhonie via Kalbadevi routes. The initial fare was three annas (12 paise pre-decimalisation), and no tickets were issued. As the service became increasingly popular, the fare was reduced to two annas (8 pre-decimalisation paise). Later that year, tickets were issued to curb increasing ticket-less travel. Stearns and Kitteredge reportedly had a stable of 1,360 horses over the lifetime of the service.

In 1899, the Bombay Tramway Company applied to the municipality to operate electric trams. In 1904, the British Electric Traction Company applied for a license to supply electricity to the city with the Brush Electrical Engineering Company its agent. It received the Bombay electric license on 31 July 1905, signed by Bombay Tramways Company, the Bombay Municipality and the Brush Electrical Company. In 1905, the Bombay Electric Supply and Tramway Company (BEST) was formed. BEST received a monopoly on electric supply and an electric tram service in the city, and bought the Bombay Tramway Company's assets for ₹9,850,000. Two years later, the first electric tram debuted in the city. Later that year, a 4,300 kilowatts (5,800 hp) steam power generator was commissioned at Wari Bunder. In 1916, a power purchase from Tata Power (a private company) began, and by 1925, all power generation was outsourced from Tata. To ease rush-hour traffic, double-decker trams were introduced in September, 1920. The trams met travellers' needs until the betterment of the city's train network, and the service closed on 31 March 1964.

== Chennai (Madras) ==
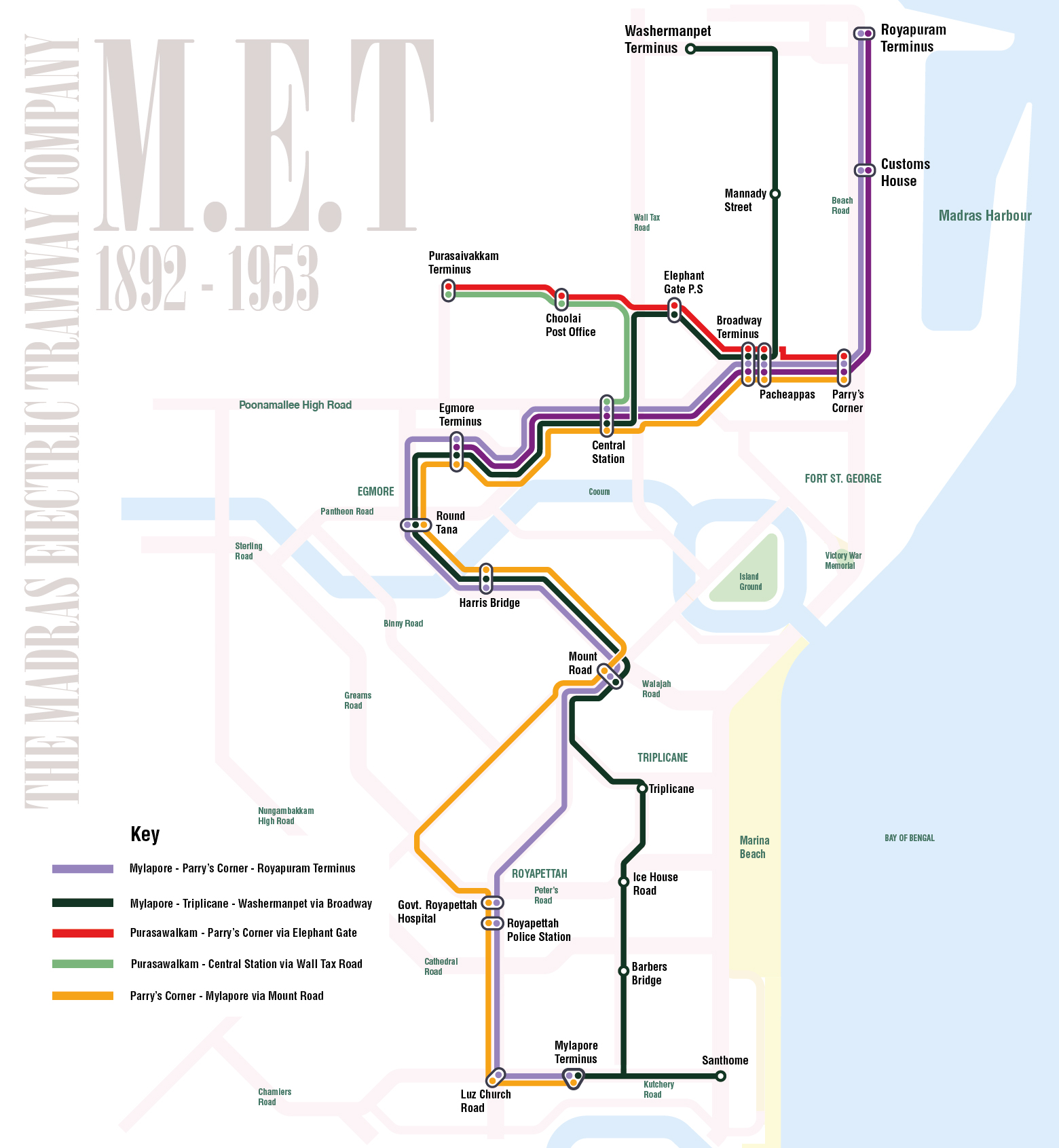
The Tram network in Madras operated by The Madras Electric Tramway Company from 1892 to 1953.

Chennai (then Madras) was the third city in India to get a tramway for passenger carriage. The first horse-drawn tram service in Madras began operations in June, 1874, shortly after the opening of the tramway in Bombay. The tramway used metre gauge tracks and operated on several routes, the chief of them being a route between Royapuram and Triplicane. The tramway was in service for a few years, but like the early horse-drawn trams in Calcutta, it had to be discontinued due to poor financial returns.

Tramways saw a revival in the city with the opening of the Madras Electric Tramways in 1895, connecting the docks and the inland areas, carrying goods and passengers. When the system began on 7 May 1895, it was India's oldest electric tram system and it is the first electric tram system in India. The original conduit system was replaced by a conventional overhead wire system after a series of destructive monsoons. The trams could carry heavy loads and were popular, with thousands of riders daily. The route included Mount Road, Parry's Corner, Poonamallee Road and the Ripon Building. At its height in 1921, 97 cars ran on 24 kilometres (15 mi) of track. The tram company went bankrupt about 1950, and the system closed on 12 April 1953.

== Nashik ==
Nashik was the fourth city in India after Chennai, Kolkata and Mumbai to get trams in 1889. Trams in Nashik (then Nasik) were built in 1889 as 2 ft 6 in (762 mm) narrow gauge. The consulting engineer was Everard Calthrop, later known with the Barsi Light Railway. Originally, the tram used two carriages pulled by four horses. It ran from the present Old Municipal Corporation building on Main Road to the Nasik Road railway station, a distance of 8 to 10 km. The stretch between Nashik and Nashik Road was jungle-covered, and the only mode of transport from the station to the city was horse-drawn carriage or one of two taxis. The tram originated from the Old Municipal Corporation building located on Main Road, and terminated at the Nashik Road railway station (8–10 km). It passed through the areas of Ganjamal (the now defunct bus stop was earlier a tram stop) and behind Fame Multiplex. Brady's; a private company funded the project and later introduced India's first petrol engine driven tram under the aegis of Nasik Tramway Co. The tramway closed down in around 1933 owing to the successive years of famine and plague, it had run into heavy losses.

== Kanpur ==
In June 1907, trams were introduced in Kanpur (then Cawnpore). There were 4 miles (6.4 km) of track and 20 single-deck open trams. The single-track line connected the railway station with Sirsaya Ghat on the banks of the Ganges. Photographs of Cawnpore trams are rare. The introductory stock was electric-traction single-coach; single-coach trams were also used in Delhi, Mumbai and Chennai. The service was discontinued on 16 May 1933.

== Kochi ==
The Cochin State Forest Tramway was a 1,000 mm (3 ft 3 3/8 in) metre gauge forest tramway running from the Parambikulam Wildlife Sanctuary in Palakkad district to Chalakudy in Thrissur district. Operating from 1907 to 1963, it served then Cochin state (now part of Kerala) and brought teak and rosewood from forests for global shipment.

== Delhi ==
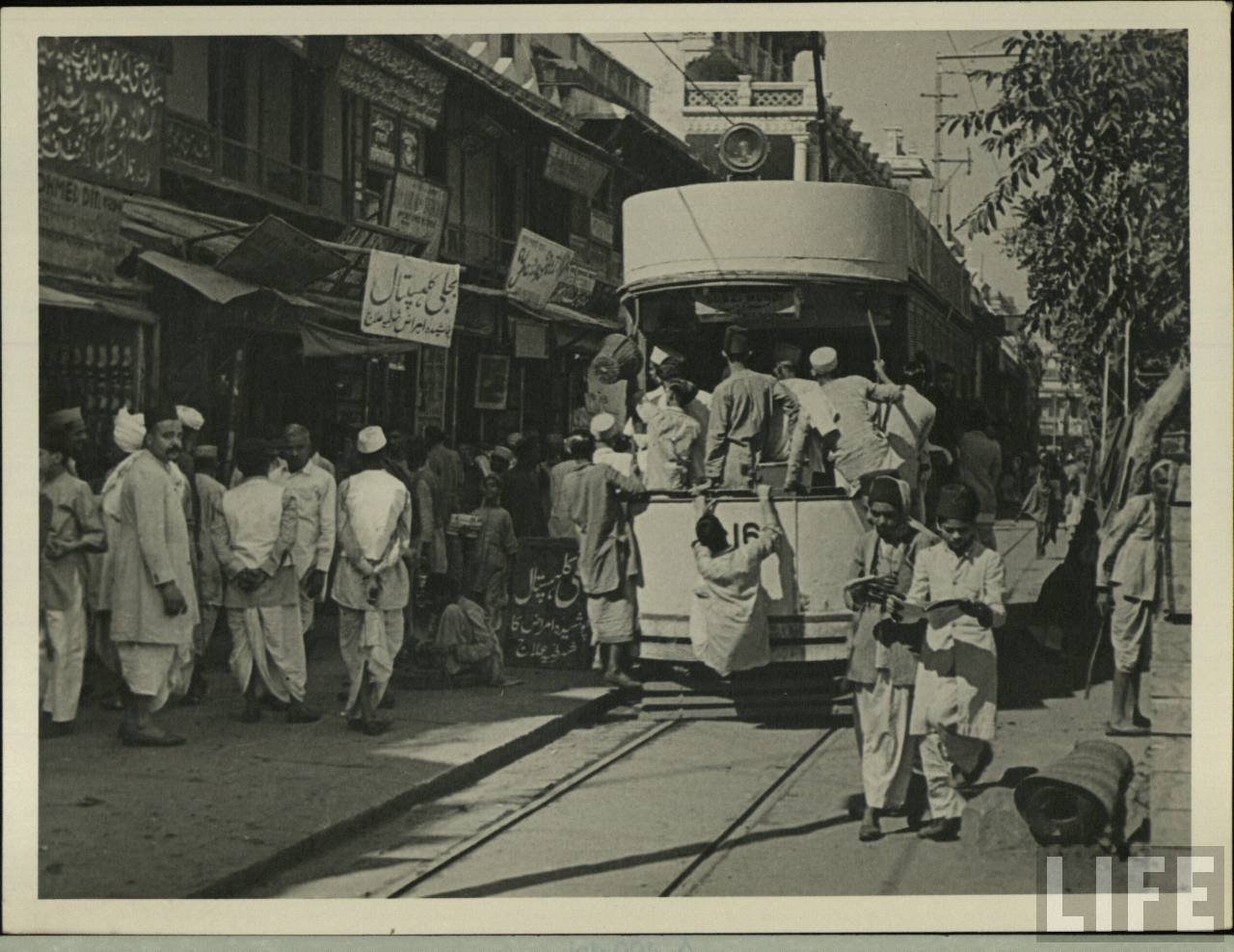
A tram in Delhi

Trams in Delhi began operation on 6 March 1908. At its zenith in 1921, there were 24 open cars on 15 kilometres (9.3 mi) of track. Jama Masjid, Chandni Chowk, Chawri Bazaar, Katra Badiyan, Lal Kuan, Delhi and Fatehpuri were linked with Sabzi Mandi, Sadar Bazar, Paharganj, Ajmeri Gate, Bara Hindu Rao and Tis Hazari. The system closed in 1963 due to urban congestion.

== Patna ==
Patna had horse-drawn trams as urban transport. The tram in Patna ran in the populated area of Ashok Rajpath, from Patna City to Bankipore, with its western terminus at Sabzibagh (opposite the Pirbahore police station). It was discontinued in 1903, due to low ridership, and plans to extend the route westward never materialised.

== Bhavnagar ==
Bhavnagar had a 2 ft 6 in (762 mm) narrow-gauge tram built by Bhavnagar State. The first section was built in 1926 from Bhavnagar south to Talaja, and was extended to Mahuva in 1938. The total length of the tramway was 67.5 miles (108.6 km). The tramway used small 4-8-0 locomotives later classified as T class. In 1947, the tramway was taken over by the Saurashtra Railway, and later by the Western Railway. It was closed during the 1960s.

== See also ==
- Urban rail transit in India
- Rail transport in India
- List of tram and light rail transit systems
