= Carl Abraham Pihl =

Norwegian civil engineer (1825–1897)

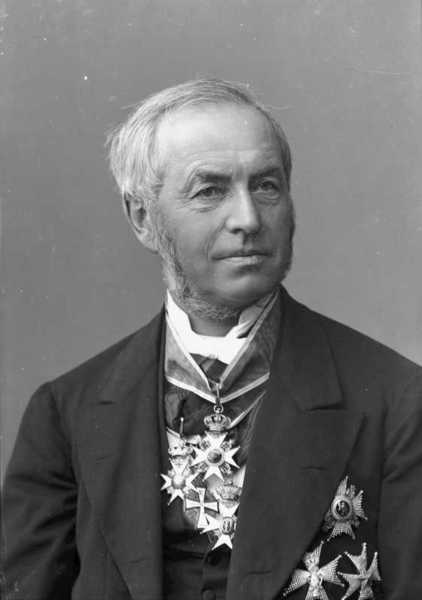
- Born: 16 January 1825; Stavanger, Norway
- Died: 14 September 1897 (aged 72); Kristiania, Norway
- Education: Chalmers University of Technology
- Occupation: Engineer
- Employer: Norwegian State Railways
- Known for: Railway pioneer
- Spouse: Catherine Ridley
- Children: 11
- Parent(s): Thomas Bugge Pihl; Fredrikke Wivicke Margrethe Løvold

Carl Abraham Pihl (16 January 1825 – 14 September 1897) was a Norwegian civil engineer and director of the Norwegian State Railways (NSB) from 1865 until his death. Pihl was one of the main architects of the use of narrow-gauge railways in Norway.

== Biography ==
The son of Thomas Bugge Pihl and Fredrikke Wivicke Margrethe Løvold, he started off as a seaman, but soon chose to attend Chalmers University of Technology in Gothenburg (1841–1844). He then went to London and worked as an office engineer; he worked on many cases related to railways, including many of those by Robert Stephenson. After two years he started field work, with a management position at a site in Suffolk until 1850. While working in England he also learned the art of photography. His collections remain a unique collection of Norwegian railway heritage, dating back to 1862.

Pihl returned to Norway in 1850, and started working for the road office at the Norwegian Ministry of the Interior, but by 1851 he was hired as an engineer on Norway's first railway, the Hoved Line, where he worked on the section from Christiania to Lillestrøm. After completion of the line in 1854 he moved back to England for a year, but later returned to work on the Telemark Canal, and subsequently as county engineer in Akershus. In 1855, Pihl proposed building pumping stations and gasworks in Skien. Since he was the most prominent railway engineer in Norway at the time, he was hired in 1856 to work on the projects for several of the early railways in Norway, the first being the Kongsvinger Line, the Hamar–Grundset Line and the Trondhjem–Støren Line. In 1858 the office of Statens Jernbaneanlægs hovedkontor was created to manage the state railways, and Pihl was hired as its director.

After the reorganization of the railways in 1865, Pihl was appointed the first director-general of the state railways. When this was transformed to the Norwegian State Railways in 1883, Pihl was appointed director of the fixed-stock division—a position he held until his death. During his last fourteen years he was considerably less influential than he previously had been, but he remained the highest-paid civil servant in Norway at the time.

In recognition of his technical assistance, the managements of the Toronto, Grey and Bruce Railway and the Toronto and Nipissing Railway offered to pay Pihl's passage to Toronto for the opening of their 3 ft 6 in (1,067 mm) gauge lines in the summer of 1871. Pihl insisted on paying his own way so that he would not be compromised by such a gift. He sailed from Christiana to England where he spent much time as a guest of the 3rd Duke of Sutherland, and Sir Henry Whatley Tyler, visiting John Ramsbottom at the London and North Western Railway company's locomotive works at Crewe. He then sailed to New York where he met the Swedish railway-engineer John Ericsson. He travelled by steamer and train to Niagara Falls and then on to Toronto. The directors of the Canadian narrow-gauge system honoured him with several banquets and with the gift of a silver vase. He was offered a job in Toronto with the Grand Trunk Railway, but refused despite being offered twice the wages he was earning in Norway; he even insisted that the offer remain confidential so that it was not seen as a means of raising his wages from the Norwegian authorities.

In 1870, he was elected a member of the Royal Swedish Academy of Sciences, and, on 4 May 1880, a member of the United Kingdom's Institution of Civil Engineers.

He married Catherine Ridley, at Ipswich, (Note: The marriage was indexed by the General Register Office for England and Wales as having been recorded at Ipswich Registration district, in Volume 4a, Page 715, for the first quarter (January to March) of 1853.) 1853; they had 11 children from 1854 to 1875.

== Norwegian gauge controversy ==
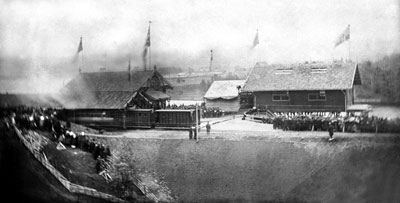
Photograph taken by Pihl of the opening of Randsfjordbanen in 1868

When building the Norwegian Trunk Railway (1850-1854), Robert Stephenson built the line in accordance with British standards of standard gauge and overdimensioned bridges and curves. This line was very expensive; Pihl argued that narrow-gauged railways would be less expensive to construct. After studying foreign designs, C. W. Bergh initially concluded that 3 ft 4 in (1,016 mm) would be suitable, but Pihl argued for extra width and opted for 3 ft 6 in (1,067 mm). Through his influential position in the department he convinced the politicians that all new railways should be built on the narrow gauge—except those that would connect with the Swedish system, where standard gauge had become the norm. During the railway construction boom of the 1870s and 1880s all but the Kongsvinger Line, the Meråker Line and the Østfold Line were built with narrow gauge, leaving Norway with two incompatible systems.

At the time it was not considered probable that the railway system would become connected, but by the turn of the century large-scale projects like the Bergen Line and the Sørland Line were connecting all the isolated railways; transshipment costs were becoming a drain on resources for the railways and all narrow-gauge lines were either closed or converted between 1909 and 1949, at a cost many times larger than the initial savings of building them narrow. During the 1880s the issue of gauge reappeared, with the majority recommending the broader gauge; it was soon shown that standard-gauge railways built to the same specifications as the narrow gauge could be constructed at the same cost. Pihl commented in his late years that while he realized that the narrow gauge had become outdated, at the time it had been a choice between building narrow and cheap, or not building at all. The final death of the narrow gauge came the year after Pihl died, when parliament decided to build the Bergen Line as standard gauge.

== Narrow-gauge railways ==
=== 3 ft 6 in (1,067 mm) gauge track ===
The narrow-gauge system developed by Pihl is the only notable rail transport export from Norway; through his international travels he convinced other rural countries to build cheaper narrow-gauge systems, and the 3 ft 6 in (1,067 mm) system soon became one of the major systems in the world; many British colonies and dominions such as South Africa, Australia (Queensland), Canada (Newfoundland) and New Zealand opted for the gauge and also Asian countries such as Indonesia, Japan, Philippines and Taiwan.

The majority of historical sources use the term "Cape gauge" to describe 3 ft 6 in (1,067 mm) gauge, referring to its use by the Cape Government Railways,. Some modern sources have suggested the use of the term "CAP gauge", an acronym for Carl Abraham Pihl.

=== Couplings and loading gauge ===
The trains promoted by Pihl had a centre buffer-coupling more suited to sharp curves than the original twin buffer and chain model developed by Stephenson. No attempt appears to have been made to introduce these couplings and sharper curves to standard-gauge lines, although trams which have extremely sharp curves usually have some kind of centre coupling.

Similarly, the cost of a standard-gauge line would be reduced by having a smaller loading gauge with shorter, lower and narrower vehicles and tunnels of smaller cross-section.

== Other narrow-gauge pioneers ==
- (in chronological order of "influence")
- Henry Archer – Festiniog Railway opened 1836 (horse drawn & gravity); 1863 (steam locomotives)
  - Gloucester railway station of 1844 – first break of gauge
  - Royal Commission on Railway Gauges of 1845 fails to consider narrow gauges
- Abraham Fitzgibbon – Queensland Railways opened 1865
- Robert Fairlie – articulated locomotive (patented in 1864)
- Thomas Hall – Namaqualand Railway in the Cape Colony – 1875
- Paul Decauville – manufacture of portable narrow-gauge Decauville equipment started 1875
- Everard Calthrop – c1886

== Namesake ==
The barque Carl Pihl, a 726-ton ship, sailed between Norway, Australian, and Californian waters. It operated in Australian waters between 1884 and 1889 and carried cargo such as timber and wool.

Newspaper references:

- 1889 (6)
- 1888 (5)
- 1886 (19)
- 1885 (2)
- 1884 (16)
