= Robert Francis Fairlie =

British engineer and locomotive designer (1831–1885)

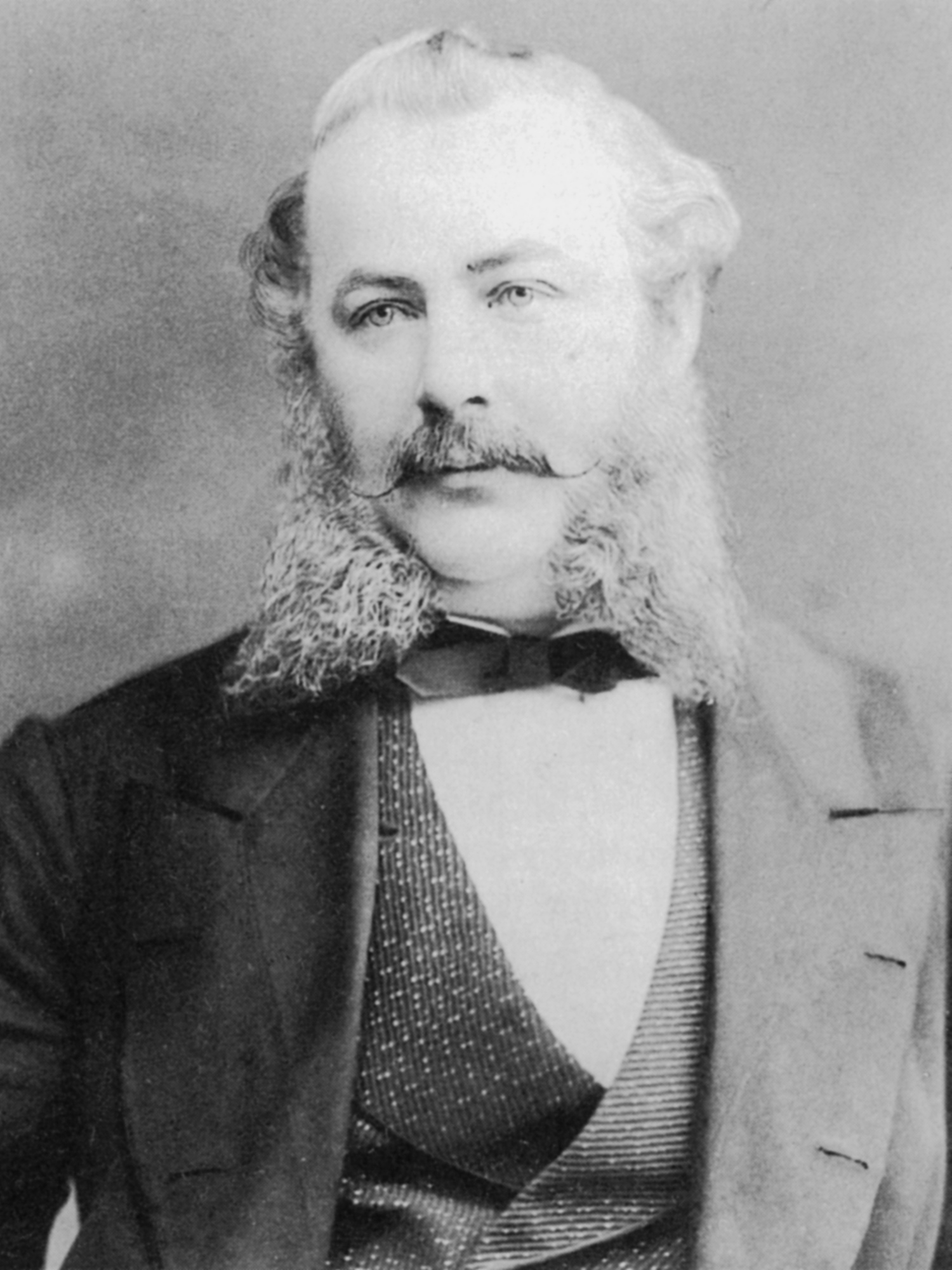
- Fairlie in the 1870s
- Born: 1830 – 1831; Glasgow, Scotland
- Died: July 31, 1885; London, England
- Occupation: Railway Engineer
- Known for: Fairlie double-bogie articulated locomotive

Robert Francis Fairlie (either March 1831 or 5 April 1830 – 31 July 1885) was a Scottish-born railway engineer. He is chiefly known for the invention of the Fairlie double-bogie articulated locomotive.

== Early life ==
Fairlie was born in Glasgow, the son of T. Archibald Fairlie (an engineer) and Margaret Fairlie. He trained at Crewe and Swindon railway works, then joined first the Londonderry and Coleraine Railway as Locomotive Superintendent in 1852, and four years later the Bombay, Baroda & Central India Railway before returning to London in 1859 to establish himself as a railway engineering consultant.

== Festiniog Railway ==
Fairlie patented the Fairlie double-bogie articulated locomotive in 1864. It was particularly associated with tightly curved railways and especially narrow gauge mountain lines. The first such, the Pioneer, was built in 1865 for the Neath and Brecon Railway, but it was with the Little Wonder built-in 1869 for the Festiniog Railway that Fairlie made his name as the inventor of something special.

On the Festiniog Railway, the new locomotive was tested against the railway's existing George England and Co. four-coupled tank locomotives. A series of tests, for which detailed performance records survive, were held between 18 September 1869 and 8 July 1870.

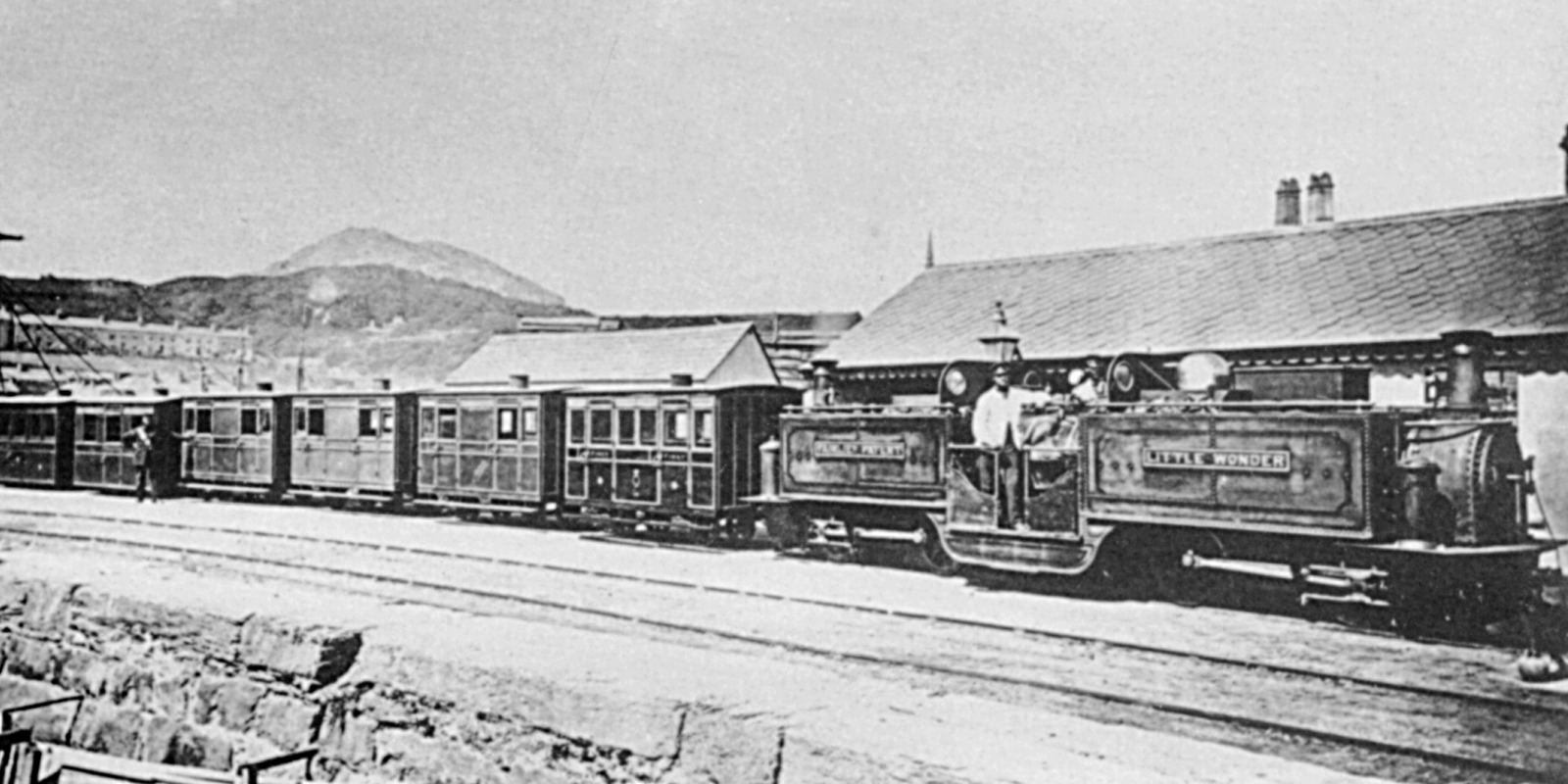
Little Wonder with train of four-wheeled passenger carriages at Portmadoc harbour station on the Festiniog Railway c1870.

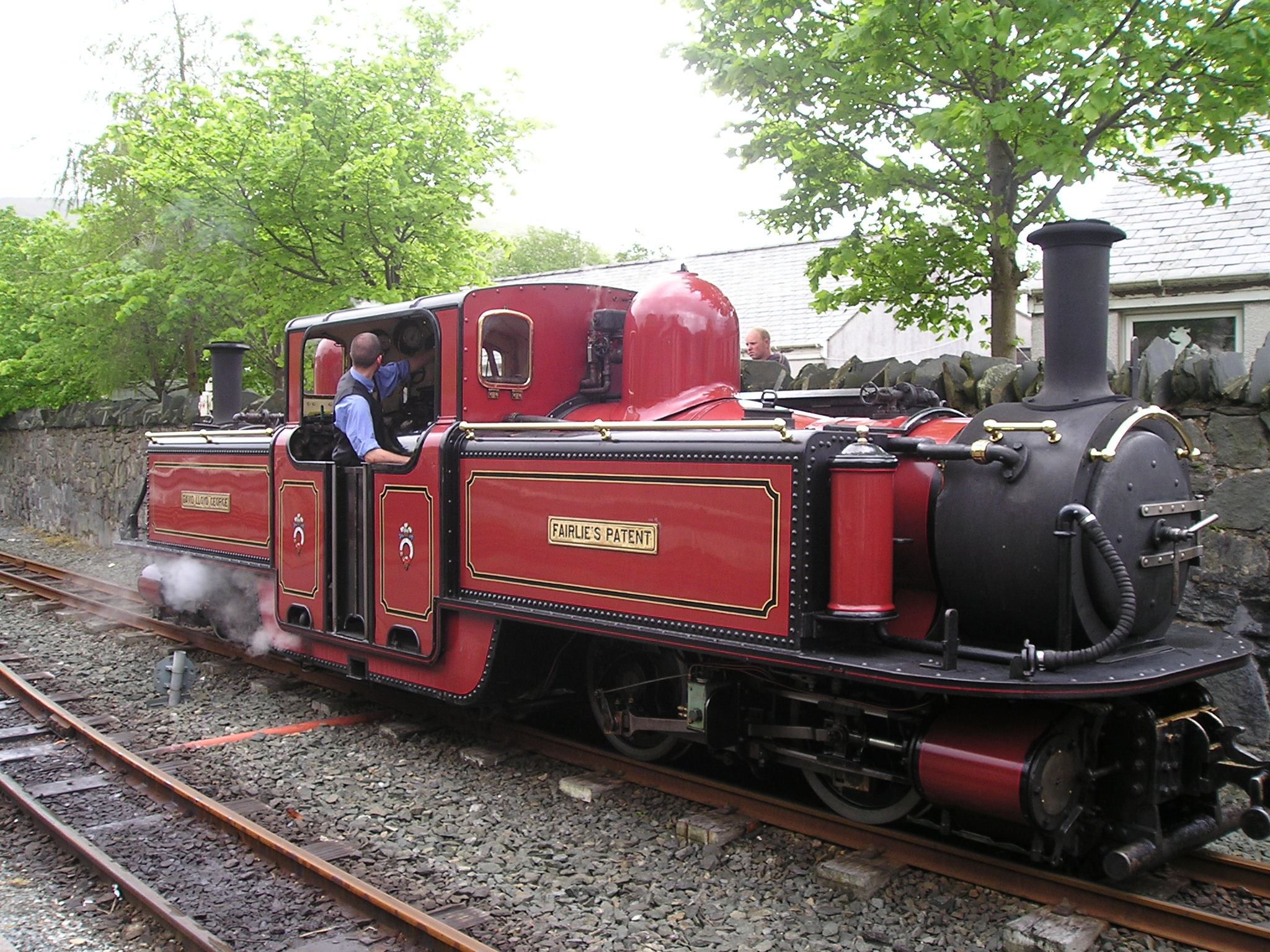
David Lloyd George built new in 1991, one of several double Fairlie locomotives operated by the Ffestiniog Railway today.

On 11 February 1870, a formal demonstration was held, for invited guests from around the world, including: The Duke of Sutherland; Mr W. T. Mulvany, from Prussia; M. Tolme, engineer; M. Phillippe Kremer from Paris, engaged on the Moscow and Nizhny Novgorod Railway; Mr Christer P. Sandberg, Swedish Consulate, London; Count Czheni, Russia; Count Alexander Berg, son of the generalissimo of the Russian army, and Viceroy of Poland; Count Bobrinski, Russia; Count Tamoyski, Hungary; Basiley Saloff, Professor of the Imperial Institute of Engineers, St. Petersburg; Charles de Schouberszki, director of the Kursk and Kharkov Railway in Russia; Count Ivan Tlabroburr, Moscow; Count von Desen, St. Petersburg; L. de Kislankske, of the Imperial Institute, St. Petersburg; Mr Preston, solicitor to the London and North Western Railway Company; Capt. Tyler, Government Inspecting Officer for Railways; Mr Preston, engaged on the railway from Tiflis to the Caucasus, in Turkey and Russia; Gen. Sir William Baker, K.C.B.; Mr Power, M.P ., connected with the Mexico and Vera Cruz Railways; Mr Pille [i.e. Carl Abraham Pihl], Sweden; Mr Ayrton, Mr Elias, general manager, Cambrian Railways; Mr Poole, local traffic manager ditto; Mr Charles E. Spooner, engineer, Festiniog Railway Company; Mr Crawley, C.E., London; Mr Danas, Indian Railways; Mr C. Thornton, ditto; Mr Livingston Thompson, Chairman and managing director, Festiniog Railway Company; Mr Dallas, The Times newspaper, and Mr Thomas Cargill, engineer & reporter of the Engineering Gazette Further parties of engineers and managers came to Porthmadog on four later occasions in 1870 to observe the locomotive at work.

Fairlie received many orders and commissions following the trials. In 1873-1874 he traveled to Venezuela, but this trip resulted in a serious illness. By 1876 forty-three railways operated Fairlie's patent locomotives, not always successfully.

== Elopement and marriage ==
However, Robert Fairlie's professional career and social standing had been seriously threatened eight years earlier by a remarkable case (reported in The Times of 8 April 1862) brought against him in the Central Criminal Court by his longtime business associate, George England, who alleged perjury on the part of Robert Francis Fairlie who had eloped with England's daughter Eliza Anne England and, to procure a marriage licence, had sworn a false affidavit that her father, Mr George England, had consented to the union, which was not true. After this marriage they had run away to Spain.

This accusation would, if proved, have resulted in a prison sentence. Under cross-examination by Sergeant Ballantyne (who appeared for Fairlie), George England was forced to admit that he had run away with his present wife, who was the mother of the young lady in question, and that he had a wife living at that time. He had lived with this lady several years but could not marry her until his wife died. By a quirk of English law, at that time, a child born out of wedlock was considered nobody's child. In law she was nothing to do with George England and could marry whom she pleased. There was no case to answer and therefore a verdict of not guilty was returned.

But none of this stopped George England building Robert Fairlie's remarkable double-engine for the Ffestiniog Railway seven years later. Fairlie's Little Wonder was delivered to the FR in the summer of 1869 and George England retired. In September 1869 Robert Fairlie joined with George England's son and J.S. Fraser to take over the Hatcham Works and to form the Fairlie Engine & Steam Carriage Co. but George England junior died within a few months. Locomotive production ceased at the end of 1870 but the Fairlie Engine & Rolling Stock Co. continued as an office for design and for the licensing of Fairlie locomotive manufacture.

George England died in 1878, and by 1881 Fairlie and his wife Eliza were living at 13 Church Buildings, Clapham with their children, Robert, John, Lily and Jessie (their other son, Frank, was at Charterhouse School as a boarder at the time of the 1881 Census) and Robert's mother in law, Sarah England. Robert Francis Fairlie died in London on 31 July 1885 and is buried at West Norwood Cemetery.

== Other narrow gauge pioneers ==
- Abraham Fitzgibbon
- Carl Abraham Pihl
- Everard Calthrop
- Paul Decauville
- Thomas Hall

== Bibliography ==
- Locomotive Engines, What they are and What they Ought to be by R. F. Fairlie, London, John King & Co., 693, Queen Street, E.C. 1864
- Railways or No Railways – The Battle of the Gauges Renewed by R. F. Fairlie, London, Effingham Wilson, Royal Exchange. 1872 (Online version – Archive.org)
