= Richie Thomas =

Welsh cricketer

Personal information
- Full name: Richard James Thomas
- Born: 18 June 1942 (age 84); Griffithstown, Monmouthshire, Wales
- Batting: Right-handed
- Bowling: Right-arm medium

Domestic team information
- Years: Team
- 1969–1974: Glamorgan

Career statistics
Competition	First-class	List A
Matches	1	1
Runs scored	8	1
Batting average	–	–
100s/50s	0/0	0/0
Top score	8*	1*
Balls bowled	62	42
Wickets	1	1
Bowling average	40.00	13.00
5 wickets in innings	0	0
10 wickets in match	0	0
Best bowling	1/40	1/13
Catches/stumpings	0/–	0/–
- Source: Cricinfo, 4 July 2010

Richard 'Richie' James Thomas (born 18 June 1942) is a former Welsh cricketer. Thomas was a right-handed batsman who bowled right-arm medium pace. He was born at Griffithstown, Monmouthshire.

Thomas made his debut for Glamorgan in a List-A match in the 1969 John Player League against Derbyshire. This was Thomas' only List-A appearance for the county. Five years later, he made his first-class debut for Glamorgan in the County Championship against Lancashire, which was also his only first-class appearance for the county.
