= Ritchie Thomas =

Australian rules footballer

Personal information
- Full name: Richard John Harold Thomas
- Born: 13 July 1915; Mount Lawley, Western Australia
- Died: 30 July 1988 (aged 73); Perth, Western Australia
- Height: 178 cm (5 ft 10 in)
- Weight: 83 kg (183 lb)
- Position: Back pocket

Playing career^{1}
Years	Club	Games (Goals)
1933–48	East Perth	207 (2)
1941	Essendon	4 (0)

Representative team honours
Years	Team	Games (Goals)
1939–46	Western Australia	4 (0)
- ^{1} Playing statistics correct to the end of 1948.

Career highlights
- East Perth premiership player 1936; East Perth best and fairest 1939, 1940

Richard John Harold Thomas (13 July 1915 – 30 July 1988) was an Australian rules footballer who played with East Perth in the Western Australian National Football League and for Essendon in the Victorian Football League (VFL).

Thomas was the son of William 'Digger' Thomas, the 1923 Sandover Medalist who also played with East Perth.

He played his football across half back and was on a flank in East Perth's 1936 premiership side. The defender shared the "Best and Fairest" award at East Perth in 1939 and then won it outright in 1940.

Thomas enlisted in the Australian Army in July 1942, and served with the 13 Field Company during World War II. Having been sent to Victoria to attend a physical training course at an army school in Frankston, Thomas made four appearances for Essendon, all of which the club won, including a semi-final against Richmond. He missed out on participating any deeper in the finals series as he had to return home: Essendon went on to make the 1941 VFL Grand Final, but lost to Melbourne. Thomas was subsequently stationed in Darwin, and was a member of a West Australian team that defeated a combined South Australia–Victoria side in 1942. After eighteen months in Darwin, Thomas was posted to New Britain (in present-day Papua New Guinea). Having spent three months there, he was sent to a military school Sydney to complete physical training. While in Sydney, Thomas took up football with the Eastern Suburbs Australian Football Club (later the UNSW-Eastern Suburbs Bulldogs), playing with a number of other interstate footballers on military service.

He resumed playing with East Perth after the war and represented Western Australia in two interstate matches against South Australia in 1946. This brought his interstate tally to four, having played twice against Victoria before the war.
