= Richard Thomas (civil engineer) =

Richard Thomas (27 December 1779 – 21 February 1858) was an English civil engineer.

He produced a survey of the navigation of the River Severn, he also created a geological map of the mining district of Cornwall in 1819 which went through several editions.

In 1815, Thomas produced the first "Falmouth Guide" containing "a concise account of the history, trade, port and public establishments of Falmouth; directions to the public offices, lodging-houses, inns, taverns, etc."

Between 1850 and 1852, he wrote 35 letters to the West Briton newspaper, in which he discussed no fewer than 490 barrows, 180 various earthworks and archaeological remains in Cornwall.

Barrows destroyed since he had seen them included 7 barrows on St Breock Downs, the diameter of some being 55 feet, the others smaller.

Although he died in the Isles of Scilly, his funeral took place at Budock, Falmouth.
