= Barsi Light Railway =

Narrow-gauge railway

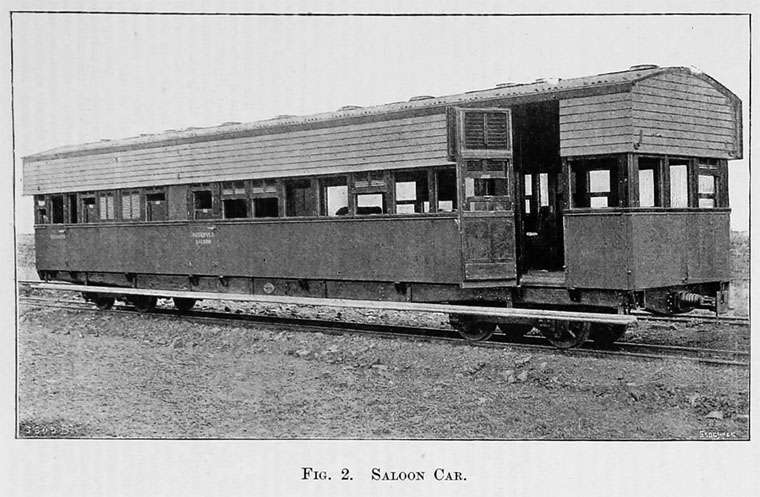
Saloon Car by Leeds Forge Co (1897)

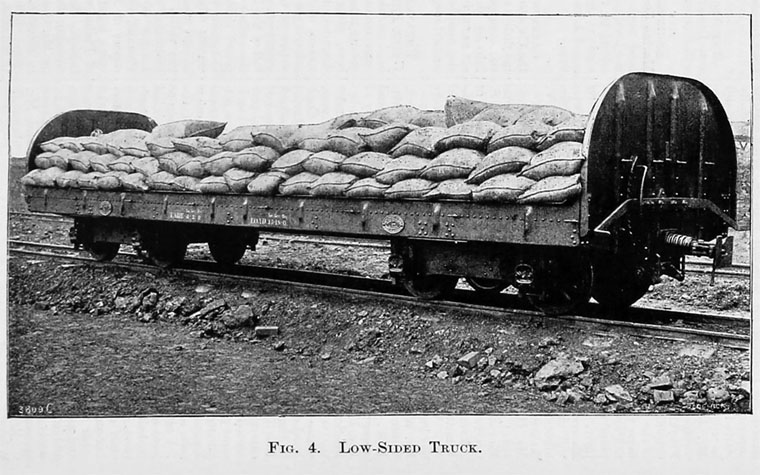
Low Sided Truck by Leeds Forge Co (1897)

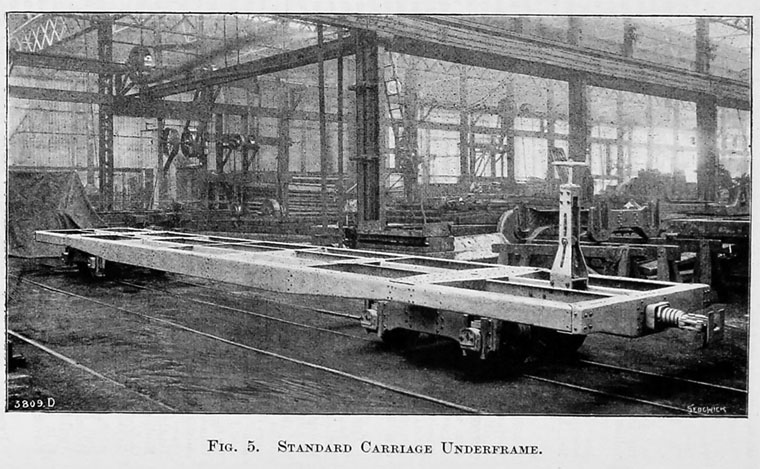
Standard Carriage Underframe by Leeds Forge Co (1897)

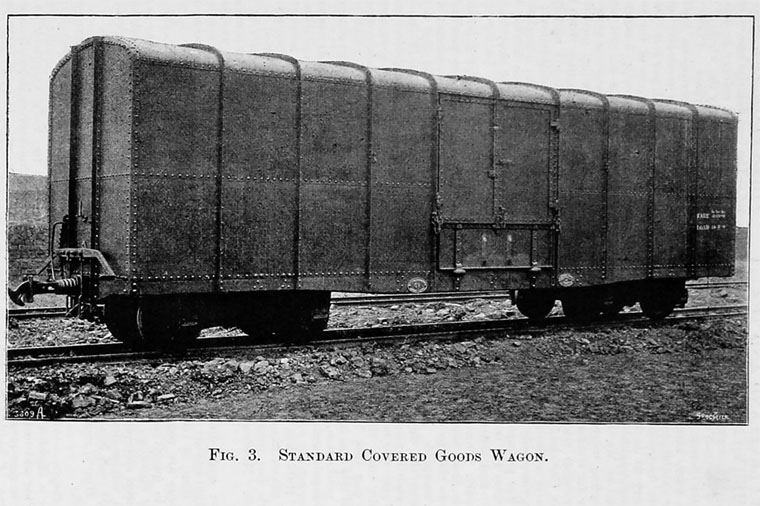
Standard Covered Goods Wagon by Leeds Forge Co (1897)

Barsi Light Railway (BLR) was a 202-mile (325 km) long, 2 ft 6 in (762 mm) narrow-gauge railway between Miraj and Latur in the state of Maharashtra in India. It was designed by British engineer Everard Calthrop, and regarded as having revolutionised narrow-gauge railway construction in India.

== Classification ==
It was labeled as a Class II railway according to Indian Railway Classification System of 1926.

== Background: The Barsi Tramway Project ==
The Barsee Tramway was a project, proposed in 1862, to construct a bullock driven Tramway 'to connect Barsee with the Barsee railway station’. In the event the Tramway was not installed but the groundwork had been completed with the construction of the earth works, cuttings and bridges and was completed in 1870 [3].

By the 1870’s Barsi had become the spelling of the town. Barsi Town was connected to Barsi Road Station on the GIPR, a distance of 22 mi (35 km), utilising the completed groundworks providing a 24 ft (7.3 m) wide roadway with 'hard shoulders' [4] and designed to be built with sufficient strength to carry locomotives and the gradients which did not exceed 1 in 100 [3]. The Seena (Sina) River bridge was a ten arch masonry constructed bridge.

== History ==
Calthrop worked as a locomotive inspector for the Great Indian Peninsula Railway (GIPR), and in 1886 requested leave to investigate proposals for independent branch lines. He identified two schemes of particular interest – a 5-mile (8 km) tramway connecting the Hindu religious centre of Nasik with the railway, and a 21-mile (34 km) branch line to the town of Barshi. The Great Indian Peninsula Railway approved both schemes, and Calthrop undertook a survey of both lines. In 1887 he registered the Indian Railways Feeder Lines Company in London to promote the construction of feeders to the railway, and began negotiations with the Indian government to build the Barsi Light Railway. The GIPR suggested that he either return to his duties as a locomotive inspector, or resign (with its support) to further promote branch lines. His health was failing, and in 1889 Calthrop resigned from the GIPR. Working as a consultant, he then supervised construction of the 2 ft 6 in (762 mm) gauge horse-powered Nasik Tramway using his previous survey.

In 1895 the negotiations that began in 1887 were finally successful and Calthrop formed a new company to build the Barsi Light Railway, employing himself as consulting engineer. Calthrop surmised that the axle load on the axles of all rolling stock (including locomotives) could be equal, allowing maximum loading of goods wagons. He settled on a load of 5 long tons (5.1 t; 5.6 short tons) per axle, which was light enough to allow railway lines to be built with 30 pounds per yard (14.9 kg/m) rail. Further, he argued that using a track gauge of 2 ft 6 in (762 mm) was the best compromise between economy of construction and carrying capacity. Five 0-8-4T locomotives (with even distribution of axle load) were constructed to Calthrop's specification by Kitson and Company. The goods rolling stock was constructed on common 25 by 7 ft (7.62 by 2.13 m) pressed-steel underframes, reducing tare weight and maximising wagon loads. Calthrop recognised the importance of railways in warfare, and designed the rolling stock to facilitate the movement of troops and equipment. Rolling stock rode on pressed-steel Fox bogies, using the Timmis system of double coiled springs. The line was constructed with rail inclination (then a new idea), which involves tilting the rail a few degrees to make its surface more nearly parallel with that of the rim of the wheels. Inclination is now applied universally to railways. Prior to shipment of the rolling stock to India, Calthrop and the Leeds Forge Company, manufacturer of the rolling stock, conducted tests on a specially built test track located at Newlay, near Leeds. The line was opened for inspection by railway officials and journalists, and a number of reports were published in the technical railway press.

The BLR finally opened in 1897, and was extended on a number of occasions until it reached a total length of 202 mi (325 km) in 1927. It is regarded as having revolutionised the narrow-gauge railway system on the Indian subcontinent; the railway was immensely successful, establishing Calthrop as one of the leading figures in the field. Calthrop remained Consulting Engineer until he retired, due to ill health, two years before his death. The BLR continued to be operated as a privately owned railway until 1954, when it was purchased by the Indian Railways.

== Rolling stock ==
In 1936, the company owned 31 locomotives, 6 steam railcars, 120 coaches and 288 goods wagons.

== BLR System and Extensions ==
Information generally based on "Administration Report on Railways 1918"

- ‘Main Line’

‘Kurduvai To Barsi Town’, 22 miles (35 km), opened 1897

- ‘Barsi Town-Latur Extension'

‘Barsi Town-Kuslamb’, 6 miles (10 km), opened 1905

‘Kuslamb-Tadwala’, 20 miles (32 km), opened 1906

- ‘Kurduvadi-Pandharpur Extension'

‘Kurduvadi to near Pandharpur, 31 miles (50 km), opened 1905

‘Extension to Pandharpur Town, 2 miles (3 km), opened 1906

From Kurduvadi (originally named Barsi Road) to Pandharpur, 20.56 miles, opened 2 Dec 1906, extended further 1.78 miles, 16 July 1915. The variation order had been approved on 20 August 1895 signed by the Principality of Pandharpur stated they were building a bridge over the Bhima river to take the railway into the town the route to follow route 161 a distance 34 miles (54 km) [11]. Pandharpur was a significant pilgrimage town and the line was an extension of the BLR from Kurduvadi (Barsi Road) where there was a connection with the GIPR mainline.

- ‘Tadwale to Latur Extension’

‘Tadwale to Hyderabad Frontier, 1 mile (1.6 km), opened 1911

‘Hyderabad Frontier to Latur, 36 miles (58 km), opened 1911

- ‘Pandharpur-Miraj Extension’

‘Pandharpur to Miraj, 84 miles(135 km), opened 1927 [12].

From Pandharpur via Lonand to Miraj, 'approximate length 77 miles, to connect to the Southern Mahratta Railway(SMR Poona Branch) at Miraj. This line involved bridges over the Bhima river at Pandharpur and the Man, south of Sangola, and was first proposed in 1906 [13]. The finalised route was approved in August 1916 for an extension from Pandaharpur to Lonand and Miraj, a distance of 79 ½ miles (126 km) [14]

- ‘Pandharpur-Bijapur Extension’ (via Athani) - proposed but not constructed

From Pandharpur to Bijapur, ‘a length of about 77 miles, which would form a chord between Poona and Bijapur branches of the South Mahratta Railway’ [13].

The ‘Statistics of Working’ show the year-by-year financial results from 1913-14 through to 1936-37 and the BLR System rising from 116 miles (186 km) reaching 203 miles (326 km) from 1928-29 onwards [12]

== Purchased by the Indian Railways ==
In 1954, it was discussed in Parliament, to wit:

"That, the Bill to impose upon the Barsi Light Railway Company, Limited, an obligation to make certain payments to the Central Government, be taken into consideration."

The Barsi Light Railway Company was the last of the Sterling Companies operating in India and Government decided in December 1952 to exercise the option under the contract to purchase the Railway by giving a year's notice. Accordingly, after the expiration of the notice period the Railway was taken over on the 1st January, 1954 and is now a part of the Central Railway System.

The Company expressed its willingness in November 1953 to accept the liability but pleaded that it was legally incompetent to do so under the English Law applying to the Company which was incorporated in the United Kingdom. According to that Law, the Company was incompetent to make any gratuitous payments from out of the purchase price.

== Technical Innovations ==
The Barsi Light Railway is regarded as having revolutionised the narrow-gauge railway system of the Indian subcontinent. The engineer Everard Richard Calthrop applied a systematic and logical approach to narrow gauge design with an insistence on a rigidly imposed axle weight limit of five tons allowing lightweight construction of track work and engineering features while simultaneously building the rolling stock to the largest possible size to ensure maximum capacity. The introduction of rail inclination (now universal but then a new idea on railways of any gauge) which reduces wear on wheels and rails by tilting the rail a few degrees to make its surface more nearly parallel with that of the tyre [15]. Five 0-8-4T locomotives were constructed to Calthrop's specification by Kitson and Company. The goods rolling stock was constructed on common 25 by 7 ft. (7.62 by 2.13 m) pressed-steel underframes, maximising wagon loads [2].

The specification had 2 ft 6 inches overhang on each side of the track making a total width of 7 feet 6 inches [16].

== Influences ==
Internationally, other narrow-gauge railways copied the Calthrop ideas, such as the Victorian narrow-gauge railways in Australia, which was persuaded to change from 610 mm (2 ft) gauge to 762 mm (2 ft 6 in) gauge so as to use the rolling stock designs already available for this gauge. The four lines in Victoria totalled 190.7 miles in length.

== Conversion to broad gauge ==
The Kurduwadi–Miraj section was converted to broad gauge in 2002. The Latur–Osmanabad section was converted to broad gauge in September 2007. Osmanabad did not lie on the narrow-gauge railway line and the alignment was changed for the new broad-gauge track to pass through Osmanabad. Politics played an Important role in routing the BG Rail Line via Osmanabad. Muslim Majority Osmanabad (Usmanabad) was given Rail connection whereas the BG line was initially planned to go via Dhebarewadi having Naya Ramling Rail Station. Currently National Highway 63(NH63) is running using the earlier planned BG Rail Line alignment after the BG Rail Line was shifted to run via Osmanabad (Osmanabad is renamed Dharashivpur now). Finally the remaining Osmanabad–Kurduwadi section of broad-gauge track became operational in October 2008 after construction of 1,936 metres (6,352 ft) long Jahagirdarwadi Nagbodhi Tunnel completed.
